= List of schools in Rochdale =

== State-funded schools ==
=== Primary schools ===
- Alice Ingham RC Primary School, Rochdale
- Alkrington Primary School, Alkrington
- All Saints CE Primary School, Rochdale
- All Souls CE Primary School, Heywood
- Ashfield Valley Primary School, Rochdale
- Bamford Academy, Rochdale
- Belfield Community School, Belfield
- Boarshaw Community Primary School, Middleton
- Bowlee Park Community Primary School, Langley
- Brimrod Community Primary School, Rochdale
- Broadfield Community Primary School, Rochdale
- Caldershaw Primary School, Rochdale
- Castleton Primary School, Castleton
- Crossgates Primary School, Milnrow
- Deeplish Primary Academy, Rochdale
- Elm Wood Primary School, Middleton
- Greenbank Primary School, Rochdale
- Hamer Community Primary School, Rochdale
- Harwood Park Primary School, Heywood
- Healey Foundation Primary School, Rochdale
- Heap Bridge Village Primary School, Heywood
- Heybrook Primary School, Rochdale
- Hollin Primary School, Middleton
- Holy Family RC Primary School, Rochdale
- Holy Trinity CE Primary School, Littleborough
- Hopwood Community Primary School, Heywood
- Kentmere Primary Academy, Smallbridge
- Little Heaton CE Primary School, Middleton
- Littleborough Community Primary School, Littleborough
- Lowerplace Primary School, Rochdale
- Marland Hill Community Primary School, Rochdale
- Meanwood Community Nursery and Primary School, Rochdale
- Middleton Parish CE Primary School, Middleton
- Milnrow Parish CE Primary School, Milnrow
- Moorhouse Academy, Milnrow
- Newhey Community Primary School, Newhey
- Norden Community Primary School, Norden
- Our Lady and St Paul's RC Primary School, Darnhill
- Parkfield Primary School, Middleton
- Sacred Heart RC Primary School, Rochdale
- St Andrew's CE Primary School and Nursery, Rochdale
- St Edward's CE Primary School, Castleton
- St Gabriel's CE Primary School, Middleton
- St Gabriel's RC Primary School, Castleton
- St James' CE Primary School, Wardle
- St John Fisher RC Primary School, Middleton
- St John's CE Primary School, Thornham
- St John's RC Primary School, Rochdale
- St Joseph's RC Primary School, Heywood
- St Luke's CE Primary School, Heywood
- St Margaret's CE Primary School, Heywood
- St Mary's CE Primary School, Balderstone
- St Mary’s RC Primary School, Langley
- St Mary's RC Primary School, Littleborough
- St Michael's CE Primary School, Alkrington
- St Michael's CE Primary School, Bamford
- St Patrick's RC Primary School, Rochdale
- St Peter's CE Primary School, Rochdale
- St Peter's RC Primary School, Middleton
- St Thomas' CE Primary School, Newhey
- St Thomas More RC Primary School, Alkrington
- St Vincent's RC Primary, Norden
- Sandbrook Community Primary School, Rochdale
- Shawclough Community Primary School, Shawclough
- Smithy Bridge Foundation Primary School, Littleborough
- Spotland Primary School, Rochdale
- Stansfield Hall CE/Free Church Primary School, Littleborough
- Whittaker Moss Primary School, Norden
- Woodland Community Primary School, Heywood

=== Secondary schools ===
- Cardinal Langley RC High School, Middleton
- Edgar Wood Academy, Middleton
- Falinge Park High School, Shawclough
- Hollingworth Academy, Milnrow
- Holy Family RC & CE College, Heywood
- Kingsway Park High School, Rochdale
- Matthew Moss High School, Rochdale
- Middleton Technology School, Middleton
- Newhouse Academy, Heywood
- Oulder Hill Leadership Academy, Rochdale
- St Anne's Academy, Middleton
- St Cuthbert's RC High School, Rochdale
- Wardle Academy, Wardle

=== Special and alternative schools ===
- Brownhill School, Rochdale
- Newlands School, Middleton
- Redwood, Rochdale
- Rochdale Pupil Referral Service, Belfield
- Springside, Rochdale

=== Further education ===
- Hopwood Hall College
- Rochdale Sixth Form College

== Independent schools ==
=== Senior and all-through schools ===
- Beech House School, Rochdale
- Rochdale Islamic Academy, Rochdale
- Rochdale Islamic Academy for Girls, Rochdale

=== Special and alternative schools ===
- Cedar Lodge School, Middleton
- Elizabeth House School, Middleton
- Great Howarth School, Rochdale
- Meadows School, Wardle
- Willow View School, Rochdale
