= Butterworth, Greater Manchester =

Ancient township in England

Coordinates: 53°37′N 2°06′W

Butterworth
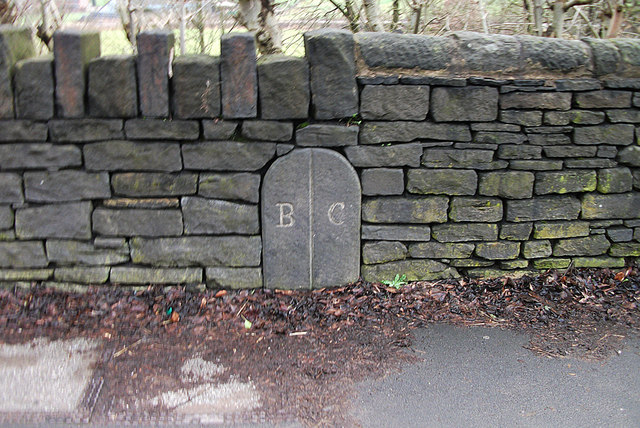
- A boundary stone on the A663 road, marking the ancient border between Butterworth and Crompton

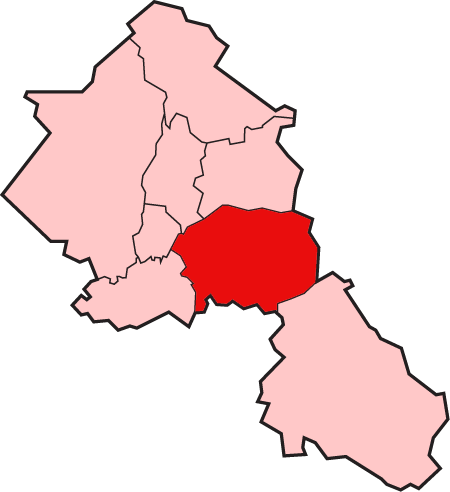
- Butterworth shown within the parish of Rochdale
- Area
  - 1871: 7,766 acres (31.43 km^{2})
  - 1891: 7,766 acres (31.43 km^{2})
- Population
  - 1841: 5,648
  - 1891: 9,438
- History
  - Created: Middle Ages
  - Abolished: 1894
- Status: Township (1148–1894) & Civil Parish (1866–1894)
  - Units: Butterworth Freehold, Butterworth Lordship
Succeeded by
Milnrow Urban District

Butterworth was a township occupying the southeastern part of the parish of Rochdale, in the hundred of Salford, Lancashire, England. It was also a civil parish. It encompassed 12.1 square miles (31 km^{2}) of land in the South Pennines which spanned the settlements of Belfield, Bleaked-gate-cum-Roughbank, Butterworth Hall, Clegg, Haughs, Hollingworth, Kitcliffe, Lowhouse, Milnrow, Newhey, Ogden, Rakewood, Smithy Bridge, Tunshill and Wildhouse. It extended to the borders of Crompton to the south, and to the highest points of Bleakedgate Moor and Clegg Moor, up to the ridge of Blackstone Edge, to the east, where its boundary was the old county boundary between Lancashire and Yorkshire. In 1891 the parish had a population of 9438.

Butterworth was probably settled in Saxon times in the Early Middle Ages. Its land was divided into two divisions, the Lordship side with rents or services payable to the lord of the manor and the Freehold side that retained its importance until 1879 as a Registration district for births, deaths and marriages. In 1830, Butterworth was recorded to have 5,554 inhabitants.

== History ==
=== Origins ===
Butterworth probably originates from an Anglo-Saxon settlement of England in the early Middle Ages. Its name is derived from Old English butere 'butter' and worð 'enclosure'. Butterworth was one of four divisions of the ancient parish of Rochdale in the Salford Hundred. Its recorded history dates from the mid-12th century. The Order of St John of Jerusalem, the Knights Hospitaller, had extensive land holdings, and its practice was to mark the boundaries of their lands and buildings where rents were due with a stone or metal cross. In 1851, an old half-timbered house in the hamlet of Butterworth Hall was destroyed by fire, revealing an iron cross on its gable, indicating that it was owned by the order until the dissolution of the monasteries in 1536–1539 by Henry VIII. A charter of 1244 mentioned land in Butterworth adjoining land belonging to Sir Baldwin Teutonicas (or de Tyas), who was a knight of the order. A charter of about 1280 transferred rents amounting to twopence in silver and four barbed arrows of iron for lands in Butterworth to the Abbot of Stanlow Abbey. The name of the township was used by Reginal(d) de Boterworth, lord of the manor, who was granted land in the township by a charter of 1148. Butterworth Hall was built before 1166. A manuscript from the reign of Edward II recorded the township's name as Buckworth.

=== Governance ===
The Knights of the Order of St John of Jerusalem held a court leet in Butterworth after 1148. In 1253, in the reign of Henry III, permission was granted for the Knights to erect a gallows "on a bleak hill to the north of Milnrow", now commemorated in the name of a public house at the top of Kiln Lane hill. The manorial courts were replaced by the Duchy Court with a Deputy Bailiff in Rochdale, referenced in relation to actions for trespass in 1567 and for breach of contract in 1608. A courthouse for hearings of petty sessions before justices of the peace was built in 1656 on Dale Street, Milnrow. The manorial division of Butterworth continued into the 19th and early 20th centuries. In 1828, the Lordship side and the Freehold side each had an overseer and a constable. Welfare provisions, derived from the Elizabethan Poor Law of 1601, were replaced by Poor Law Amendment Acts of the 19th century.

Industrialisation and population increases in Milnrow and Newhey were made at the expense of Butterworth. In 1866 Butterworth became a separate civil parish, Milnrow Local Board was formed in 1870 and parts of Butterworth including Hollingworth Lake, were transferred to local boards in Littleborough and Wardle. In 1894 Milnrow Local Board was replaced by Milnrow Urban District Council, and the township identity ceased but its name survives in the hamlet Butterworth Hall, its hall, and Butterworth Hall Brook, the parish was abolished and merged with Milnrow, Littleborough, Rochdale and Wardle. The area of the former township lies within the Metropolitan Borough of Rochdale in Greater Manchester.

=== Religion ===
Before the Reformation, Milnrow was the chapelry in the township which was in the ecclesiastical parish of Rochdale and diocese of Lichfield. In 1400 the Bishop of Lichfield granted a licence to Sir John Byron, an ancestor of the 19th-century poet Lord Byron, to celebrate mass in a chantry chapel at Butterworth Hall. In 1496 a chapel was built on the banks of the River Beal in Milnrow. A Parliamentary Inquisition of 1650 concluded that "Butterworth was fit to be made a parish" on account of its population and the income of its chapel. By the 19th century Milnrow had become the dominant settlement in the township and was created a separate parish by the Rochdale Vicarage Act 1866. A parish church dedicated to St James was built in 1868. In 1876-77 the Church of St Thomas was built in Newhey becoming the second parish in the township acknowledging that Newhey had become the second most important settlement.
