= Milnrow Town Hall =

Municipal building in Milnrow, Greater Manchester, England

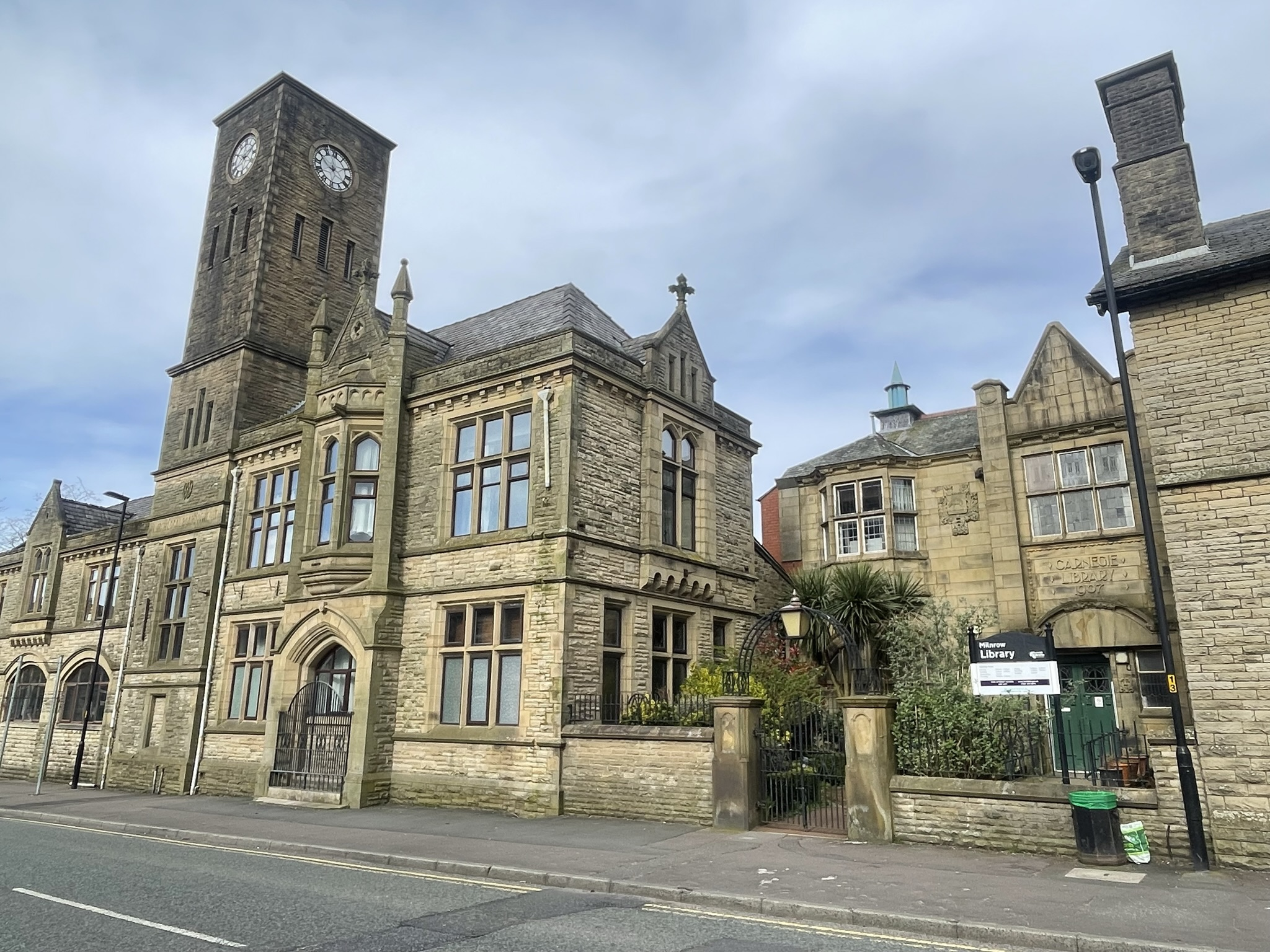
- The town hall and library in 2024

- Shown in Greater Manchester
- 53.6061°N 2.1049°W
- Location: Newhey Road, Milnrow

History
- Built: 1889

Site notes
- Architectural style: Gothic Revival style

Milnrow Town Hall, formerly known as Milnrow Council Offices (and originally the Local Board Offices), is a former municipal building in Newhey Road, Milnrow, a town in Greater Manchester in England. Built together with an attached fire station, it opened in 1889 and forms a group with the neighbouring former police station (1886) and Milnrow's Carnegie Library (1907). The building, which for decades served as the offices and meeting place of Milnrow Urban District Council, is currently vacant.

== History ==
Following significant population growth, largely associated with the number of cotton mills in the area, a local board of health was established in Milnrow in 1870. The local board decided to commission dedicated offices in which to hold its meetings. The site they selected was open land on the northeast side of Newhey Road. The Milnrow School, established in 1726 (where 'Tim Bobbin' famously taught), formerly stood on the site.

Construction work on the offices started in 1885. The building was designed in the Gothic Revival style, built in sandstone and was completed in 1889. The design had an asymmetrical main frontage facing onto Newhey Road, with a central clock tower flanked by the fire station to the left and the town hall to the right. The single-bay clock tower featured a small window on the ground floor with an architrave above, a large mullioned and transomed window on the first floor, surmounted by an entablature inscribed with the words "Milnrow Local Board of Health", a date stone with the date "1889" and a gable above. There was originally a wooden clock turret, with a belfry, a spire and a weather vane, behind the gable; the hour-striking clock was by J. B. Joyce & Co. The town hall to the right was of three bays: in the centre was an arched entrance (with an archivolt, a hood mould and a keystone) on the ground floor, and an oriel window flanked by pinnacles on the first floor, all surmounted by a gable, while the other two bays were fenestrated by mullioned and transomed windows on both floors; the roof was topped with a flèche. The fire station to the left was also of three bays with a central gable, but lower in height and with less ornamentation than the town hall.

In 1894, the board was succeeded by Milnrow Urban District Council, which maintained its headquarters in the building which became known as the town hall. A Carnegie library was added, set back between the town hall and the police station, to a design by Butterworth and Duncan, in 1908. The library included a lecture room on the first floor, which doubled as the council chamber. The original clock turret was dismantled and replaced by a taller stone tower of much plainer design, probably in the late 1930s.

The building continued to serve as the meeting place of the district council for much of the 20th century, but ceased to be the local seat of government when the enlarged Rochdale Borough Council was formed in 1974. The building briefly served as the health department of the new council. However, in 1979, the health department moved to new offices in central Rochdale.

In 2002, the building was sold to Milnrow Properties Limited, who were granted planning permission 'to convert the building into four new apartments while retaining its character'. In 2005, plans were put forward to demolish the building and construct two apartment blocks, but these proposals were abandoned in the face of local opposition. Subsequently they allowed the building to fall into a state of disrepair.

The adjacent library was grade II listed in 2012. A lobby organisation entitled "The Friends of Milnrow Clock Tower and Library Group" was launched in 2014, with the aim of restoring public access to the former council chamber, and returning the town hall clock tower to working order.
