= Milnrow Urban District =

Former local government area in the UK

Coordinates: 53°37′N 2°07′W

- Area
  - 1911: 5,194 acres (21.02 km^{2})
  - 1961: 5,195 acres (21.02 km^{2})
- Population
  - 1911: 8,584
  - 1971: 10,345
- History
  - Created: 1894
  - Abolished: 1974
  - Succeeded by: Metropolitan Borough of Rochdale
- Status: Urban district
  - HQ: Milnrow Town Hall
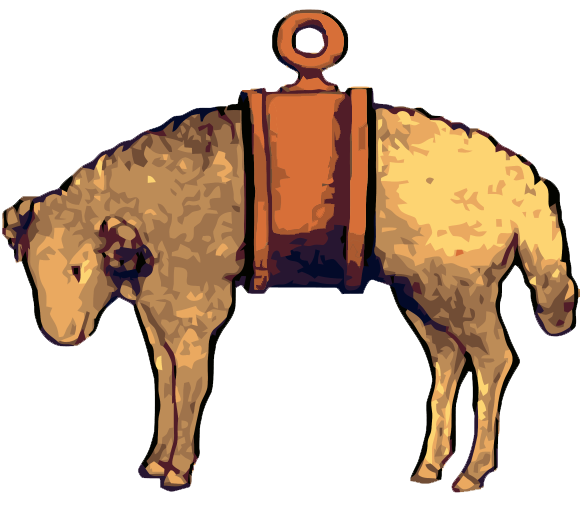

Milnrow Urban District was, from 1894 to 1974, a local government district of the administrative county of Lancashire, in northwest England. It covered an area to the east and southeast of the County Borough of Rochdale, and included the town of Milnrow, the village of New Hey, and the Piethorne Valley; Crompton Urban District lay to the south.

Milnrow Urban District was created by the Local Government Act 1894, and was for the most part the successor to the township of Butterworth. In 1974, Milnrow Urban District was abolished by the Local Government Act 1972 and its former area transferred to Greater Manchester to form part of the Metropolitan Borough of Rochdale.
