= Belfield, Greater Manchester =

Locality within Rochdale, in Greater Manchester, England

Coordinates: 53.61819°N 2.127756°W

Belfield
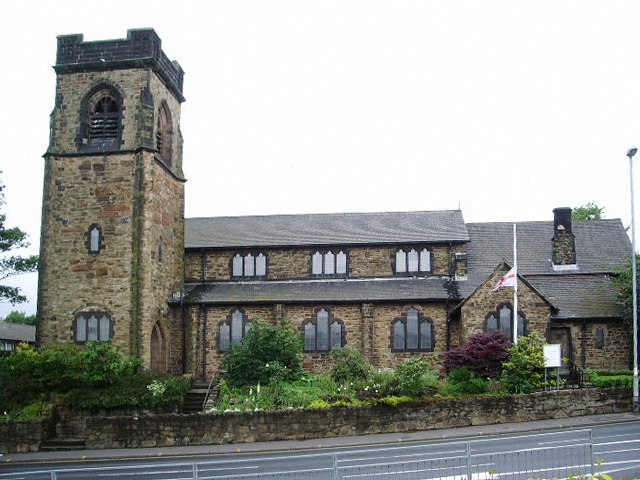
- St Ann's church, Belfield

- Location within Greater Manchester
- OS grid reference: SD915135
  - London: 169 mi (272 km) SSE
- Metropolitan borough: Rochdale
- Metropolitan county: Greater Manchester
- Region: North West
- Country: England
- Sovereign state: United Kingdom
- Post town: ROCHDALE
- Postcode district: OL16
- Dialling code: 01706
- Police: Greater Manchester
- Fire: Greater Manchester
- Ambulance: North West

Belfield is an area within Rochdale, in Greater Manchester, England. It lies at the confluence of the River Beal and River Roch, 1.3 miles (2.1 km) east-northeast of Rochdale's town centre. Belfield is bound to the east by the Rochdale Canal, which forms Rochdale's common boundary with Firgrove in Milnrow.

Historically a part of Lancashire, Belfield was formerly a hamlet within the ancient township of Butterworth, and for a time held in part by the Knights Hospitaller. Belfield derives its name from the River Beal, which flows into the area from neighbouring Milnrow.

A family with the surname Belfield were living in the locality during the reign of Edward III, when lands in Butterworth were conveyed to Adam de Belfield (1278–1279). In 1293–1294 Richard de Belfield conveyed to his brother Henry, "all his lands lying between the Bele (River Beal) and Stonneybeck (Stanney Brook)".

For centuries a major landmark in the area was Belfield Hall, a historic house held by local dignitaries, including Alexander Butterworth and Richard Townley, who each served as the High Sheriff of Lancashire.

There is a possible moated site in Belfield (grid reference SD91391362). The building on the site probably dates to c.1619 with parts rebuilt in 1752; part of the building is used as two cottages whilst the rest has been left to decay.

Belfield's Anglican parish church is St Ann's. It was consecrated by the Bishop of Manchester in 1913.

Belfield Bridge lies over the Rochdale Canal and is a Grade II listed structure.

Belfield Community School, a primary school, lies within the locality.
