= Cec Abrahams =

South African cricketer (1932–2007)

Cecil Abrahams
Personal information
- Full name: Cecil John Abrahams
- Born: 8 March 1932; Cape Town
- Died: 15 August 2007 (aged 75); Milnrow, Greater Manchester, England
- Batting: Right-handed
- Bowling: Right-arm medium-fast
- Relatives: John Abrahams (son)

Career statistics
Competition	First-class
Matches	5
Runs scored	111
Batting average	15.85
100s/50s	0/0
Top score	40
Balls bowled	630
Wickets	8
Bowling average	23.50
5 wickets in innings	0
10 wickets in match	0
Best bowling	3/18
Catches/stumpings	4/–
- Source: CricketArchive, 25 June 2016

Cecil John Abrahams (8 March 1932 – 15 August 2007) was a South African cricketer who played for Western Province in first-class cricket briefly in 1974–75, during a coaching tour, following an invitation from the Western Province Cricket Board. His father was Isaac John Abrahams, in his time dubbed the Prince of Batsmen, and his mother was Lillian May (née Schroeder) Abrahams.

He joined the Lancashire League in 1960. He was trained as a dental technician, but the apartheid regime required dental technicians, as people of colour, to work for a white dentist. He resisted this and opened his private dental lab in Kent Road in Salt River, operating under the radar. In 1960, he was invited to England following the offer of a contract with Milnrow, arranged by Basil D'Oliviera. In Mogamad Allie's cricket history book, More than a game, Allie wrote, "... Abrahams displayed a massive appetite for the game in his new environment, playing for 15 seasons in the Central Lancashire League - first for Milnrow, and later for Radcliffe and Oldham. And although the highpoints were too many to count, his best season was in 1970, when he took 89 wickets at 10,25 runs per wicket - the best bowling effort in the league that year by a professional". His family joined him in England in 1962: his wife Cynthia, and children John, Jean, Basil, Peter, Noreen, and Lynn. Carole, the youngest, would be born in England. His eldest son, John Abrahams, captained the Lancashire county cricket team. His two sons, Peter and Basil, regularly played cricket at weekends. He encouraged some other Western Province Cricket Board players to join the Lancashire League.
