= John Abrahams =

English cricketer

Personal information
- Born: 21 July 1952 (age 74); Salt River, Cape Province, Union of South Africa
- Batting: Left-handed
- Bowling: Right arm off break

Career statistics
Competition	First-class	List A
Matches	252	215
Runs scored	10,059	3,759
Batting average	29.76	25.06
100s/50s	14/53	1/19
Top score	201*	103*
Balls bowled	5,695	1,184
Wickets	56	23
Bowling average	50.19	39.52
5 wickets in innings	0	0
10 wickets in match	0	0
Best bowling	3/27	2/11
Catches/stumpings	162/–	70/–
- Source: CricketArchive, 6 November 2021

John Abrahams (born 21 July 1952) is an English retired cricket player. His brothers Basil Abrahams and Peter Abrahams, and his late father Cec Abrahams, were also cricketers. During his playing career, Abrahams was known as a left-handed batsman and right arm off break bowler.

He was educated at Heywood Grammar School. He played for Lancashire County Cricket Club from 1973 to 1988, and also appeared for the Minor Counties in 1974 and Shropshire from 1989 to 1991. He was awarded his Lancashire cap in 1982, and captained Lancashire in 1984 and 1985. He won the man of the match award in the Benson and Hedges Cup final at Lord's in 1984 for his captaincy, despite not bowling and scoring a duck. He was awarded a benefit season in 1988, which raised £52,500.

He scored 14 first-class hundreds, with a best of 201 not out against Warwickshire. His solitary one day century, 103*, came against Somerset.

Abrahams managed the England Under-19 team during 2009 and coached the side in 2010. His wife Debbie is a Labour MP, elected at the January 2011 parliamentary by-election in Oldham East and Saddleworth. They have two daughters.
