= Tunshill =

Coordinates: 53.615°N 2.085°W

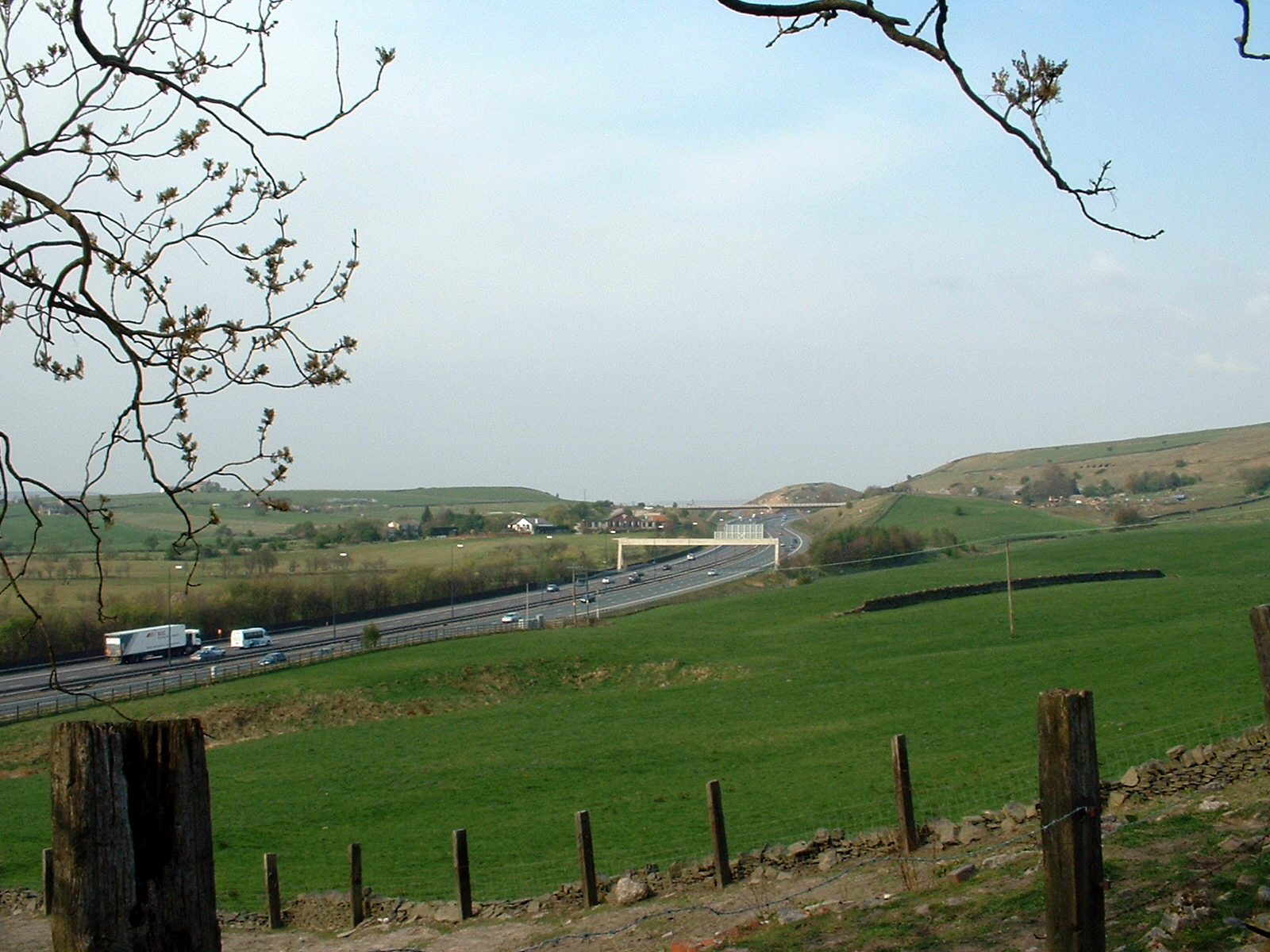
- The M62 motorway bisects Tunshill

- Location within Greater Manchester
- OS grid reference: SD943132
  - London: 168 mi (270 km) SSE
- Metropolitan borough: Rochdale
- Metropolitan county: Greater Manchester
- Region: North West
- Country: England
- Sovereign state: United Kingdom
- Post town: ROCHDALE
- Postcode district: OL16
- Dialling code: 01706
- Police: Greater Manchester
- Fire: Greater Manchester
- Ambulance: North West
- UK Parliament: Oldham East and Saddleworth

Tunshill is a hamlet at the northeastern edge of Milnrow, within the Metropolitan Borough of Rochdale, in Greater Manchester, England. It lies amongst the foothills of the Pennines, 3.0 miles (4.8 km) east of Rochdale and 5.1 miles (8.2 km) north-northeast of Oldham.

It includes a golf club and numerous farms.

A small Roman statue of the goddess Victory was discovered at Tunshill Farm in 1793.

In the 1970s, the M62 motorway was built through the area.
