= Merriam-Webster's Geographical Dictionary =

Geographical dictionary by Merriam-Webster

Merriam-Webster's Geographical Dictionary, Third Edition is a gazetteer by the publisher Merriam-Webster published in 1998. The original edition was published in 1949 as Webster's Geographical Dictionary. The second edition in 1972 was called Webster's New Geographical Dictionary. The completely new third edition features 252 maps produced by the Encyclopædia Britannica cartography department.

The latest edition was released in 1997, revised by Donald J. Zeigler, Ph.D Professor of Geography at Old Dominion University, contained over 54,000 entries. The dictionary has currently over 54,000 alphabetically arranged entries of mountains, lakes, towns, and countries. It includes almost all places in the United States with a population greater than 2,500. The threshold for inclusion of places outside the U.S. varies (from those over 4500 in Canada to those over 100,000 in Bangladesh and China). Included are 250 maps in black and white.

== Editions ==
- Webster's Geographical Dictionary: A Dictionary of Names of Places, With Geographical and Historical Information and Pronunciations. 1949. Springfield, MA: G. & C. Merriam Co. 1293 pages, 40,000 entries, 24 colored and 153 b/w maps.
- Webster's New Geographical Dictionary. 1972. (ISBN 0877791465) Springfield, MA: G. & C. Merriam Co. 47,000 entries, 218 maps.
- Merriam-Webster's Geographical Dictionary, 3rd ed. 1997. (ISBN 0-87779-546-0) Springfield, MA: Merriam-Webster Inc. 1,361 pages, 48,000 entries.
- Merriam-Webster's Geographical Dictionary, 3rd rev. ed. 2001. (ISBN 0-87779-546-0) Springfield, MA: Merriam-Webster Inc. 1,392 pages, 54,000 entries, 252 maps.

== Similar works ==
- Columbia-Lippincott Gazetteer of the World. Cohen, Saul B. (ed.). 1998. (ISBN 0-231-11040-5) Columbia University Press. 3578 pages, 165,000 entries
- Lippincott's New Gazetteer: A Complete Gazetteer or Geographical Dictionary of the World. 1905. Heilprin, A. and L. (eds.). Philadelphia: J.B. Lippincott Co.
- Longmans' Gazetteer of the World. Chisholm, George C. (ed.). 1895. London and New York: Longmans, Green and Co., about 74,000 names.
