= John Collier (caricaturist) =

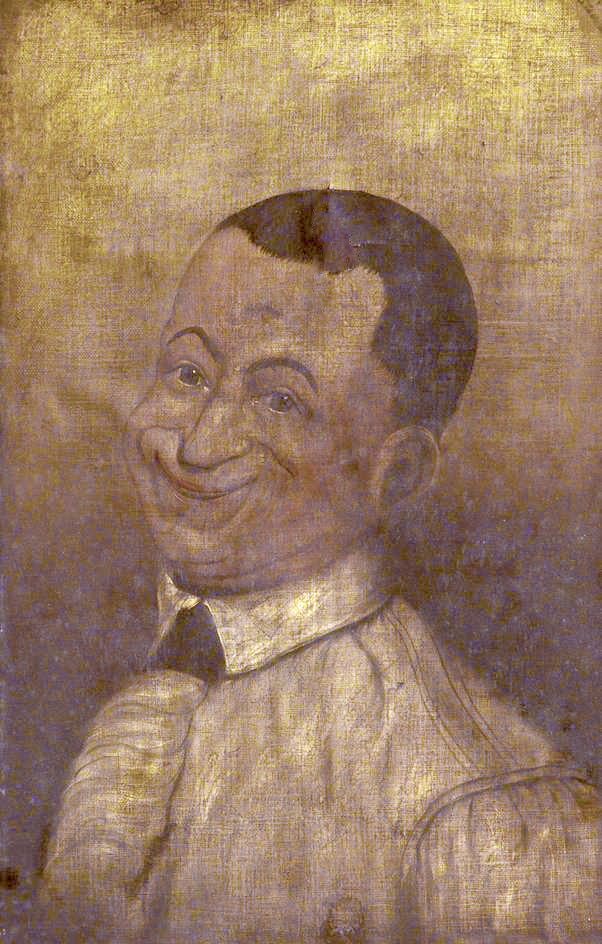
- Self portrait
- Born: 18 December 1708; Urmston, Lancashire, England
- Died: July 14, 1786 (aged 77)
- Style: Caricaturist

John Collier (18 December 1708 – 14 July 1786) was an English caricaturist and satirical poet known by the pseudonym of Tim Bobbin, or Timothy Bobbin. Collier styled himself as the Lancashire Hogarth.

== Life and career ==
Born in Urmston, Lancashire, the son of an impoverished curate, he moved to Milnrow at the age of 17 to work as a schoolmaster. Marriage and nine children meant he needed to supplement his income and he began producing illustrated satirical poetry in Lancashire dialect and a book of dialect terms. His first and most famous work, A View of the Lancashire Dialect, or, Tummus and Mary, appeared in 1746, and is the earliest significant piece of Lancashire dialect to be published. He regularly travelled to Rochdale to sell his work in the local pubs where most of the business of Rochdale was conducted as there was no cloth hall at that time. People in the pubs would ask him to draw portraits of them and their friends and he would charge on the basis of the number of heads in the picture. The Lancashire dialect poetry collection, Human Passions Delineated, a work which he both wrote and illustrated, appeared in 1773. In it he savagely lampooned the behaviour of upper and lower classes alike. The etchings were widely reproduced, and some were printed on ceramics of the time, and a colourised reproduction of 25 of the plates was published in 1810. He died in 1786 leaving the sum of £50 and was buried in the churchyard of Rochdale Parish Church, St. Chad's. He wrote his own epitaph 20 minutes before he died, "Jack of all trades...left to lie i'th dark" which is inscribed upon his gravestone. He had also written a number of other humorous epitaphs for graves, a number of which can still be seen in St. Chad's churchyard.

In 1792 Sir Walter Scott visited the grave and suggested that a public subscription be raised to refurbish it. One thousand people donated a £1-0s–0d each, the tombstone was raised and a fence erected around the grave. A ceremony was arranged, which was attended by many eminent people including a number of Lancashire dialect poets who acknowledged their debt to the first of their number, Tim Bobbin.

== Works ==
- A View of the Lancashire Dialect, or, Tummus and Mary – 1746
- Remarks on the reign of George II – 1760
- Human Passions Delineated in above 120 Figures, Droll, Satyrical and Humorous – 1773
- The Lancashire Dialect; or the Whimsical Adventures and Misfortunes of a Lancashire Clown – 1775

== See also ==
- Edwin Waugh
- Benjamin Brierley
