= Hollingworth Academy =

Location
- Cornfield Street; Milnrow; Greater Manchester, OL16 3DR; England
- Coordinates: 53.60908°N 2.102915°W

Information
- Type: Academy
- Local authority: Rochdale Council
- Department for Education URN: 140091 Tables
- Ofsted: Reports
- Headteacher: Robert McGinty
- Gender: Coeducational
- Age: 11 to 16
- Website: http://www.hollingworthacademy.co.uk/

Hollingworth Academy is a coeducational secondary school with academy status located in Milnrow in the English county of Greater Manchester.

First known as Roch Valley High School, then after amalgamating with Littleborough High School in 1990, it became Hollingworth High School, it was awarded specialist status as a Business and Enterprise College and was renamed Hollingworth Business and Enterprise College. The school moved into a new building in September 2011, and in September 2013 the school converted to academy status and was renamed Hollingworth Academy.

Hollingworth Academy offers GCSEs, BTECs and Cambridge Nationals as programmes of study for pupils.
