= Metropolitan Borough of Rochdale =

Borough of Greater Manchester, England

- Metropolitan borough
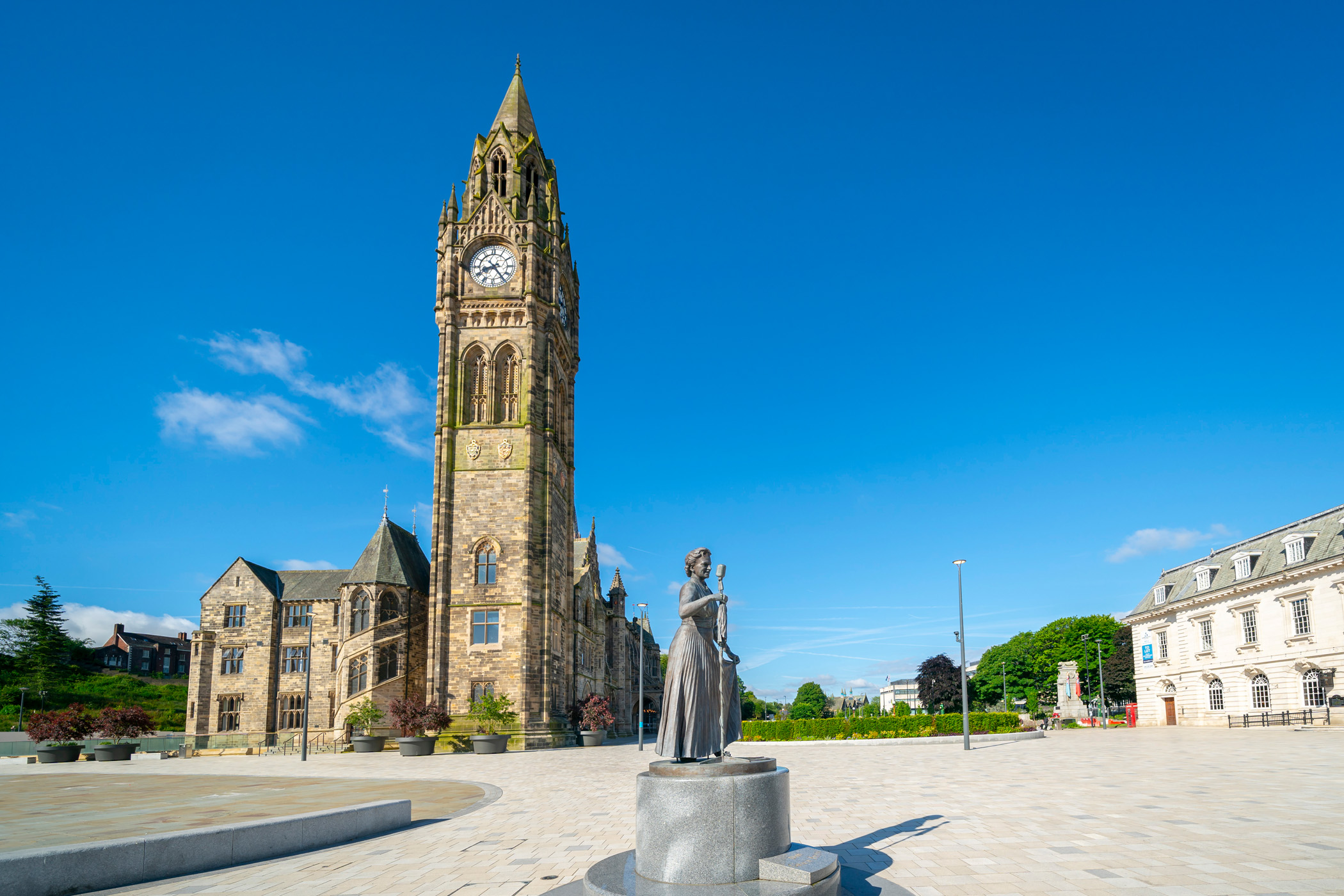
- Rochdale Town Hall

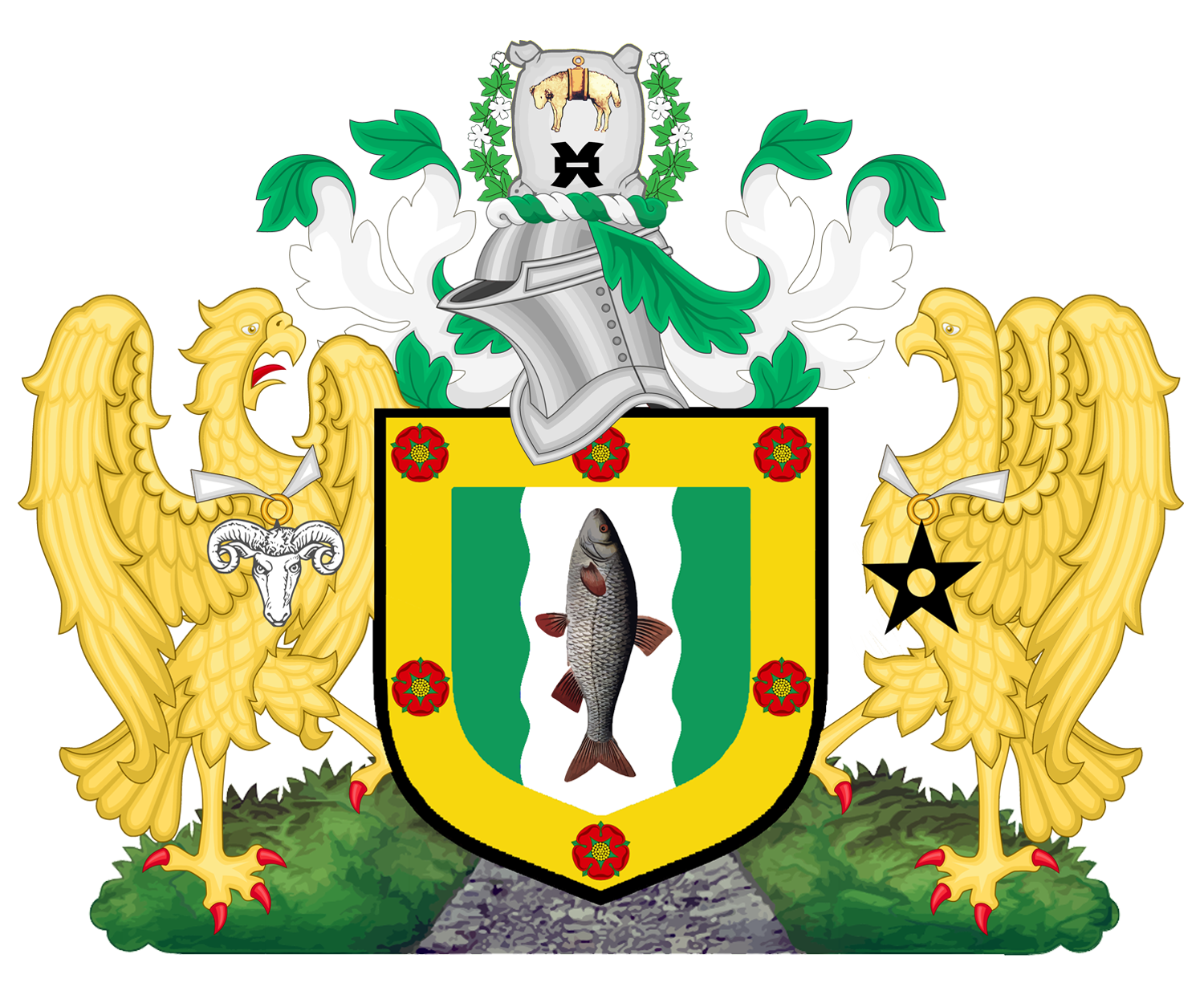
- Coat of arms

- Rochdale shown within Greater Manchester
- Coordinates: 53°37′00″N 2°09′24″W
- Sovereign state: United Kingdom
- Country: England
- Region: North West
- Ceremonial county and city region: Greater Manchester
- Incorporated: 1 April 1974
- Named for: Rochdale
- Administrative HQ: Number One Riverside

Government
  - Type: Metropolitan borough
  - Body: Rochdale Borough Council
  - Executive: Leader and cabinet
  - Control: Labour
  - Leader: Neil Emmott (L)
  - Mayor: Faisal Rana
  - MPs: 2 MPs: Elsie Blundell (L); Paul Waugh (L); Graham Stringer (L)

Area
  - Total: 158 km^{2} (61 sq mi)
  - Rank: 163rd

Population (2025)
  - Total: 237,641
  - Rank: 82nd
  - Density: 1,503/km^{2} (3,890/sq mi)
- Demonym: Rochdalian

Ethnicity (2021)
  - Ethnic groups: List: 74.0% White; 18.5% Asian; 3.5% Black; 2.4% Mixed; 1.6% other

Religion (2021)
  - Religion: List: 46.9% Christianity; 28.8% no religion; 18.8% Islam; 0.3% Hinduism; 0.2% Buddhism; 0.1% Judaism; 0.1% Sikhism; 0.3% other; 4.6% not stated
- Time zone: UTC+0 (GMT)
  - Summer (DST): UTC+1 (BST)
- Postcode area: M; OL
- Dialling code: 0161; 01706
- ISO 3166 code: GB-RCH
- GSS code: E08000005
- Website: rochdale.gov.uk

The Metropolitan Borough of Rochdale is a metropolitan borough of Greater Manchester in England. Its largest town is Rochdale and the wider borough covers other outlying towns and villages, including Heywood, Littleborough, Middleton & Milnrow. It is the ninth-largest district by population in Greater Manchester with a population of 237,641 in 2025.

== History ==
Within the boundaries of the historic county of Lancashire, the borough was formed in 1974 as part of the provisions of the Local Government Act 1972 and is an amalgamation of six former local government districts.

It was originally proposed that the borough include the neighbouring town of Bury and disclude Middleton; Bury however went on to form the administrative centre for the adjacent Metropolitan Borough of Bury. The borough was formed by a merger of the former county borough of Rochdale and from the administrative county of Lancashire, the municipal boroughs of Heywood and Middleton, along with the urban districts of Littleborough, Milnrow and Wardle.

The borough lies mostly within the historic county of Lancashire but a small part lies in the former West Riding of Yorkshire. Prior to its creation, it was suggested that the metropolitan borough be named Chadwick (with reference to Sir Edwin Chadwick), but this was rejected in favour of Rochdale.

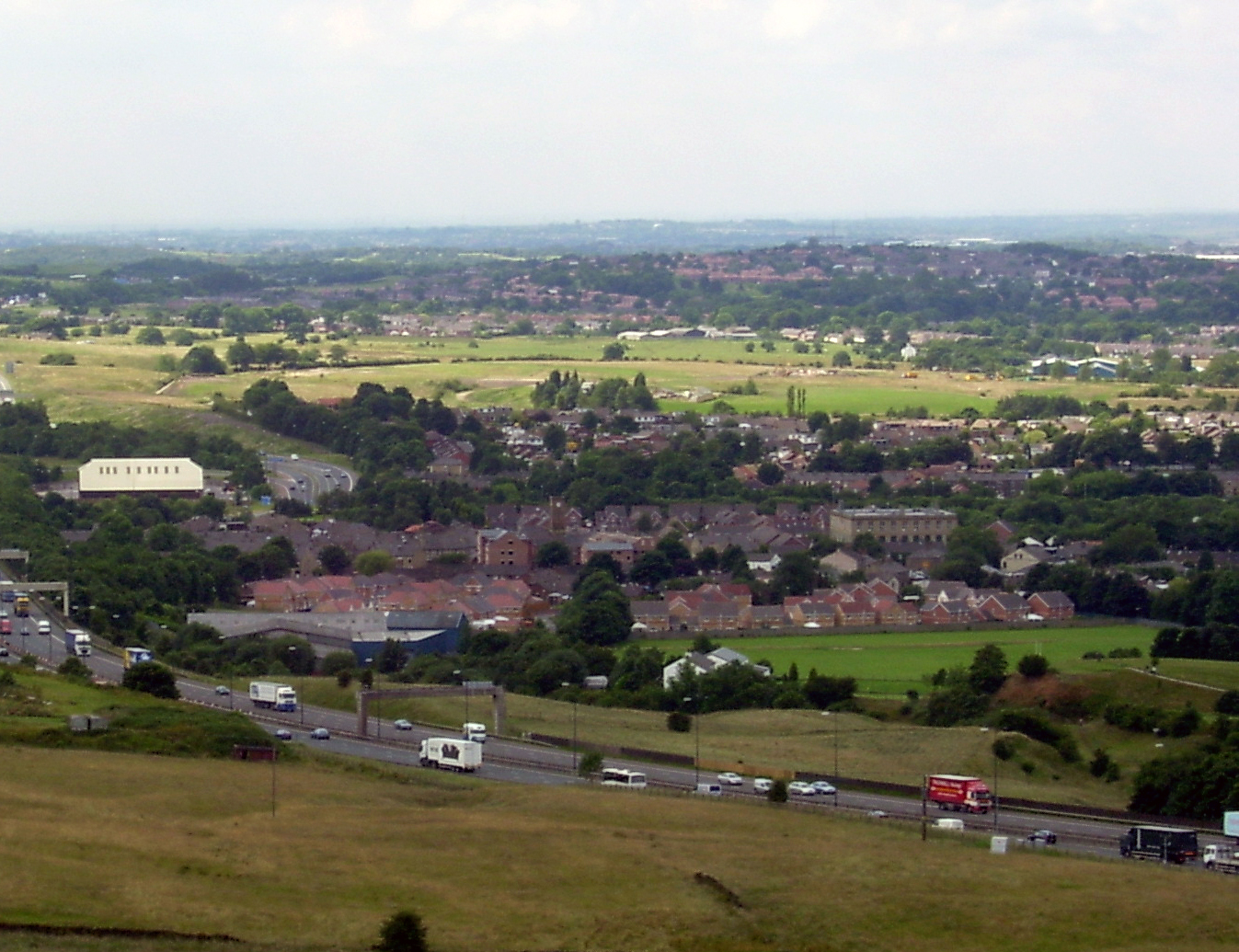
Milnrow skyline

== Premises ==
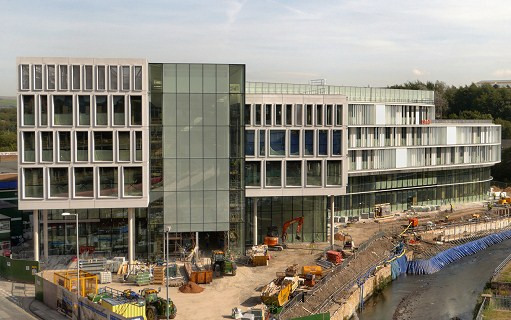
Number One Riverside, the headquarters of Rochdale Borough Council

The council is based at Number One Riverside in Rochdale town centre, which was opened in 2014. It serves as a public library, includes a café, private meeting areas, a conference centre and a workplace. It merged 33 buildings into one and won the award for the best workplace of 2014.

=== Electoral arrangements ===
The borough of Rochdale is divided into 20 wards, each ward having three councillors for a total of 60 councillors. Councillors serve four-year terms, with one-third of the council elected every year except every fourth year when no councilors are elected.

=== Current political make-up ===
The council has been controlled by Labour since 2011.

Party Affiliation	councillors
Labour	31
Conservative	7
Liberal Democrats	3
Workers Party of Britain	4
Reform UK	15

== Geography ==
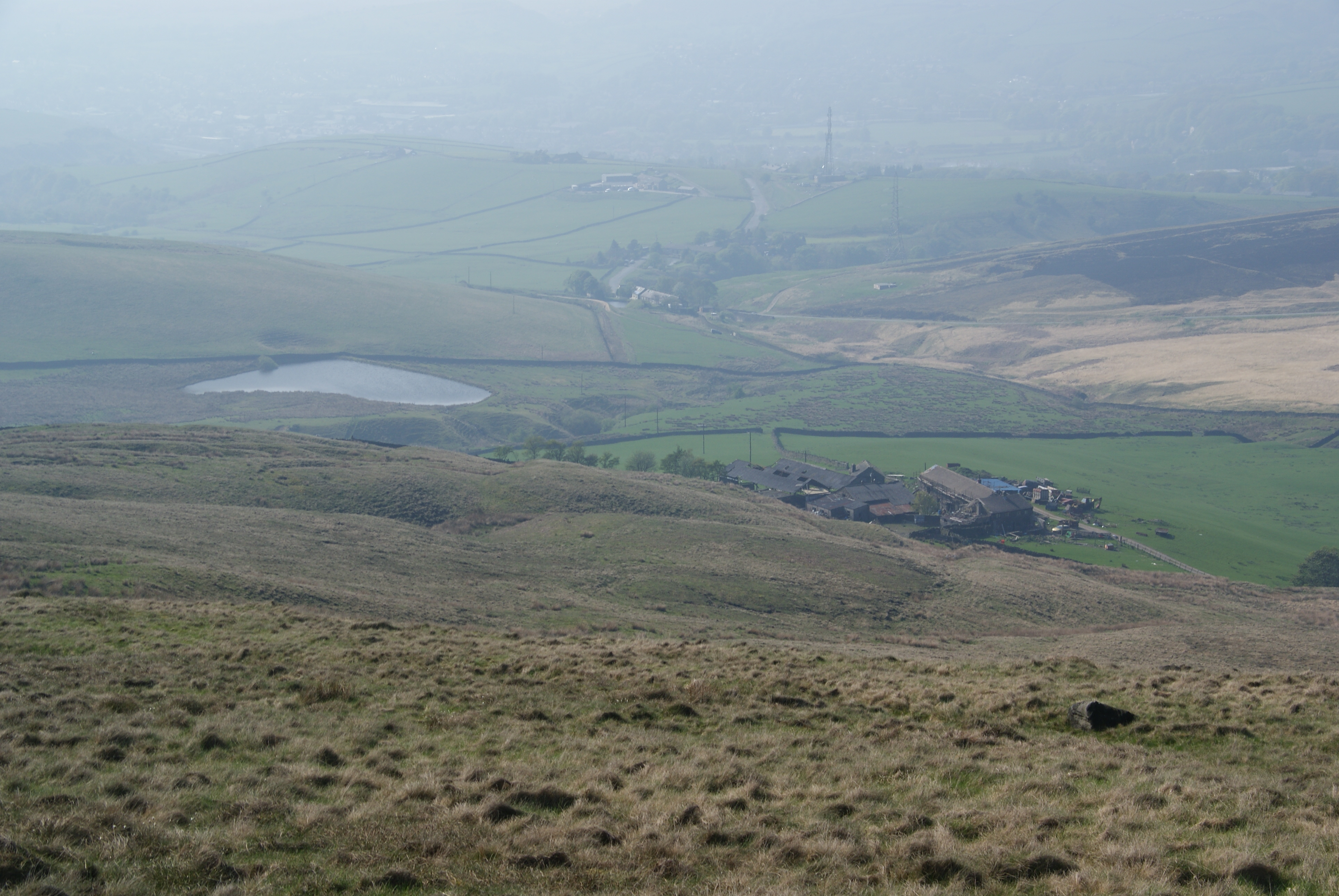
Blackstone Edge Fold, Rochdale

The borough lies directly north-northeast of the City of Manchester, to the east of the Metropolitan Borough of Bury, to the north of the Metropolitan Borough of Oldham and partly to the east of the county of West Yorkshire bordering near to the Metropolitan Borough of Calderdale and the Lancashire borough of Rossendale is to the northwest. There are some rural parts and urban parts of the district including Blackstone Edge and the Pennine hills which form part of the rural areas of the borough. The more urban areas centre around the town and neighbouring boroughs of Bury, Oldham and Manchester. The town of Middleton is contiguous with the northeastern suburbs of Manchester and the towns of Chadderton, Failsworth and Oldham. The towns of Heywood, Littleborough and Milnrow form an urban area with Rochdale.

== Demography ==
=== Ethnicity ===
Ethnic Group	Year												
Ethnic Group	1965 estimates	1971 estimates		1981 estimations		1991 census		2001 census		2011 census		2021 census	
Ethnic Group	Number	Number	%	Number	%	Number	%	Number	%	Number	%	Number	%
White: Total	–	–	97.6%	196,512	94.8%	188,428	92%	181,891	88.6%	172,874	81.6%	165,485	74.0%
White: British	–	–	–	–	–	–	–	176,800	86.1%	166,481	78.6%	156,669	70.0%
White: Irish	–	–	–	–	–	–	–	2,994	1.5%	2,131	1.0%	1,735	0.8%
White: Roma	–	–	–	–	–	–	–	–	–	–	–	163	
White: Gypsy or Irish Traveller	–	–	–	–	–	–	–	–	–	186	0.1%	194	
White: Other	–	–	–	–	–	–	–	2,097	1.0%	4,076	1.9%	6,724	3.0%
Asian or Asian British: Total	–	–	–	9,534	4.6%	14,806	7.2%	20,619	10.2%	31,630	14.9%	41,406	18.4%
Asian or Asian British: Indian	–	–	–	556		821		743	0.4%	1,105	0.5%	1,190	0.5%
Asian or Asian British: Pakistani	2,500	–	–	7,505	3.6%	11,402	5.6%	15,829	7.7%	22,265	10.5%	30,525	13.6%
Asian or Asian British: Bangladeshi	–	–	–	863		1,693		2,594	1.3%	4,342	2.1%	5,170	2.3%
Asian or Asian British: Chinese	–	–	–	285		404		497	0.2%	948	0.4%	867	0.4%
Asian or Asian British: Other Asian	–	–	–	325		486		956	0.5%	2,970	1.4%	3,654	1.6%
Black or Black British: Total	–	–	–	700	0.3%	951	0.5%	651	0.2%	2,770	1.3%	7,927	3.5%
Black or Black British: African	–	–	–	111		145		302	0.1%	2,131	1.0%	6,476	
Black or Black British: Caribbean	–	–	–	281		374		278	0.1%	285	0.1%	440	
Other Black	–	–	–	308		432		71	0.0%	354	0.2%	1,011	
Mixed or British Mixed: Total	–	–	–	–	–	–	–	1,906	0.9%	3,569	1.7%	5,284	2.4%
Mixed: White and Black Caribbean	–	–	–	–	–	–	–	615	0.3%	1,057	0.5%	1,303	
Mixed: White and Black African	–	–	–	–	–	–	–	236	0.1%	601	0.3%	1,210	
Mixed: White and Asian	–	–	–	–	–	–	–	769	0.4%	1,348	0.6%	1,736	
Mixed: Other Mixed	–	–	–	–	–	–	–	286	0.1%	563	0.3%	1,035	
Other: Total	–	–	–	437	0.2%	613	0.3%	290	0.1%	856	0.4%	3,669	1.6%
Other: Arab	–	–	–	–	–	–	–	–	–	308	0.1%	815	
Other: Any other ethnic group	–	–	–	–	–	–	–	290	0.1	548	0.3%	2,854	
Ethnic minority: Total	–	5,011	2.4%	10,671	5.2%	16,370	8%	23,466	11.4%	38,825	18.4%	58,286	26%
Total	–	204,839	100%	207,183	100%	204,798	100%	205,357	100%	211,699	100%	223,773	100%

=== Religion ===
The following table shows the religious identity of residents residing in Rochdale.

Religion	2021	
Religion	Number	%
Christian	104,841	46.9
Muslim	42,121	18.8
Jewish	218	0.1
Hindu	613	0.3
Sikh	191	0.1
Buddhism	398	0.2
Other religion	675	0.3
No religion	64,349	28.8
Religion not stated	10,366	4.6
Total	295,963	100.0

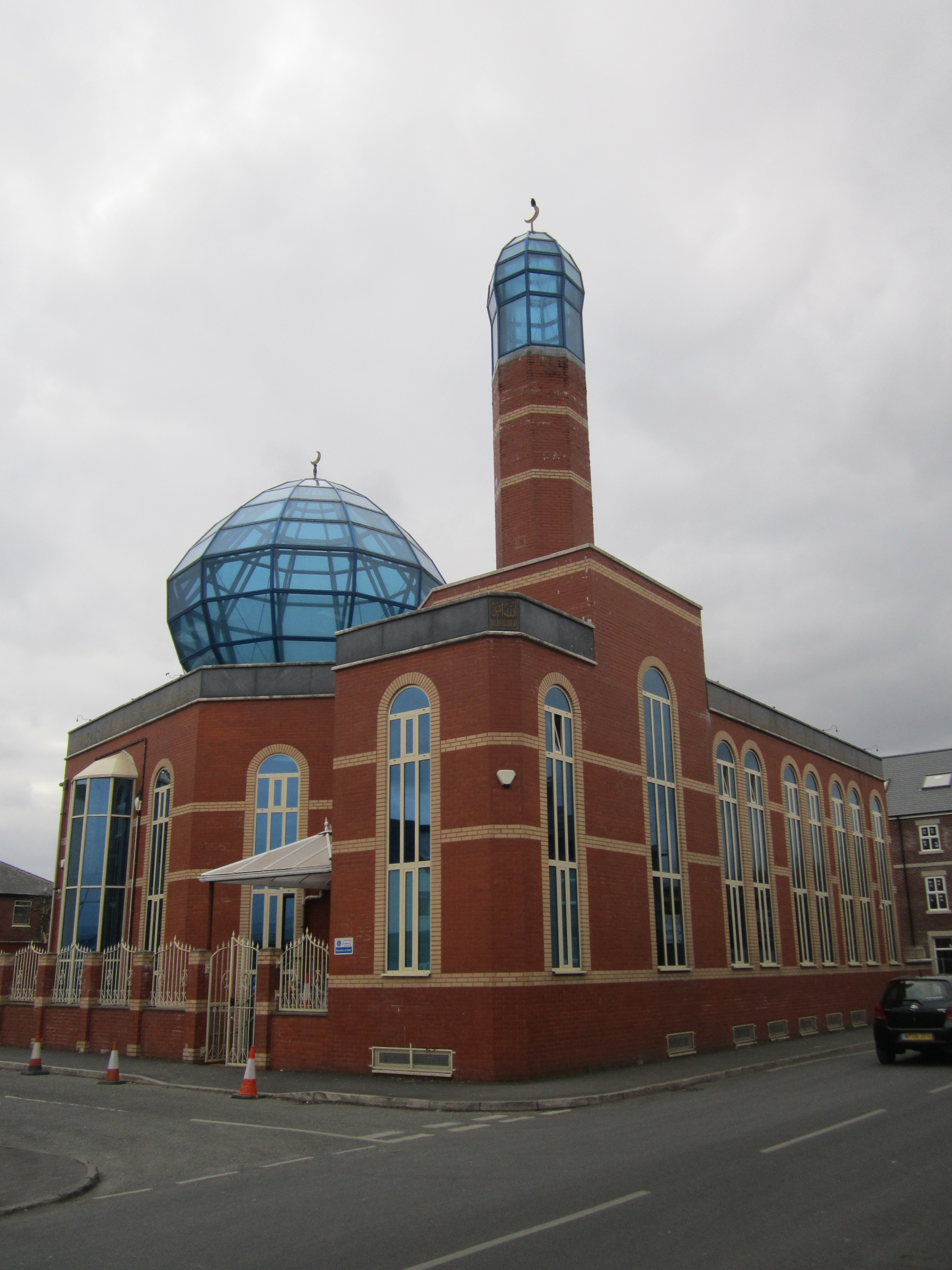
Milkstone Mosque, Rochdale

=== Population change ===
The table below details the population change since 1801, including the percentage change since the last available census data. Although the Metropolitan Borough of Rochdale has only existed 1974, figures have been generated by combining data from the towns, villages, and civil parishes that would later be constituent parts of the borough.

Population growth in Rochdale since 1801
Year	1801	1811	1821	1831	1841	1851	1861	1871	1881	1891	1901	1911	1921	1931	1941	1951	1961	1971	1981	1991	2001
Population	28,689	36,815	46,440	57,377	69,956	80,317	102,247	124,177	146,107	151,490	165,617	181,061	181,227	181,395	177,574	173,833	188,316	204,071	206,351	204,802	205,233
% change	–	+28.3	+26.1	+23.6	+21.9	+14.8	+27.3	+21.4	+17.7	+3.7	+9.3	+9.3	+0.1	+0.1	−2.1	−2.1	+8.3	+8.4	+1.1	−0.8	+0.2
Source: Vision of Britain

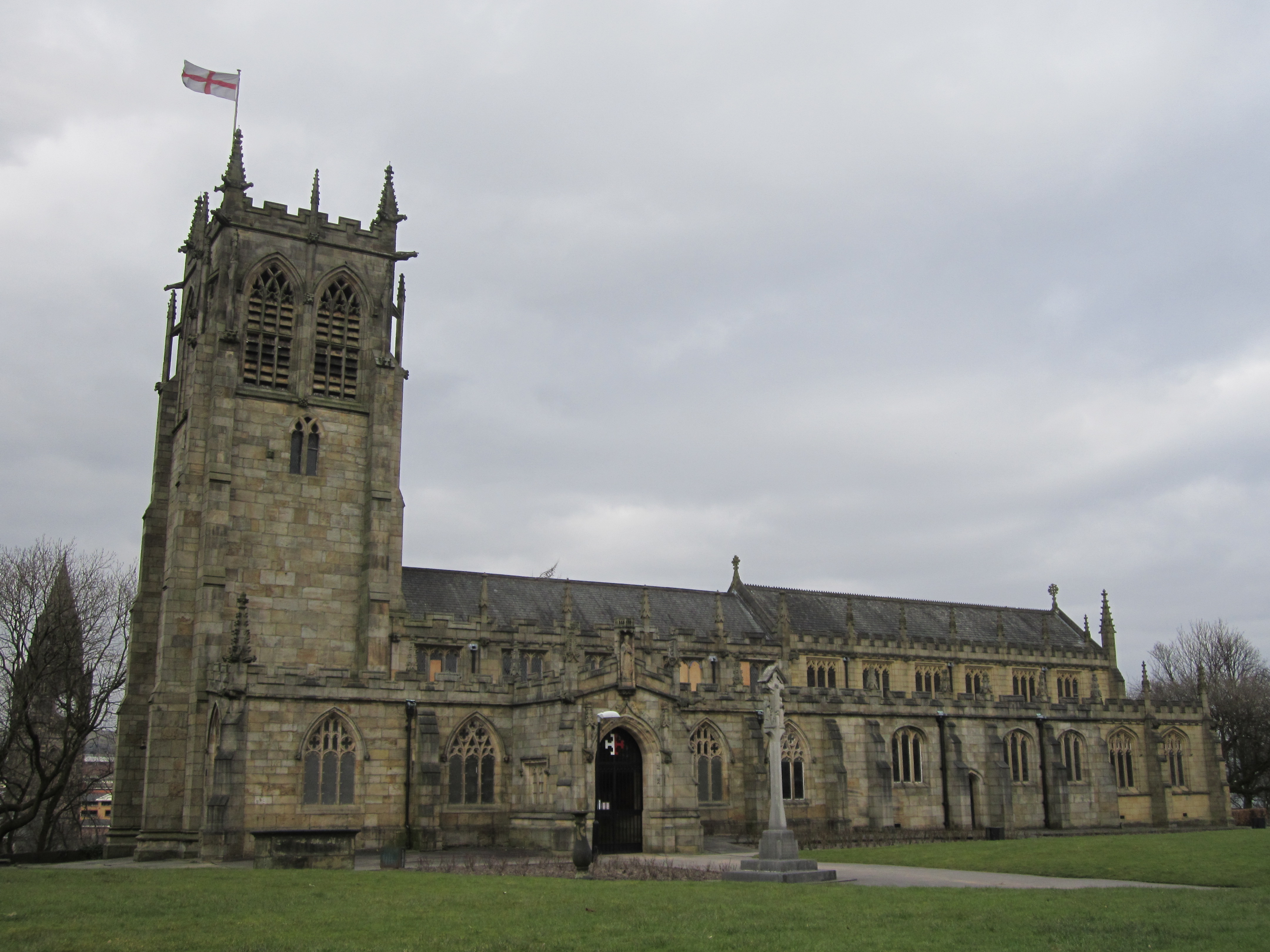
St Chad's Church, Rochdale's parish church

== Twin towns ==
The Metropolitan Borough of Rochdale has formal twinning arrangements with six places. Three were originally twinned with a place within the Metropolitan Borough boundaries prior to its creation in 1974.

Country	Place	County / District / Region / State	Originally twinned with	Date
France	Tourcoing	Nord-Pas de Calais	County Borough of Rochdale	1956
Germany	Peine	Niedersachsen	Municipal Borough of Heywood	1967
Germany	Bielefeld	Nordrhein-Westfalen	County Borough of Rochdale	1953
Pakistan	Sahiwal	Punjab	Metropolitan Borough of Rochdale	1988
Ukraine	Lviv	Lviv	Metropolitan Borough of Rochdale	1992
Bangladesh	Sylhet	Sylhet Division	Metropolitan Borough of Rochdale	2009

== Freedom of the Borough ==
The following people and military units have received the Freedom of the Borough of Rochdale.

=== Individuals ===
- Dame Gracie Fields: 6 May 1937.
- Cyril Smith: November 1992. (Smith's freedom of the borough award was revoked by a unanimous vote of the Rochdale Borough Council on 18 October 2018).
- Jim Callaghan: 3 April 1996.
- Lance Corporal Stephen Shaw: 26 May 2013.
- Joel Barnett, Baron Barnett: 23 April 2014.
- Julie Goodyear: 5 October 2017.
- Keira Walsh: 7 October 2022.
- Shelia Acton: 7 October 2022.
- David Kilpatrick
- Major Edmund Gartside
- Dr Musharraf Hussain
- John Kay
- Saeed Dar
- Razia Shamim

=== Military units ===
- The Lancashire Fusiliers: 5 June 1947.
- The Royal Regiment of Fusiliers: 4 March 1978.
- HMS Middleton, RN: 20 May 1992.

== See also ==
- Rochdale Metropolitan Borough Council elections
- List of people from Rochdale
- List of schools in Rochdale
