= Ealees Brook =

Ealees Brook River Ealees
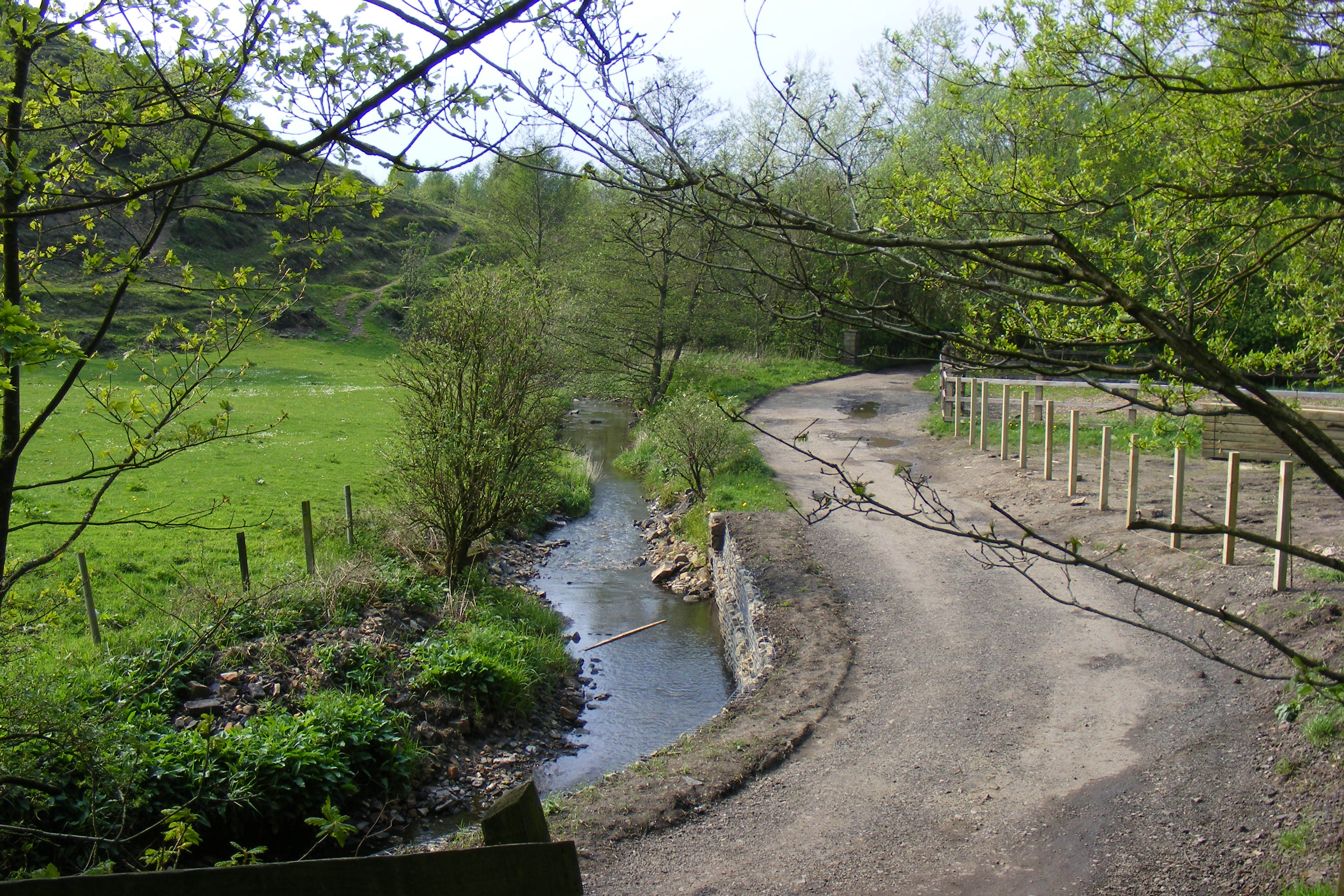

Location
- Country: England
- Region: Rochdale

Physical characteristics
- Source
  - location: Hollingworth Brook & Shore Lane Brook Confluence
- Mouth
  - location: River Roch, Littleborough
  - coordinates: 53°38′37.08″N 2°5′38.08″W

Ealees Brook is a water course in Greater Manchester named after the Ealees area of Littleborough. It flows northwards from the Ealees Valley to the River Roch in Littleborough.

== Tributaries ==
- Shore Lane Brook
- Hollingworth Brook
  - Brearley Brook
  - Longden End Brook (Hollingworth Lake)

| Next confluence upstream | River Roch | Next confluence downstream |
| Town House Brook | Ealees Brook | Featherstall Brook |
