= Stubley Old Hall =

Listed manor house in Littleborough, Greater Manchester, England

- Location within Greater Manchester

General information
- Status: Private residence
- Type: Manor house (former)
- Location: Featherstall Road, Littleborough, Greater Manchester, England
- Coordinates: 53.6410°N 2.1106°W
- Year built: 15th century (possible)
- Renovated: c. 1530 (wing added)
- Owner: Nik and Eva Speakman

Listed Building – Grade II*
- Official name: Stubley Old Hall
- Designated: 2 January 1967
- Reference no.: 1162360

Stubley Old Hall (also known as Stubley Hall) is a Grade II* listed manor house just south of Featherstall Road in Littleborough, a town within the Metropolitan Borough of Rochdale, Greater Manchester, England. Parts of the building are thought to date from the 15th century. The hall later served various functions, including as a pub‑restaurant in the 20th century. It was subsequently converted into a private residence by Nik and Eva Speakman. As of September 2026, the property is listed for sale.

== History ==
The medieval manor house was originally part of the Stubley estate and was acquired by John de Holt in 1330. Although not definitively verified, the hall is believed to have been rebuilt by Robert Holt around 1529. Over the centuries, the building has undergone various architectural changes, reflecting different construction techniques and styles.

On 2 January 1967, Stubley Old Hall was designated a Grade II* listed building. In the 20th century, the hall served various functions, including as a pub-restaurant before being listed for sale in 2000.

The hall and surrounding land were purchased by Nik and Eva Speakman, known for their television appearances and work as advisers to celebrities. They converted the property into a nine-bedroom residence. As of September 2026, Stubley Old Hall is listed for sale with an asking price of £2.85 million.

== Architecture ==
The house has a H-shaped plan with a central hall and two cross-wings. Two prominent chimney stacks with brattishing, dating to around 1600, are a defining feature of the north elevation. The south wing, the oldest part, is cruck-framed. The hall and north wing are timber-framed; the front was faced in stone around 1600, with later brickwork elsewhere. The hall is open to the roof, while the wings have two storeys. The building stands on a projecting plinth and features quoins and a stone-slate roof. The doorway has a chamfered surround and an angled lintel. The windows are mullioned or mullioned and transomed, some with hood moulds.

== See also ==
- Grade II* listed buildings in Greater Manchester
- Listed buildings in Littleborough, Greater Manchester
