= Handle Hall =

Listed building in Greater Manchester, England

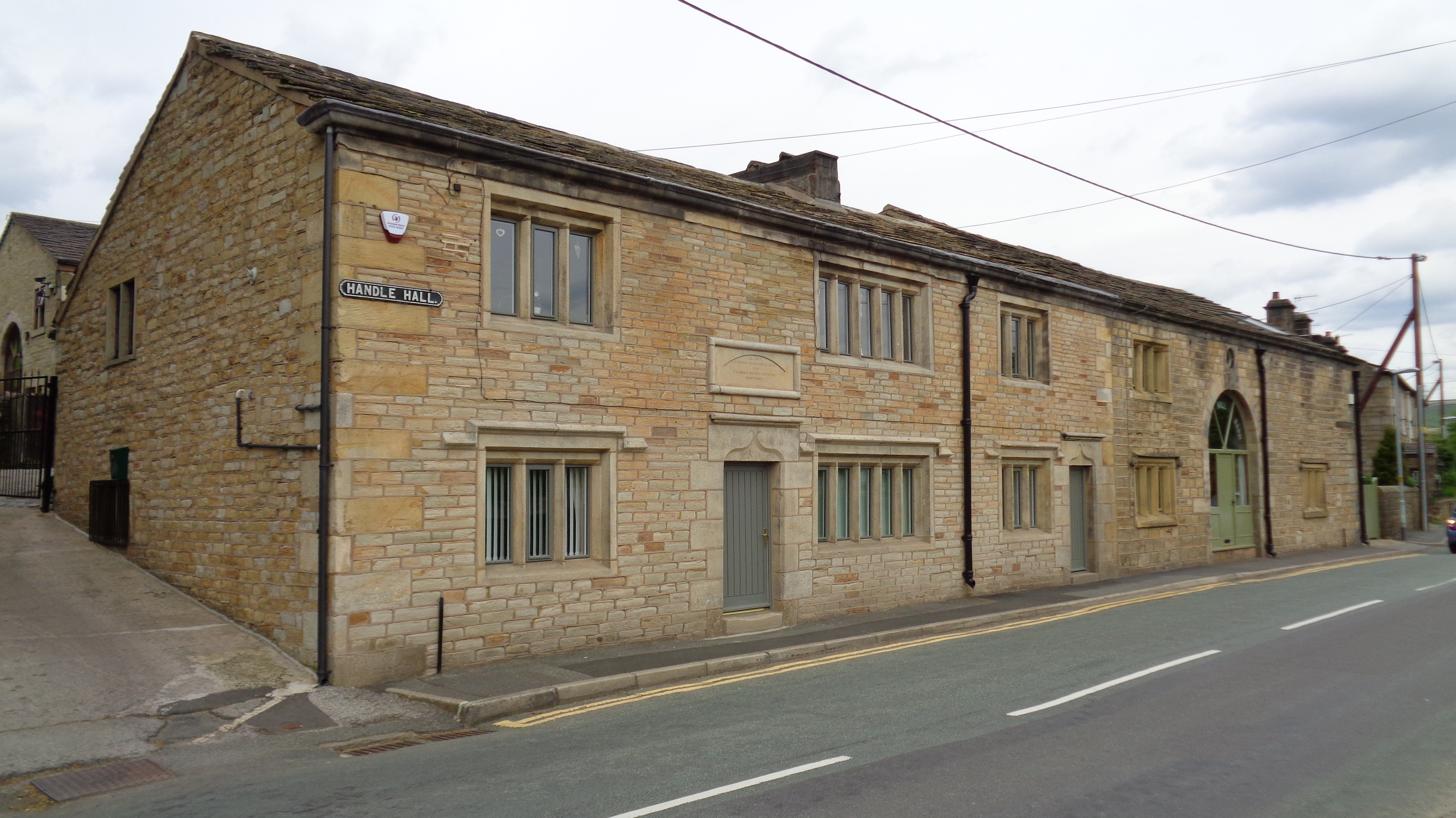
- Handle Hall in 2017

- Location within Greater Manchester

General information
- Type: Private residence
- Location: Calderbrook, Littleborough, Greater Manchester, England
- Coordinates: 53.6582°N 2.0924°W
- Year built: 1820

Design and construction
- Designations

Listed Building – Grade II
- Official name: Handle Hall
- Designated: 31 January 1980
- Reference no.: 1162173

Handle Hall is a privately owned Grade II listed historic house located in Calderbrook, Littleborough, Greater Manchester, England.

== History ==
In 1610 Richard Dearden (d. 1630) built the house he originally called "Warcock Hill" but the name was subsequently changed to "Handle Hall". Several of Dearden's descendants owned the house, including his son John Dearden (1655–87), grandson James Dearden (1682–1749), and James Dearden (1774–1828) who purchased the manorial rights and became Lord of the manor of Rochdale.

== Architecture ==
The present house is an 1820 rebuild of the 1610 house, with a barn added in the 1840s. It has ogee shaped lintels and hood moulds, double-chamfered mullion windows, and a door lintel stating 'A.S. 1610 Richard Dearden Struxit, 1820 Jacobus Domum De Novo Restituit' ('In the year of salvation 1610, Richard Dearden built [it], in 1820 James restored the house anew').

== See also ==
- Listed buildings in Littleborough, Greater Manchester
