= Hollingworth Brook =

Stream in Greater Manchester, England

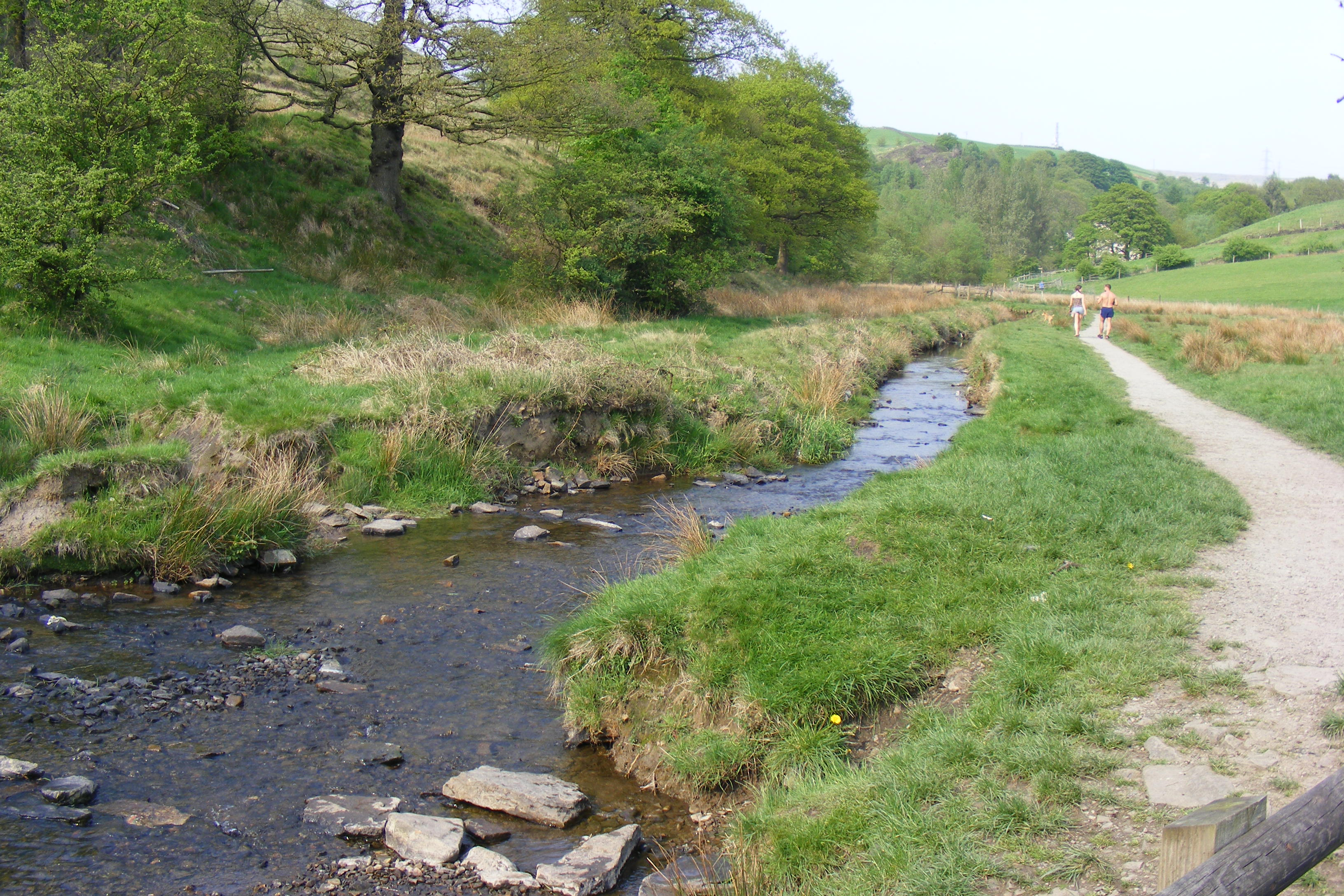

Location
- Country: England

Physical characteristics
- Source
  - location: Hollingworth Lake
- Mouth
  - location: Ealees Brook
  - coordinates: 53°38′23.10″N 2°05′07.74″W

Hollingworth Brook is a water course in Greater Manchester which originates at Hollingworth Lake and flows through the Ealees Valley where it merges with Shore Lane Brook to form Ealees Brook.

== Tributaries ==
- Brearley Brook
- Longden End Brook
- Shaw Moss Brook ?
