= The Old Duke =

The Old Duke may refer to:

- The Old Duke, Bristol, a jazz and blues venue and pub
- The Old Duke, Littleborough, a listed former pub in Greater Manchester, England
