= The Wheatsheaf, Littleborough =

Listed former pub in Greater Manchester, England

The Wheatsheaf
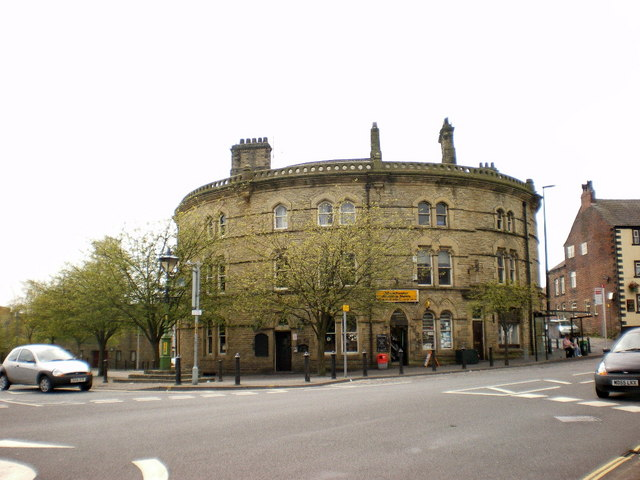
- The building in 2009

- Location within Greater Manchester

General information
- Status: Vacant
- Type: Public house (former)
- Location: 37 Church Street, Littleborough, Greater Manchester, England
- Coordinates: 53.6436°N 2.0959°W
- Year built: Early 1860s
- Closed: 2026
- Owner: Stonegate

Design and construction
- Designations

Listed Building – Grade II
- Official name: The Roundhouse, Wheatsheaf Buildings
- Designated: 23 April 1986
- Reference no.: 1068526

The Wheatsheaf is a Grade II listed former public house on Church Street (Note: The building's official listing gives its address as The Square, but its address is on Church Street.) in Littleborough, a town within the Metropolitan Borough of Rochdale, Greater Manchester, England. Built in the early 1860s, it stands on the site of an earlier inn of the same name, recorded as far back as 1780. Part of the semi‑circular building housed the pub, while the remainder is occupied by commercial premises. The Wheatsheaf closed in June 2026, and as of October no update on its future has been published.

== History ==
The present building dates from the early 1860s, according to its official listing. The name Wheat Sheaf is recorded much earlier, with directories listing Robert Hirst as publican in 1821 and the name itself documented as far back as 1780. The 1893 and 1941 Ordnance Survey maps record the building as a hotel, but do not attribute a name.

On 23 April 1986, the building was designated a Grade II listed structure. As of 2025, the pub's freehold is owned by Stonegate Pub Company. The pub closed in June 2026, and as of October no announcement regarding its future has been made.

== Architecture ==
The building is constructed from roughly finished stone and has a slate roof. It follows a curved plan, rises three storeys, and is divided into ten bays. There are continuous stone bands between the floors and a decorative parapet above the eaves. The windows vary by level: the ground floor has round‑headed openings with pointed surrounds, the first floor has shouldered heads, and the top floor has arched heads. Two shopfront windows sit on the north side. The doorways use a mix of arched and shouldered openings, and one entrance features small columns with carved capitals supporting a cusped arch and a multi‑foil panel above. Chimneys stand along the roof ridge. Inside, although much has been altered, some original elements remain, including fireplaces, plaster cornices, and a staircase with cast‑iron balusters.

== See also ==
- Listed buildings in Littleborough, Greater Manchester
- Listed pubs in Greater Manchester
