= Rake Inn =

Listed former pub in Littleborough, Greater Manchester, England

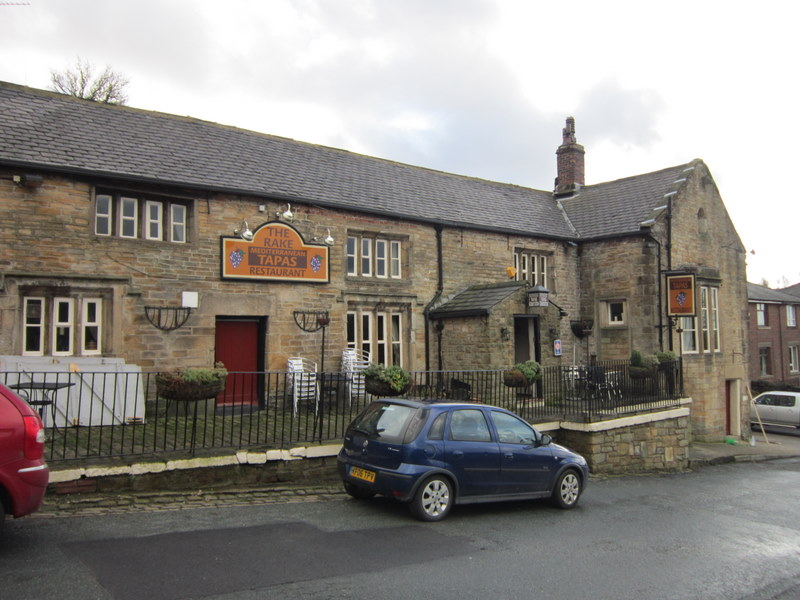
- The building in 2012

- Location within Greater Manchester
- Alternative names: The Rake; The Rake Tapas

General information
- Status: Converted to restaurant and hotel use
- Type: Public house (former)
- Location: 2 Blackstone Edge Old Road, Littleborough, Greater Manchester, England
- Coordinates: 53.6457°N 2.0863°W
- Year built: 1690; 336 years ago

Design and construction
- Designations

Listed Building – Grade II
- Official name: The Rake Inn
- Designated: 2 January 1967
- Reference no.: 1068535

Website
- theraketapas.co.uk

The Rake Inn is a Grade II listed former public house on Blackstone Edge Old Road in Littleborough, a town within the Metropolitan Borough of Rochdale, Greater Manchester, England. Built in 1690, it was in use as a pub for over 300 years and, since 2007, has operated primarily as a tapas restaurant and hotel.

== History ==
The building was constructed in 1690, as indicated by an inscription on its door surround, according to its official listing. It was later altered and extended. The 1893 and 1930 Ordnance Survey maps record the building as the Rake Inn.

On 2 January 1967, the Rake Inn was designated a Grade II listed building. Since 2007, the pub has operated primarily as a tapas restaurant and also provides guest accommodation.

== Architecture ==
The building is constructed in roughly finished stone with a slate roof. Its layout forms a T‑shape, with four bays across two floors. The central part is the earliest, containing the main doorway, which has a shaped stone frame and a later porch. On both levels it is flanked by wide, four‑part windows; those on the ground floor were later enlarged and fitted with protective mouldings above.

The left-hand section has a mix of three and four‑part windows and another doorway with a dressed stone frame. The right-hand end, forming the top of the T, includes a projecting bay window and a small upper window set beneath an arched head. The gable ends are finished with coping stones, and the right side wall has been rendered. At the back, later lean‑to additions cover much of the elevation, though several original stone‑framed windows of different widths remain visible. There are chimney stacks along the roof ridge and at the gables.

Inside, the building retains features such as shaped ceiling beams and a fireplace with a moulded surround and a shallow arched opening with a dropped keystone.

== See also ==
- Listed buildings in Littleborough, Greater Manchester
- Listed pubs in Greater Manchester
