= Long Clough =

Listed building in Greater Manchester, England

- Location within Greater Manchester

General information
- Type: Private residence
- Location: Clough Road, Littleborough, Greater Manchester, England
- Coordinates: 53.6574°N 2.1079°W

Design and construction
- Designations

Listed Building – Grade II
- Official name: Long Clough Farmhouse
- Designated: 23 April 1986
- Reference no.: 1366286

Long Clough is a privately owned Grade II listed historic house in Littleborough, a town in the Metropolitan Borough of Rochdale, Greater Manchester, England.

== History ==
Various families have resided at Long Clough since the 17th century. One example is the Stansfield family, who lived there from at least 1697 until the 1860s, spanning John Stansfield (d. 1721) to James Stansfield (1785–1861). The building now operates as Long Clough Care Home, providing nursing and personal care.

== Architecture ==
The farmhouse preserves a door lintel dated 1725 (though a house certainly existed earlier), and it also features mullion windows and coped gables with kneelers, as well as gable and ridge chimney stacks.

== See also ==
- Listed buildings in Littleborough, Greater Manchester
