= Lees Radcliffe =

English cricketer (1865–1928)

Personal information
- Full name: Lees Radcliffe
- Born: 23 November 1865; Smithy Bridge, Littleborough, England
- Died: 22 January 1928 (aged 62); Crumpsall, Manchester, England
- Batting: Right-handed
- Role: Wicket-keeper

Domestic team information
- Years: Team
- 1911: Durham
- 1897–1905: Lancashire

Career statistics
| Competition | First-class |
|---|---|
| Matches | 50 |
| Runs scored | 275 |
| Batting average | 6.11 |
| 100s/50s | –/– |
| Top score | 25 |
| Balls bowled | – |
| Wickets | – |
| Bowling average | – |
| 5 wickets in innings | – |
| 10 wickets in match | – |
| Best bowling | – |
| Catches/stumpings | 70/34 |
- Source: Cricinfo, 7 September 2011

Lees Radcliffe (23 November 1865 – 22 January 1928) was an English cricketer. Radcliffe was a right-handed batsman who fielded as a wicket-keeper. He was born in Smithy Bridge, Littleborough, Lancashire.

Radcliffe made his first-class debut for Lancashire against Sussex in the 1897 County Championship. He made 49 further first-class appearances for the county, the last of which came against Sussex in the 1905 County Championship. In his 50 first-class matches, he scored 275 runs at an average of 6.11, with a high score of 25. His role within the team was as a specialist wicket-keeper. In his role as a wicket-keeper, he took 70 catches and made 34 stumpings. The 1905 season was his last playing for Lancashire. Years later in 1911, Radcliffe played two Minor Counties Championship matches for Durham against Cheshire and Norfolk.

He died at Crumpsall, Lancashire on 22 January 1928.
