= Shore Hall =

Listed house in Littleborough, Greater Manchester, England

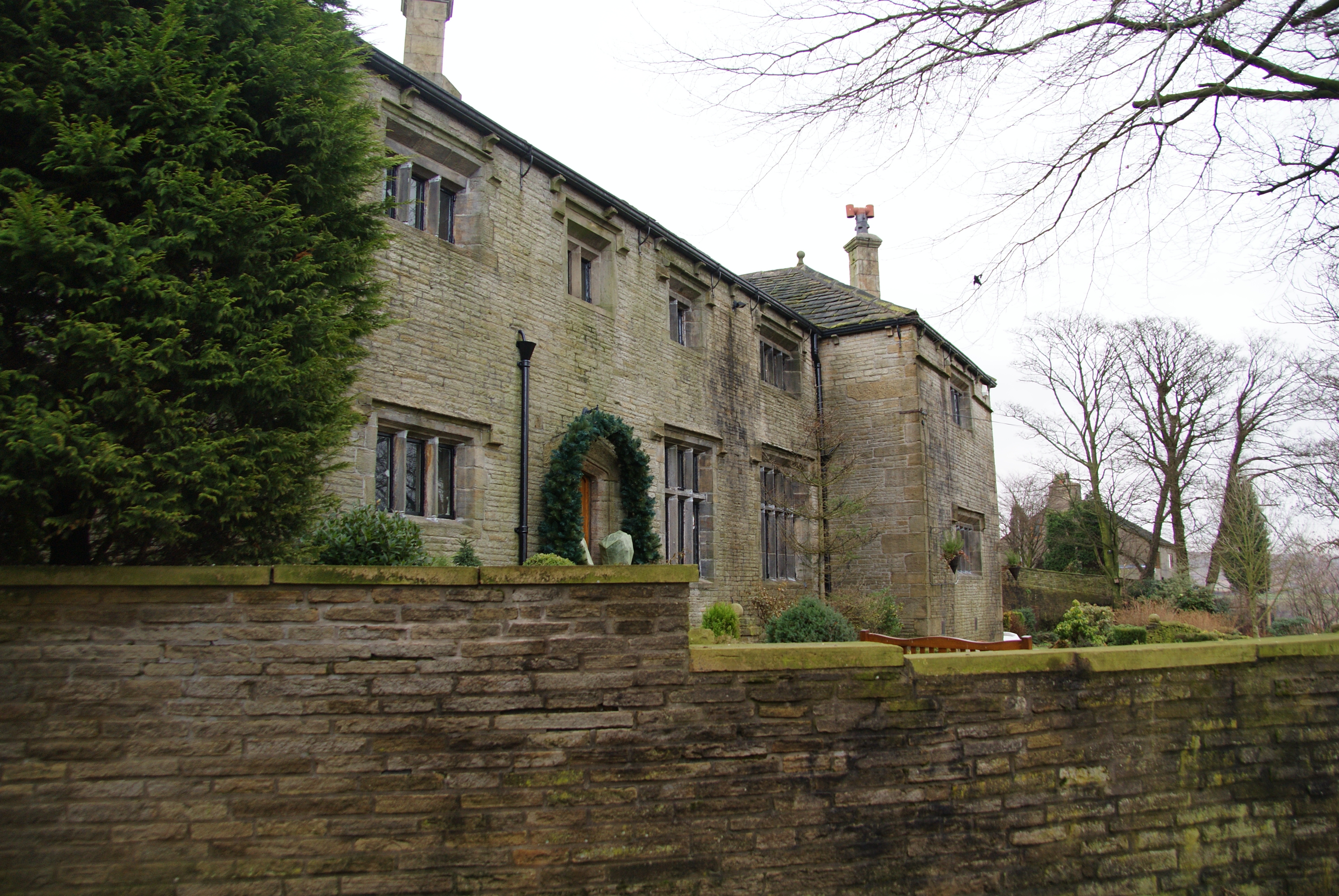
- Shore Hall in 2010

- Location within Greater Manchester

General information
- Status: Converted into a holiday let
- Type: Yeoman's house (former)
- Architectural style: Vernacular
- Location: Higher Shore Road, Littleborough, Greater Manchester, England
- Coordinates: 53.6514°N 2.1181°W
- Year built: 1605; 421 years ago

Listed Building – Grade II*
- Official name: Shore Hall
- Designated: 2 January 1967
- Reference no.: 1068515

Shore Hall is an early-17th-century yeoman's house on Higher Shore Road in Littleborough, a town within the Metropolitan Borough of Rochdale, Greater Manchester, England. It is notable as a well-preserved example of vernacular domestic architecture from the period. The building is Grade II* listed, recognised for its architectural features and historical importance.

== History ==
The house bears the inscription "IB 1605" on the door lintel, which is believed to refer to James Bamford, an early owner or builder. The date suggests the property was constructed in the early 17th century.

In 1641 Robert Shore, a yeoman, leased a property called Shore to Edmund Whitehead for 99 years, subject to the life of Dorothy, wife of Jeremy Duerden. In 1647 a marriage settlement was recorded between Thomas Shore, son and heir of Robert, and Elizabeth Bamford, daughter of James Bamford. The Shore family continued to reside at the property until the late 18th century.

On 2 January 1967, Shore Hall was designated a Grade II* listed building.

The most recent recorded use of the hall, as of December 2024, was as a holiday rental.

== Architecture ==
The building is constructed of hammer-dressed stone with a graduated stone-slate roof. It follows a T-shaped hearth-passage plan comprising five bays and two storeys.

The exterior features quoins, a projecting plinth, and a main entrance in bay two with a heavily chamfered surround, carved stops, and a Tudor-arched lintel. The house includes a variety of mullioned and transomed windows: a three-light fire window and a five-light mullion and transom window in the house-part (both enlarged in the 20th century), along with three-light and five-light mullion windows in bays one and five. The first floor features windows arranged as follows: one with three lights, three with two lights each, and one with four lights. All windows are double-chamfered with hoodmoulds, and some mullions are cavetto-moulded.

Additional features include shaped eaves gutter brackets, a left gable coped with a ball finial, and a cross-wing that was originally gabled but is now hipped. There are three diagonally set chimney stacks with cornices, one projecting on the right return. The right return also has two and three-light windows, while the left return has four-light windows, some of which are 20th-century copies. At the rear, there is a similar chamfered door surround and a two-light cavetto-moulded mullion window. The rear of the cross-wing contains 18th-century flat-faced mullion windows of three and four lights, along with a lean-to extension.

=== Interior ===
The interior includes a large stone fireplace in the house-part with an elliptical head, cyma-moulded surround, and ogee-moulded cornice, possibly replacing an earlier smoke hood. Other features include hewn beams, chamfered detailing, and one forked beam.

== See also ==
- Grade II* listed buildings in Greater Manchester
- Listed buildings in Littleborough, Greater Manchester
