= Old Bent House and Farmhouse =

Listed house in Littleborough, Greater Manchester, England

- Location within Greater Manchester

General information
- Location: Halifax Road, Littleborough, Greater Manchester, England
- Coordinates: 53.6495°N 2.0826°W
- Year built: Late 17th century

Listed Building – Grade II*
- Official name: Old Bent House and Bent House Farmhouse
- Designated: 2 January 1967
- Reference no.: 1356234

Listed Building – Grade II
- Official name: Barn and shippon south-east of Old Bent Farmhouse
- Designated: 23 April 1986
- Reference no.: 1356235

Listed Building – Grade II
- Official name: Barn and shippon immediately to east of Old Bent Farmhouse
- Designated: 23 April 1986
- Reference no.: 1068510

Listed Building – Grade II
- Official name: Stone post in front garden of Old Bent House
- Designated: 23 April 1986
- Reference no.: 1068511

Old Bent House and Farmhouse (officially listed as Old Bent House and Bent House Farmhouse) are adjoining historic buildings on Halifax Road in Littleborough, a town within the Metropolitan Borough of Rochdale, Greater Manchester, England. They are jointly recorded in the National Heritage List for England as a Grade II* listed building.

== History ==
The house bears the inscription "IMS 1691" on its door and porch lintels, indicating construction in the late 17th century, likely for John and Mary Scott. The initials "IS" and "MS 1692" appear on interior fittings, confirming early ownership. Over time, the property underwent 19th and 20th-century additions, but retains much of its original character. The double-depth plan is considered an early example for a yeoman farmer's house, marking its architectural importance.

Bent House was later associated with the Stott family, prominent in Littleborough during the 17th and 18th centuries. The Stotts left detailed day books documenting household and trading life.

On 2 January 1967, Old Bent House and Farmhouse were designated a Grade II* listed building.

== Architecture ==
The building is constructed from hammer-dressed stone and topped with a graduated stone-slate roof. Its layout follows a three-unit, double-depth plan, consisting of four bays arranged over two storeys, which reflects the architectural style of its period.

A prominent feature of the exterior is the single-storey porch, which includes a moulded door surround and a segmental-arched lintel. The spandrels are enriched with decorative detailing, and the parapet above forms a simple classical entablature. The windows are equally distinctive: the ground floor contains three six-light mullioned windows with hood moulds, while the upper floor features a combination of four-light and two-light chamfered windows. Many of these openings retain their original leaded lights and iron bars, adding to the building's historic character.

The gables are coped and finished with kneelers, and the chimneys display moulded bands. Inside, the property preserves several original fittings, including a studded oak door, a plank-and-muntin screen, and a 17th-century well cupboard with butterfly hinges. A bolection-moulded fire surround adds further period detail. Notably, a cupboard on the first floor bears the carved inscription "MS 1692," offering a tangible link to the building's early history.

== Nearby listed structures ==
Three Grade II-listed buildings and structures stand in close proximity. Immediately south-east of the farmhouse is a barn and shippon, originally serving as a stable. Built from hammer-dressed watershot stone with a graduated stone-slate roof, it features a large central doorway with a chamfered surround, flanking windows, and dressed owl holes in each gable. A datestone inscribed "IMS 1750" links the building to John and Mary Stott, the family associated with the main house.

Another barn and shippon stands immediately east of Old Bent Farmhouse, also listed for its architectural value. In the front garden of Old Bent House is a stone post, believed to be the remains of a sundial dated 1745, listed for its group value with the house.

== See also ==
- Grade II* listed buildings in Greater Manchester
- Listed buildings in Littleborough, Greater Manchester
