= Nik & Eva Speakman =

British therapists and life coaches

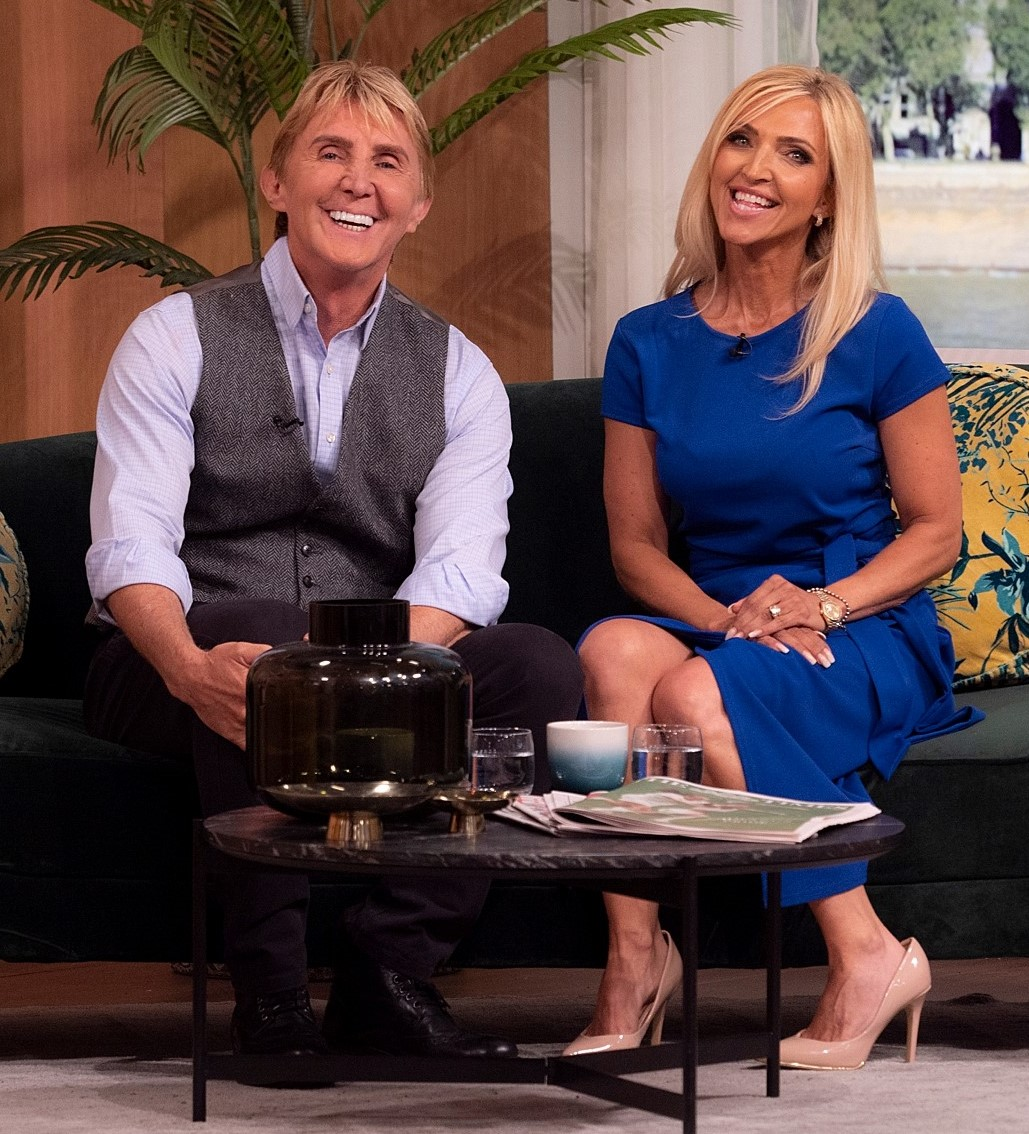
- Born: Nik Speakman; 7 December 1961 (age 63); England; Eva Speakman; 30 April 1969 (age 56); England
- Occupation: Schema conditioning therapists
- Children: 2
- Website: nikandeva.com

Nik Speakman (born 7 December 1961) and Eva Speakman (born 30 April 1969), known collectively as The Speakmans, are British writers, therapists, life coaches and TV presenters known for their regular contributions on ITV's This Morning.

== Career ==
Nik Speakman was working as a success coach at the time of his and Eva's 2005 appearance in That's Rich, a Granada Television series focusing on entrepreneurs in the north-west of England. Eva Speakman ran the Heavenly Bodies gym in Oldham at the time of the show. The Speakmans were subsequently hosts of a Living TV show, A Life Coach Less Ordinary, and in 2007 published a book titled You Can Be Fantastic, Too!.

Since 2010 the couple have been resident therapists on ITV's This Morning, hosting a segment about issues and anxiety disorders ranging from obsessive–compulsive disorder to fears, phobias and post-traumatic stress disorder. In 2014, the pair briefly hosted a spin-off daytime ITV show of their own entitled The Speakmans. The couple also took part in series five of Celebrity Hunted in 2023 for charity Stand Up to Cancer.

The Speakmans are also known for developing a therapy known as Visual Schema Displacement Therapy (VSDT).

== Philanthropy ==
The Speakmans are ambassadors for Variety, the children’s charity, and they support Stand Up to Cancer. Also, Nik Speakman is the founder and CEO of Trauma Research UK.

== Personal life ==
The Speakmans have two children, and they live in Littleborough near Rochdale in Greater Manchester.

== Bibliography ==
- Conquering Anxiety (2019)
- Winning at Weight Loss (2019)
- Everyday Confidence (2021)
