= Brearley Brook =

Stream in Greater Manchester, England

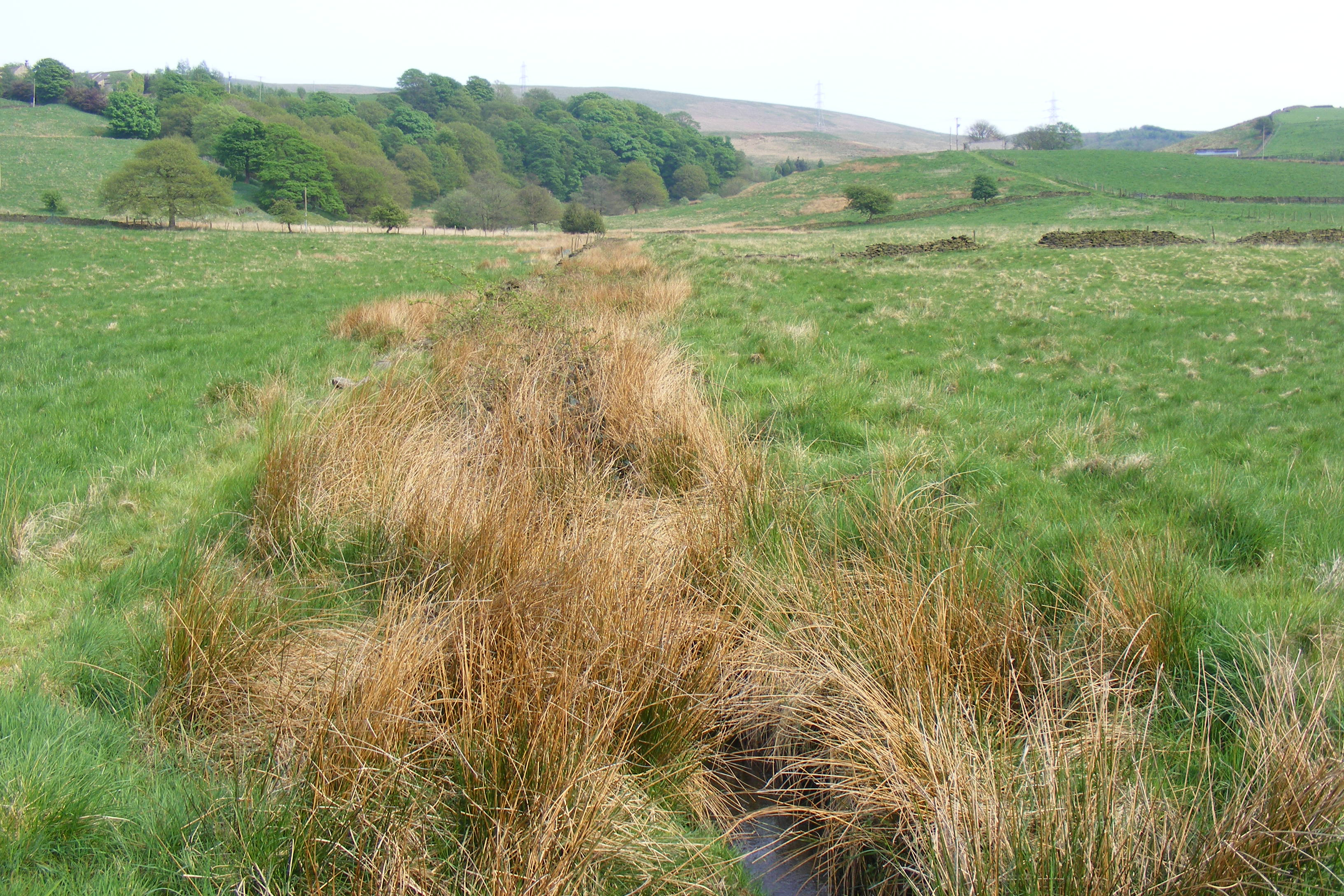

Location
- Country: England

Physical characteristics
- Source
  - location: Syke
- Mouth
  - location: Hollingworth Brook
  - coordinates: 53°38′13.97″N 2°05′16.54″W

Brearley Brook is a watercourse in Greater Manchester and a tributary of Hollingworth Brook. The original source was on Low House Moor but this has been diverted under the M62 Motorway to join Longden End Brook. The brook now originates at Syke, and follows the original course.
