= Visual schema displacement therapy =

Visual schema displacement therapy (VSDT) is a therapeutic approach developed to mitigate distressing memories and trauma. It shares some similarities with eye movement desensitization and reprocessing (EMDR), as both techniques seek to facilitate the reprocessing of memories by reducing emotional disturbances, in line with the adaptive information processing model.

== History ==
VSDT was developed by British psychotherapists Nik & Eva Speakman. Research on VSDT was first published in 2019 through two analogue studies. The initial study used a within-group design, comparing the effects of VSDT and EMDR to a control condition. The second study applied a between-group design, incorporating follow-up assessments. Results indicated that both VSDT and EMDR were more effective than the control at reducing emotional disturbance and memory vividness, with VSDT showing some advantages over EMDR.

Further research investigated potential mechanisms, such as counterconditioning and arousal due to unexpected elements, but these did not conclusively explain the efficacy of the treatments. At a four-week follow-up, both VSDT and EMDR demonstrated comparable results. These findings suggested the need for additional research and clinical trials to understand the mechanisms and effectiveness of VSDT, particularly for treating conditions like PTSD.

== Clinical trials ==
In 2024, a clinical post-traumatic stress disorder (PTSD) trial by Suzy J. M. A. Matthijssen et al. evaluated the effectiveness of VSDT and EMDR therapy in reducing PTSD symptoms, finding both therapies equally effective compared to a waitlist control, with sustained benefits at a 3-month follow-up. The study confirmed the safety and clinical feasibility of VSDT, noting no adverse events and a feasible dropout rate. It also highlighted that VSDT requires less time per treatment target than EMDR, although the total number of sessions remained similar.
