= Listed buildings in Littleborough, Greater Manchester =

Littleborough is a town in the Metropolitan Borough of Rochdale, Greater Manchester, England, and it is unparished. The town, its suburbs of Calderbrook and Smithy Bridge, and the surrounding countryside contain 79 listed buildings that are recorded in the National Heritage List for England. Of these, five are listed at Grade II*, the middle grade, and the others are at Grade II, the lowest grade. The area is largely rural, and most of the listed buildings are houses and associated structures, farmhouses, and farm buildings. Following the Industrial Revolution textile mills were built, some of which remain and are listed. The Rochdale Canal passes through the area and bridges and locks associated with it are listed. Also passing through the area was the Manchester and Leeds Railway, and structures associated with it are listed. The other listed buildings include churches, public houses, a former toll house, a bandstand, a drinking fountain, and two war memorials.

== Key ==
Grade	Criteria
II*	Particularly important buildings of more than special interest
II	Buildings of national importance and special interest

== Buildings ==
Name and location	Photograph	Date	Notes	Grade
Stubley Old Hall; 53.64107°N 2.11061°W	—	15th century (possible)	A H-shaped house with a hall and cross-wings. The south wing is the oldest, and is cruck-framed. The hall and north wing are timber framed, the front was encased in stone in about 1600, and the rest later in brick. The hall is open to the roof, and the wings have two storeys. The house is on a projecting plinth and has quoins and a stone-slate roof. The doorway has a chamfered surround and an obtuse-angled lintel, and the windows are mullioned and transomed or mullioned, some with hood moulds.	II*
Shore Hall; 53.65148°N 2.11813°W		1605	The house has a T-shaped plan with a main range and a cross-wing on the right. It is in stone on a projecting plinth, with quoins and moulded eaves brackets. There are two storeys, five bays, and an outshut at the rear of the cross-wing. The roof is in stone-slate, the left gable is coped with a ball finial, and the cross-wing has a hipped roof. The doorway has a chamfered surround and a Tudor arched lintel, and the windows are mullioned with hood moulds.	II*
Windy Bank; 53.64636°N 2.08530°W		1611	The house is basically timber framed and is encased in gritstone on a projecting plinth, with quoins, gargoyles, and a stone-slate roof with coped gables and finials. It has an L-shaped plan with a main range, and a rear wing which is the earliest part. There are two storeys, and the main range has four bays and three gables. The windows are mullioned with hood moulds.	II*
Dearnley Old Hall; 53.63882°N 2.11923°W		Early to mid-17th century (probable)	A house in rendered stone on a projecting plinth that has a stone-slate roof with coped gables. There are two storeys, three bays, and a parallel range at the rear. The paired doors have chamfered surrounds and flat-arched lintels, and the windows are mullioned with hood moulds. Inside is a timber framed partition.	II*
Barn and shippon east of Old Bent Farmhouse; 53.64946°N 2.08221°W	—	1668	The building is in stone with quoins, and a stone-slate roof with coped gables. It is a long building, with an outshut on the front, and lean-to extensions to the right and rear. The barn contains two cart entries, two winnowing doors, windows and doorways, one with a dated and initialled lintel.	II
Higher Windy Bank Farmhouse and barn 53.64544°N 2.08430°W	—	Late 17th century	The farmhouse was altered in the 18th century, and the barn added to the right in the 19th century. The house is on a projecting plinth, with quoins and a stone-slate roof. There are two storeys, two bays, and a right outshut. The house has a central porch, a moulded doorway with an obtuse-angled lintel, and a coped parapet, and the windows are mullioned. In the barn is a round-headed cart entry, a segmental-headed shippon door, and other doors and windows.	II
Former farmhouse west of Whittaker Farmhouse; 53.63654°N 2.08143°W	—	Last quarter of 17th century	The farmhouse was extended in the mid-18th century, a parallel range was added at the rear in the late 18th century, and it has since been used for other purposes. The building is in stone on a projecting plinth with quoins, and has a stone-slate roof with coped gables. There are two storeys and five bays. On the front is a gabled porch, and the windows are mullioned.	II
The Rake Inn; 53.64576°N 2.08639°W		1690	The former public house, now tapas restaurant and hotel, has been altered and extended. It is in stone, partly rendered, with quoins, a slate roof with coped gables, and a T-shaped plan. There are two storeys and four bays, with a cross-wing on the right. On the front is a gabled porch and mullioned windows in the first three bays, and in the gable end of the cross-wing is a canted bay window. The windows in the ground floor have hood moulds.	II
Castle Farmhouse and barn 53.65576°N 2.06006°W	—	1691	A combined farmhouse and barn dating mainly from the 18th century. It is in stone with quoins and a slate roof. There are two storeys and three bays, with the barn to the left. The doorway has a square-cut surround, there is a 20th-century porch in the third bay, and most of the windows are mullioned, with some replaced windows.	II
Old Bent House and Farmhouse; 53.64955°N 2.08268°W	—	1691	The house was enlarged in the 19th and 20th centuries. It is in stone on a projecting plinth, with quoins and a stone-slate roof with coped gables. There is a double-depth plan, two storeys, four bays, and an 18th-century single-storey extension at the rear right. The single-storey porch has a doorway with a moulded surround, a segmental-arched lintel with enriched spandrels and inscribed initials and date, and a parapet. The windows on the front are mullioned with hood moulds, and on the sides and rear are mullioned and sash windows. There is a later porch to the rear.	II*
Barn, Mowrode Farm; 53.66188°N 2.08494°W	—	1708	The barn is in stone with quoins and a stone-slate roof. It contains opposed cart entries, a blocked barn door with a dressed surround and a massive lintel, shippon doors with chamfered surrounds and elliptical heads, and lean-to extensions at the rear.	II
Long Clough; 53.65741°N 2.10787°W	—	1725	A stone farmhouse with quoins and a 20th-century tiled roof with coped gables. It has a single-depth plan, two storeys and three bays. There are two doorways, one with a chamfered surround and a dated and initialled lintel, and the other with a square-cut surround. The windows are mullioned.	II
1 Ealees; 53.64357°N 2.08950°W	—	Early 18th century	A stone house with quoins and a stone-slate roof. There are two storeys, two bays, and a small 20th-century lean-to extension. In the centre is a porch, and the windows are mullioned with some mullions missing. In the gable end is a blocked doorway.	II
Former winter bee-house, Pike Barns; 53.64976°N 2.08038°W	—	Early 18th century	The bee-house is in stone with quoins and a stone-slate roof. It consists of single room approached by external steps above an undercroft. It has a doorway with a chamfered surround, a hatch, and a casement window. Inside are two tiers of bee boles.	II
Humber Farmhouse and barn 53.64493°N 2.07858°W	—	Early 18th century	The barn is the older, the farmhouse dating from the mid-18th century. The house is on a projecting plinth, with quoins, and a stone-slate roof with coped gables. It has a single-depth plan, two storeys and two bays. There is a central porch wing, a doorway with a chamfered surround, and the windows are mullioned. The barn to the right contains opposing cart entries, a shippon door, a lean-to extension and a wing at the rear.	II
Lightowlers Cottage; 53.65184°N 2.07955°W	—	Early 18th century	A stone house incorporating earlier material, with quoins and a stone-slate roof. There are two storeys, three bays, a lean-to extension to the right, and a later left wing. On the front is a gabled porch, and the windows are mullioned.	II
Rough Farmhouse; 53.64459°N 2.06922°W	—	Early 18th century	The farmhouse was at one time used as a toll house. It is in stone on a projecting plinth, with quoins and a stone-slate roof. The house has a single-depth plan, two storeys, two bays, and a barn to the left with lean-to extensions. The windows in the house are mullioned, and in the barn is a cart entry.	II
Hollingworth Fold; 53.63049°N 2.08803°W	—	1727	A stone house on a projecting plinth, with quoins and a stone-slate roof. There are two storeys, two bays, and a rear outshut. In the centre is a doorway, and most of the windows are mullioned. In the right gable end is a doorway and an inserted sash window.	II
Stone post, Old Bent House; 53.64941°N 2.08281°W	—	1745	The stone post, possibly originally a sundial, consists of a square shaft with corner beads, surmounted by a rectangular dated stone.	II
Barn and shippon southeast of Old Bent Farmhouse; 53.64938°N 2.08234°W	—	1750	The building is in stone with quoins and a stone-slate roof. It has a large central doorway with a chamfered surround, a datestone above, and windows on each side. There are owl holes in both gables, and a window and loft hatch at the rear.	II
4 and 5 Sladen Fold; 53.65734°N 2.07900°W	—	Mid-18th century	A stone house with quoins and a stone-slate roof. There are two storeys, three bays, and a two-storey rear wing. On the front are two porches, and most of the windows are mullioned.	II
Lower Shore Farmhouse; 53.64897°N 2.11451°W	—	Mid-18th century	A farmhouse, later a private house, in stone on a projecting plinth, with a roof partly in slate and partly in stone-slate. There are two storeys, three bays, and later extensions to the rear and to the right. The central doorway has an architrave and a hood, and most of the windows are mullioned. In the right extension are quoins and casement windows.	II
Lydgate Cottage; 53.64486°N 2.07271°W	—	Mid-18th century	A house, at one time cottages, in stone with quoins and a stone-slate roof. There are two storeys, two bays, a single-bay extension to the left, and a later porch. The porch is gabled with two storeys, the doors have square-cut surrounds, and the windows are mullioned.	II
Sladen Fold Farmhouse; 53.65726°N 2.07876°W	—	Mid-18th century	A stone house that has a stone-slate roof with coped gables. There are two storeys, two bays, and a rear outshut. On the front is a porch, and the windows are mullioned.	II
Sundial; 53.65128°N 2.11795°W	—	18th century	The sundial shaft is in the garden of Higher Shore Hall. It is in stone and consists of a square baluster with a moulded head. The dial and gnomon are missing.	II
Town House Mill; 53.65090°N 2.09703°W	—	1752	Formerly a wool warehouse, later used for other purposes, it is in stone with quoins and a stone-slate roof. There are three storeys and six bays, the fourth to sixth bays projecting forward. The windows are mullioned, in bays one and three are doorways with square-cut surrounds, and in bay two is a blocked taking-in door. Bay five has a doorway and above are taking-in doors, all with segmental heads and keystoness. (Note: Street View in June 2012 shows that the building has been converted for residential use.)	II
2–7 Calderbrook Road; 53.65991°N 2.08973°W	—	Mid to late 18th century	A terrace of five stone houses with quoins and a stone-slate roof. They have a single-depth plan, two storeys, one bay each, and rear extensions. The doorways have square-cut surrounds, and the windows are mullioned.	II
Whitfield Farmhouse; 53.65571°N 2.08913°W	—	Mid to late 18th century	The farmhouse incorporates earlier material, and is in stone on a projecting plinth, with quoins and a 20th-century tiled roof. There are four bays, the first bay projects slightly and has a single storey, and the other bays have three storeys. In the centre are double doors, one blocked, and the windows are mullioned, one with a hood mould.	II
1 and 2 Far Hey Head and barn 53.65970°N 2.10147°W	—	Late 18th century	A pair of houses and a barn to the left, the last dating from the 19th century, in stone with slate roofs. The houses have three storeys, one bay each, a lean-to extension to the front left with a stone-slate roof, a small right wing, and a lean-to extension at the rear. The windows are mullioned, some of them former workshop windows. The barn has quoins, and a blocked round-headed cart entry.	II
5 Old Road; 53.64669°N 2.08044°W	—	Late 18th century	A stone house with a stone-slate roof, two storeys, two bays, and a rear outshut. The doorway has a square-cut surround, and the windows are mullioned. To the left of each bay is a full-height stone post with fixing lugs, and at the rear is a 20th-century window, a door and a dormer window.	II
Booth Hollings Mill; 53.62187°N 2.07450°W		Late 18th century	A rear wing was added to the former textile mill in the 19th century, forming an L-shaped plan. The mill is in stone with a slate roof. The original range has two storeys and contained a water wheel. It has a segmental-arched entry, now blocked, two doorways, five windows in the ground floor, and a full-length mullioned window in the upper floor. The wing has eight bays, it incorporates an engine house and a boiler room, and has a square chimney.	II
New Nook; 53.62389°N 2.06499°W	—	Late 18th century	Originally three houses, later used for other purposes, they are in stone with a stone-slate roof. They have a double-depth plan, two storeys, and each former house has one bay. The doorways are on the right, the windows are mullioned, and there are taking-in doors at the rear.	II
Whitfield Cottage; 53.65571°N 2.08894°W	—	Late 18th century	A stone house with quoins and a slate roof. There are two storeys, two bays, a right lean-to extension, and central double doorways with square-cut surrounds, one of which is blocked. Some windows are mullioned, and others have been altered.	II
Benthouse Bridge; 53.65017°N 2.08435°W		Between 1794 and 1798	This is bridge No. 46, an accommodation bridge over the Rochdale Canal. It is in stone, and has a single elliptical arch, with a hump-back, rusticated voussoirs, keystones, a band, a parapet with rounded copings, and square end piers.	II
Eales Road Bridge; 53.64378°N 2.09062°W		Between 1794 and 1798	This is bridge No. 49, carrying Eales Road over the Rochdale Canal. It is in stone, and has a single elliptical arch, with rusticated voussoirs, keystones, a band, a parapet with rounded copings, and square end piers.	II
Lock No. 39; 53.66125°N 2.08193°W		Between 1794 and 1798	The lock on the Rochdale Canal is in stone and has double upper gates. At the lower end are retaining walls containing boatman's steps.	II
Lock No. 45 and Pikehouse Bridge; 53.65304°N 2.08266°W		Between 1794 and 1798	The lock on the Rochdale Canal is in stone and has double upper gates. At the south is a tailgate in stone that has a single segmental arch. The bridge has a band, a parapet with rounded copings, and square end piers.	II
Lock No. 46 and Windy Bank Bridge; 53.65304°N 2.08266°W		Between 1794 and 1798	The lock on the Rochdale Canal is in stone and has double upper gates. At the south is a tailgate in stone that has a single elliptical arch. The bridge has a band and a parapet consisting of large vertically set stones.	II
Lodge Bridge; 53.63538°N 2.10905°W		Between 1794 and 1798	A road bridge, later a footbridge, crossing the Rochdale Canal. It is in stone, and has a single elliptical arch, with a hump-back, rusticated voussoirs, keystones, a band, a parapet with rounded copings, and square end piers.	II
Freshwater Cottage; 53.62647°N 2.08600°W	—	1790s	Originally three cottages, later one house, it is in stone with quoins and a stone-slate roof. The doorways have square-cut surrounds, and most of the windows are mullioned, with workshop windows in the upper floor. At the rear is a blocked taking-in door.	II
Town House; 53.65065°N 2.09658°W	—	1798	The house was extended at the rear in 1915. It is in ashlar stone on a projecting plinth with a band, an eaves cornice and a slate roof. The house has two storeys, a symmetrical front of five bays, the middle three bays projecting forward under a pediment with a circular window in the tympanum. The central doorway has three-quarter columns, a radial fanlight, an archivolt with a keystone, and an open pediment. The windows are sashes, and in the left return is a stair window with a moulded surround, and at the rear is a two-storey bow window.	II
Barn west of Shore Hall; 53.65148°N 2.11855°W	—	c. 1800	The barn is in stone with quoins, shaped eaves gutter brackets, a stone-slate roof, and a later rear outshut. It contains opposing segmental-headed cart entries, doors and circular openings. On the right gable end is a Venetian window with a keystone, above which is a doorway with a square-cut surround and a fanlight, and an owl hole.	II
1 and 3 Whittaker Fold; 53.63663°N 2.08124°W	—	Late 18th to early 19th century	A pair of stone houses with quoins and a stone-slate roof. They have a double-depth plan, three storeys, and one bay each, with a lean-to extension on the left. The doorway has a square-cut surround, and the windows are mullioned.	II
Coach House Heritage Centre; 53.64423°N 2.09525°W	—	Late 18th to early 19th century	Originally a coach house, later used as a heritage centre, the building is in stone with quoins, shaped eaves brackets, and a stone-slate roof. There are two storeys and four bays. In the first bay are opposed segmental-headed coach entries, above which on the front is a small round-headed window with impost blocks and a keystone. To the right are three doorways with chamfered surrounds. In the left return is a Venetian window, and in the right return is a coach entry. The gables both have an oval-shaped opening and an owl hole.	II
1 and 3 Salley Street; 53.66347°N 2.08666°W	—	1801	A pair of stone houses with quoins and a stone-slate roof. They have a double-depth plan, two storeys, one bay each, and the doorways have square-cut surrounds. The windows were originally mullioned, some mullions have been removed, and some windows have been altered.	II
Holy Trinity Church; 53.64424°N 2.09396°W		1818–20	The church, replacing an earlier church on the site, was designed by Thomas Taylor, and the chancel was added in 1889 by J. S. Crowther. It is in stone with a slate roof, and consists of a nave on a plinth, with gargoyles and an embattled parapet, a taller chancel, and a west steeple. The steeple has a three-stage tower, flanked at the base by stair bays, a doorway, a coped parapet with a gabled clock face on each side, corner pinnacles, and a spire with lucarnes. The chancel is in Perpendicular style, with crocketed pinnacles and a seven-light east window.	II
Handle Hall; 53.65820°N 2.09235°W		1820	The rebuilding of a house of 1610, with the barn added in the 1840s, they are in stone with a stone-slate roof. The house has quoins, an eaves cornice, two storeys and three bays. There are two doorways with ogee-headed lintels and hood moulds, and the windows are mullioned, those in the ground floor with hood moulds. Above a door is an inscribed and dated plaque. The barn to the right has a round-arch wagon entrance and round windows.	II
The Old Duke; 53.64311°N 2.08867°W		1820	Originally a house, three cottages were added to the rear in the 1850s, and later combined into one house. The building was used as a public house in 1860, and since a private house. It is in stone with quoins and a stone-slate roof. The house has a single-depth plan, three storeys and three bays. The windows in the lower two floors are sashes and casements, and there is a continuous mullioned workshop window in the top floor. The former cottages have one bay each, a doorway with a square-cut surround, and mullioned window.	II
6 Church Street and 2 Todmorden Road; 53.64403°N 2.09341°W		c. 1824	A former toll house, on a corner site, in stone with a stone-slate roof. It has two storeys and a basement, two bays and a canted corner. There are two doorways with square-cut surrounds, and the windows are casements.	II
1, 2, 3 and 4 Middle Newgate; 53.65472°N 2.09889°W	—	Early 19th century	A terrace of four stone houses with a stone-slate roof. They have two storeys and one bay each, and there is a small extension at the rear. The doorways have square-cut surrounds, and most of the windows are mullioned, with some 20th-century windows at the rear.	II
3 Sladen Fold and barn 53.65754°N 2.07924°W	—	Early 19th century	The house and barn are in stone with quoins and a stone-slate roof. The house has a single-depth plan, two storeys, and two bays, with the slightly earlier barn to the left. In the house is a central doorway with a square-cut surround, and the windows are mullioned. The barn has opposing cart entries, and an outshut to the left with a slate roof and a doorway with a chamfered surround.	II
3 Bear Hill; 53.63131°N 2.09028°W	—	Early 19th century	A stone house with quoins, and a stone-slate roof with coped gables. It has a single-depth plan, two storeys, two bays, and a later brick wing and a conservatory at the rear. On the front is a central doorway with a square-cut surround, and mullioned windows, including a twelve-light workshop window in the upper floor. In the right gable end are four 20th-century casement windows.	II
4 Laws Terrace and 18, 20 and 22 New Street; 53.64083°N 2.11278°W	—	Early 19th century	Two houses and a pair of back-to-back houses in stone with quoins and a stone-slate roof. They have three storeys, and each house has two bays and a central doorway with a square-cut surround. The windows are mullioned, some with six or seven lights, and there is a taking-in door converted into a window.	II
8–12 Calderbrook Road; 53.65503°N 2.09867°W	—	Early 19th century	A terrace of five stone houses with quoins and a roof partly of stone-slate and partly of 20th-century tiles. The houses have a double-depth plan, two storeys, and one bay each. The doorways have square-cut surrounds, and the windows are mullioned, those in the upper floor having five (previously seven) lights.	II
57, 59, 61 and 63 Smithy Bridge Road and 2 and 3 Wrigley Place; 53.63272°N 2.10968°W	—	Early 19th century	A row of back-to-back houses, later incorporating a shop, in stone with quoins and a stone-slate roof. They have three storeys, doorways with square-cut surrounds, and mullioned windows, including workshop windows in the upper floors, some with blocked lights.	II
58 Summit and 3 and 4 Fielden Street; 53.66297°N 2.08338°W	—	Early 19th century	Originally four, later three houses in stone with quoins and a stone-slate roof. They have two storeys and four bays. There is a 20th-century porch, the windows are mullioned, there is a blocked shop window, and an entrance at basement level on the right.	II
Barn north of 1 and 3 Whittaker Fold; 53.63679°N 2.08133°W	—	Early 19th century	The barn is in stone with quoins and has a stone-slate roof with coped gables. It contains opposing elliptical-headed cart entries and circular pitching holes above. These are flanked by doorways with square-cut surrounds and more pitching holes. In the right gable is loft hatch, and in the left return are two more pitching holes.	II
Barn, shippon and workshop, Syke House Farm; 53.63060°N 2.08034°W		Early 19th century	The buildings are in stone with stone-slate roofs. In the barn are opposed cart entries with segmental heads and keystones, and circular windows above. The workshop has two storeys and three bays, a central doorway with a square-cut surround and a segmental head, and windows with wedge lintels.	II
Barrat Farmhouse and barn 53.65868°N 2.06360°W	—	Early 19th century	A combined farmhouse and barn in stone with a stone-slate roof. The house to the right projects forward, it has a double-depth plan and one bay. There is a porch in the angle, some windows are mullioned and others have square-cut surrounds. The barn has a central arched cart entry with impost blocks flanked by doors with square-cut surrounds and windows, and above is an arched window with impost blocks, a keystone and a dated lintel.	II
Bents Farmhouse and barn 53.64242°N 2.11188°W	—	Early 19th century	The farmhouse and barn are in stone and has a stone-slate roof with coped gables. The house has quoins, a double-depth plan, two storeys and two bays. In the centre is a porch with a coped gable, and the doorway has a chamfered surround and an obtuse-angled lintel. The windows have mullions, one also has a transom, and all have hood moulds. The barn to the right has a lean-to extension, a rendered gable, opposed segmental-arched cart entries, pitching holes, and ventilation slits.	II
Hey Bottom Farmhouse and barn 53.65657°N 2.09687°W	—	Early 19th century	A combined farmhouse and barn in stone with quoins, and a stone-slate roof with coped gables. The house has two storeys, three bays, and a rear wing. There is a central doorway with a square-cut surround, and the windows are mullioned. The barn to the right has rear lean-to extensions, a segmental-headed entry and a shippon door.	II
Higher Shore Farmhouse and barn 53.65170°N 2.11838°W	—	Early 19th century	The farmhouse and barn are in stone with a stone-slate roof. The house has two storeys and two bays, and the windows are mulliond. The barn to the left is dated 1849, and has a rear outshut. It contains an elliptical headed entry, above which is a small window with a segmental lintel and impost blocks.	II
Hillview; 53.64335°N 2.08887°W	—	Early 19th century	A pair of cottages later combined into one house, in stone with quoins and a stone-slate roof. Each cottage has one room and an attic room, and a rear lean-to extension was added later. The doorways have square-cut surrounds, and each cottage has a two-light mullioned window containing a casement. There are gable lights in the attics and a later dormer at the rear.	II
Paul Row; 53.66084°N 2.08526°W	—	Early 19th century	A row of cottages, originally eight, later six, in stone with a stone-slate roof. They have a double-depth plan, two storeys, and one bay each. The doorways have square-cut surrounds. The windows were originally mullioned, and some have been altered.	II
Wilmers; 53.66678°N 2.08382°W	—	c. 1830	Originally four cottages and a workshop or cellar dwelling, later one house, it is in stone with a stone-slate roof. There is a double-depth plan, two storeys, four bays, and a left lean-to extension. On the front is a 20th-century porch and four doorways with square-cut surrounds, and the windows are mullioned.	II
Stormer Hill Bar; 53.64844°N 2.06433°W		1838	Originally a toll house provided for the Rochdale to Halifax and Elland Turnpike road, later a private house. A bay was added to the left in 1911 and a gabled porch to the front. The house is in stone with a brick porch and a left bay in brick on a stone plinth, and it has a stone-slate roof. There is one storey at the front, two at the rear, and a lean-to porch at the rear. The windows are sashes.	II
Railway Viaduct; 53.64367°N 2.09324°W		1839	The viaduct was built by the Manchester and Leeds Railway, and is in stone. It consists of six elliptical arches, the northern being a skew arch. The arches have keystones, rusticated voussoirs, piers with impost blocks, and coped parapets with bands.	II
Southern entrance of railway tunnel beneath Todmorden Road; 53.65921°N 2.08293°W	—	1839	The tunnel was built by the Manchester and Leeds Railway. The entrance to the tunnel is in stone, and consists of a segmental arch with a keystone. Above this is a band and a coped parapet, and it is flanked by tapering piers. On the parapet is a datestone containing the emblem of the railway company.	II
River Roch Aqueduct; 53.65865°N 2.08294°W		c. 1839	The aqueduct was built by the Manchester and Leeds Railway to carry the River Roch over the railway. It is in stone with cast iron walls, and has an S-shaped plan with a segmental skew arch.	II
Southern entrance to Summit Tunnel; 53.66052°N 2.08310°W		1841	The tunnel was built by the Manchester and Leeds Railway. The entrance to the tunnel is in stone, and consists of a horseshoe arch, and has voussoirs with radial rustication. At parapet level are two bands.	II
County boundary stone 53.65947°N 2.03588°W		Mid-19th century	The boundary stone marks the boundary between the historical counties of Lancashire and Yorkshire. It has two angled faces and carries an inscription denoting its function.	II
St James' Church; 53.66031°N 2.09014°W		1860–64	The church, designed by George Shaw, is in stone and has a slate roof with coped gables and cross finials. It consists of a nave, a north aisle, a chancel, a central south steeple, and a south chapel. There is a bellcote between the nave and the chancel. The steeple has a three-stage tower with buttresses and a circular corner stair turret. At the top stage the tower broaches to an octagon, and it is surmounted by a spire.	II
The Roundhouse, Wheatsheaf Buildings; 53.64367°N 2.09577°W		Early 1860s	A building with a semicircular plan containing a public house and shops in stone with a slate roof. There are three storeys and ten bays, and it has a sill band, an impost band, an eaves cornice, and a pierced parapet. On the ground floor are two shop windows, and the other windows are sashes.	II
Folly; 53.64707°N 2.09809°W	—	c. 1900 or earlier	The folly in Hare Hill Park consists of a grotto with a pool and containing a single-room building about 5 metres (16 ft) square and 2.5 metres (8 ft 2 in) tall with rounded corners and a flat roof. On the southern side is a small cast iron water wheel about 1 metre (3 ft 3 in) in diameter. The wheel is turned by water from a pipe and channel on the roof, and falls into the pool. On the west side of the building is a deep niche, and on the east side is a recess with a stone bench.	II
Bandstand; 53.64657°N 2.09744°W		1902	The bandstand in Hare Hill Park has an octagonal plan. Steps lead to a platform on a gritstone base with a chamfered plinth. Four square decorative cast iron columns support a felted roof that has a central vent with a scrolled finial and a gold crown. On the plinth is an inscribed plaque.	II
Drinking fountain 53.64634°N 2.09690°W		1902	The drinking fountain in Hare Hill Park is in gritstone and polished granite, and is about 3 metres (9.8 ft) tall. It consists of a two-stepped base, a two-stage plinth, polished granite bowls, a shaft with recesses containing taps or inscriptions, a pyramidal roof with triangular pediments, and a squat spire.	II
Littleborough War memorial 53.64350°N 2.09513°W		1922	The war memorial stands in a semicircular garden, it was designed by Bradshaw Gass & Hope, and is in York stone. It consists of an obelisk on a square pedestal on a stepped platform. On the front of the obelisk is a carved wreath, and on the top is a stone with a carved cross on each of four faces. On the front of the pedestal is an inscribed plaque, and behind the obelisk is a curved wall containing the names of those lost in both World Wars.	II
Shore Mill War Memorial; 53.64995°N 2.10895°W		Early 1920s	The war memorial stands in a memorial garden, and commemorates the employees of Shore Mill who were lost in the two World Wars. It is in granite and consists of a Latin cross on a tapering rectangular shaft, on a pedestal with canted sides, on a chamfered plinth. On the front of the cross is a roundel containing a Tudor rose. On the pedestal is an inscription and the names of those lost in the First World War, and on the plinth are the names of those lost in the Second World War.	II
63, 65, 67 and 69 Rakewood Road and 2 Schofield Hall Road; 53.62441°N 2.08520°W	—	Undated	A row of five stone houses with a stone-slate roof. They have single and double-depth plans, three storeys, each house has one bay, and there is a rear outshut. In the first bay is a segmental-arched cart entry. Most of the windows are mullioned, with workshop windows in the upper floors, and there is one casement window.	II

== Notes and references ==
=== Sources ===
- Historic England, "Stubley Old Hall, Littleborough (1162360)", National Heritage List for England
- Historic England, "Shore Hall, Littleborough (1068515)", National Heritage List for England
- Historic England, "Windy Bank, Littleborough (1068536)", National Heritage List for England
- Historic England, "Dearnley Old Hall, Littleborough (1309691)", National Heritage List for England
- Historic England, "Barn and shippon immediately to east of Old Bent Farmhouse, Littleborough (1068510)", National Heritage List for England
- Historic England, "Higher Windy Bank Farmhouse and adjoining barn, Littleborough (1068532)", National Heritage List for England
- Historic England, "Former farmhouse west of Whittaker Farmhouse, Littleborough (1309627)", National Heritage List for England
- Historic England, "The Rake Inn, Littleborough (1068535)", National Heritage List for England
- Historic England, "Castle Farmhouse and adjoining barn, Littleborough (1068531)", National Heritage List for England
- Historic England, "Old Bent House and Bent House Farmhouse, Littleborough (1356234)", National Heritage List for England
- Historic England, "Barn adjacent to Mowrode Farmhouse, Littleborough (1068525)", National Heritage List for England
- Historic England, "Long Clough Farmhouse, Littleborough (1366286)", National Heritage List for England
- Historic England, "No. 1 Ealees, Littleborough (1162194)", National Heritage List for England
- Historic England, "Lightowlers Cottage, Littleborough (1068517)", National Heritage List for England
- Historic England, "Humber Farmhouse and adjoining barn, Littleborough (1068533)", National Heritage List for England
- Historic England, "Former winter bee-house at Pike Barns, Littleborough (1162280)", National Heritage List for England
- Historic England, "Rough Farmhouse, Littleborough (1068534)", National Heritage List for England
- Historic England, "Hollingworth Fold, Littleborough (1162368)", National Heritage List for England
- Historic England, "Stone post in front garden of Old Bent House, Littleborough (1068511)", National Heritage List for England
- Historic England, "Barn and shippon southeast of Old Bent Farmhouse, Littleborough (1356235)", National Heritage List for England
- Historic England, "Nos. 4 and 5 Sladen Fold, Littleborough (1162349)", National Heritage List for England
- Historic England, "Lower Shore Farmhouse, Littleborough (1068514)", National Heritage List for England
- Historic England, "Lydgate Cottage, Littleborough (1366285)", National Heritage List for England
- Historic England, "Sladen Fold Farmhouse, Littleborough (1068524)", National Heritage List for England
- Historic England, "Sundial in garden of Higher Shore Hall, Littleborough (1309716)", National Heritage List for England
- Historic England, "Town House Mill, Littleborough (1309654)", National Heritage List for England
- Historic England, "Nos. 2–7 Calderbrook Road, Littleborough (1068538)", National Heritage List for England
- Historic England, "Whitfield Farmhouse, Littleborough (1162398)", National Heritage List for England
- Historic England, "Far Hey Head and No. 2 Far Hey Head and adjoining barn, Littleborough (1068513)", National Heritage List for England
- Historic England, "No. 5 Old Road, Littleborough (1366284)", National Heritage List for England
- Historic England, "Booth Hollings Mill, Littleborough (1068529)", National Heritage List for England
- Historic England, "New Nook, Littleborough (1068519)", National Heritage List for England
- Historic England, "Whitfield Cottage, Littleborough (1366281)", National Heritage List for England
- Historic England, "Rochdale Canal Lock No. 39, Littleborough (1162311)", National Heritage List for England
- Historic England, "Rochdale Canal Lock No. 45 and Pikehouse Bridge, Littleborough (1068521)", National Heritage List for England
- Historic England, "Rochdale Canal Lock No. 46 and Windy Bank Bridge, Littleborough (1356237)", National Heritage List for England
- Historic England, "Rochdale Canal Benthouse Bridge, Littleborough (1162331)", National Heritage List for England
- Historic England, "Rochdale Canal Eales Road Bridge, Littleborough (1309668)", National Heritage List for England
- Historic England, "Rochdale Canal Lodge Bridge, Littleborough (1068522)", National Heritage List for England
- Historic England, "Freshwater cottage, Littleborough (1162303)", National Heritage List for England
- Historic England, "Town House, Littleborough (1068527)", National Heritage List for England
- Historic England, "Barn immediately west of Shore Hall, Littleborough (1068516)", National Heritage List for England
- Historic England, "Nos. 1 and 3 Whittaker Fold, Littleborough (1366282)", National Heritage List for England
- Historic England, "Littleborough Coach House Heritage Centre (1162288)", National Heritage List for England
- Historic England, "Nos. 1 and 3 Salley Street, Littleborough (1068523)", National Heritage List for England
- Historic England, "Church of the Holy Trinity, Littleborough (1068518)", National Heritage List for England
- Historic England, "Handle Hall and adjoining barn, Littleborough (1162173)", National Heritage List for England
- Historic England, "The Old Duke, Littleborough (1068508)", National Heritage List for England
- Historic England, "No. 6 Church Street and No. 2 Todmorden Road, Littleborough (1162186)", National Heritage List for England
- Historic England, "No. 3 Bear Hill, Littleborough (1068530)", National Heritage List for England
- Historic England, "Nos. 8–12 Calderbrook Road, Littleborough (1068541)", National Heritage List for England
- Historic England, "No. 4 Laws Terrace and Nos. 18, 20 and 22 New Road, Littleborough (1068520)", National Heritage List for England
- Historic England, "Nos. 1, 2, 3 and 4 Middle Newgate, Littleborough (1162180)", National Heritage List for England
- Historic England, "No. 3 Sladen Fold and adjoining barn, Littleborough (1366278)", National Heritage List for England
- Historic England, "Nos. 57, 59, 61 and 63 Smithy Bridge Road and Nos. 2 and 3 Wrigley Place, Littleborough (1309675)", National Heritage List for England
- Historic England, "No. 58 Summit, Littleborough (1162381)", National Heritage List for England
- Historic England, "Barn immediately north of Nos. 1 and 3 Whittaker Fold, Littleborough (1068528)", National Heritage List for England
- Historic England, "Barrat Farmhouse and adjoining barn, Littleborough (1366283)", National Heritage List for England
- Historic England, "Bents Farmhouse and adjoining barn, Littleborough (1366279)", National Heritage List for England
- Historic England, "Hey Bottom Farmhouse and adjoining barn, Littleborough (1068540)", National Heritage List for England
- Historic England, "Higher Shore Farmhouse and adjoining barn, Littleborough (1162275)", National Heritage List for England
- Historic England, "Hillview, Littleborough (1068542)", National Heritage List for England
- Historic England, "Paul Row, Littleborough (1309683)", National Heritage List for England
- Historic England, "Barn, shippon and workshop adjoining west of Syke House and farmhouse, Littleborough (1366280)", National Heritage List for England
- Historic England, "Wilmers, Littleborough (1309750)", National Heritage List for England
- Historic England, "Stormer Hill Bar, Littleborough (1068512)", National Heritage List for England
- Historic England, "Railway Viaduct, Littleborough (1068509)", National Heritage List for England
- Historic England, "River Roch aqueduct over railway, Littleborough (1309744)", National Heritage List for England
- Historic England, "Southern entrance of railway tunnel beneath Todmorden Road, Littleborough (1068537)", National Heritage List for England
- Historic England, "Southern entrance to Summit (railway tunnel), Littleborough (1162164)", National Heritage List for England
- Historic England, "Boundary stone 200m from junction with Turvin Road (B6138), Littleborough (1278212)", National Heritage List for England
- Historic England, "Church of St. James, Littleborough (1068539)", National Heritage List for England
- Historic England, "The Roundhouse, Wheatsheaf Buildings, Littleborough (1068526)", National Heritage List for England
- Historic England, "Folly at Hare Hill Park, Littleborough (1096140)", National Heritage List for England
- Historic England, "Hare Hill Park Band Stand, Littleborough (1096139)", National Heritage List for England
- Historic England, "Drinking Fountain at Hare Hill Park, Littleborough (1096138)", National Heritage List for England
- Historic England, "Littleborough War Memorial (1436965)", National Heritage List for England
- Historic England, "Shore Mill War Memorial, Littleborough (1441226)", National Heritage List for England
- Historic England, "Brook Cottage and End View Cottage, Littleborough (1356236)", National Heritage List for England
- Historic England, Listed Buildings
- Hartwell, Clare; Hyde, Matthew; Pevsner, Nikolaus (2004), Lancashire: Manchester and the South-East, The Buildings of England, New Haven and London: Yale University Press, ISBN 0-300-10583-5
