= The Old Duke, Littleborough =

Listed former pub in Greater Manchester, England

The Old Duke
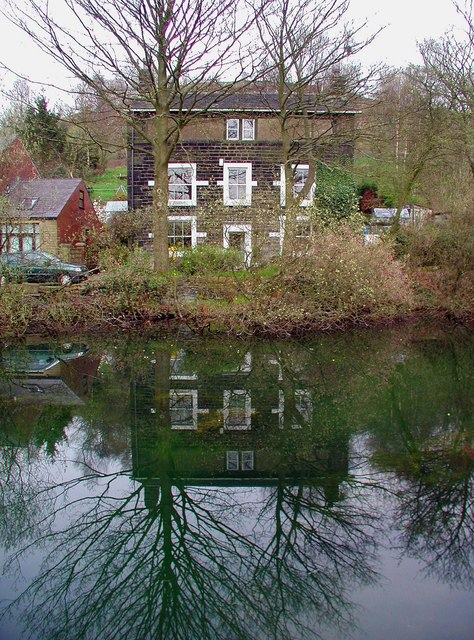
- The building in 2007

- Location within Greater Manchester
- Former names: Duke of Norfolk

General information
- Type: House (former public house; originally a house)
- Location: Ealees, Littleborough, Greater Manchester, England
- Coordinates: 53.6431°N 2.0886°W
- Year built: 1820; 206 years ago
- Renovated: 1850s (cottages added)
- Client: Edmund Kershaw

Design and construction
- Designations

Listed Building – Grade II
- Official name: The Old Duke
- Designated: 23 April 1986
- Reference no.: 1068508

The Old Duke is a Grade II listed former public house on Ealees in Littleborough, a town within the Metropolitan Borough of Rochdale, Greater Manchester, England. Built in 1820 as a house, three cottages were added to the rear in the 1850s and later combined into one dwelling; by 1860 it was in use as a pub known as the Duke of Norfolk, before later returning to private residential use.

== History ==
The building was constructed in 1820 for the engine maker Edmund Kershaw, according to its official listing. Three workers' cottages were added to the rear in the 1850s, and all four properties were later combined into a single residence. By 1860 it was in use as a public house known as the Duke of Norfolk, though the 1893 Ordnance Survey map does not record the building as such.

On 23 April 1986, the Old Duke was designated a Grade II listed building; it is now in use as a private residence.

== Architecture ==
The building is constructed in dressed stone with a stone‑slate roof. It has a single‑depth plan with a central entrance, three bays and three storeys, with three small cottages attached at the rear, each originally having one room plus an attic and cellar. The front is symmetrical, with corner stones, a central doorway with plain surrounds, and sash windows on the ground and first floors, two of which have been replaced with later casements. The top floor has a long workshop window, although many of its original openings have been filled in. There are chimney stacks on the gables. The rear cottages, entered at first‑floor level, each have a plain doorway, a two‑light window, and raised eaves to allow for an additional storey.

== See also ==
- Listed buildings in Littleborough, Greater Manchester
- Listed pubs in Greater Manchester
