= Dexter Fitton =

English cricketer (born 1965)

Personal information
- Full name: John Dexter Fitton
- Born: 24 August 1965 (age 61); Littleborough, Lancashire, England
- Batting: Left-handed
- Bowling: Right-arm off break

Domestic team information
- Years: Team
- 1994: Cumberland
- 1987–1992: Lancashire

Career statistics
Competition	First-class	List A
Matches	52	22
Runs scored	872	132
Batting average	18.95	18.85
100s/50s	–/1	–/–
Top score	60	36
Balls bowled	8,391	846
Wickets	82	23
Bowling average	53.15	32.13
5 wickets in innings	1	–
10 wickets in match	–	–
Best bowling	6/59	4/26
Catches/stumpings	11/–	4/–
- Source: Cricinfo, 24 September 2011

John Dexter Fitton (born 24 August 1965) is a former English cricketer. Fitton is a left-handed batsman who bowls right-arm off break. He was born in Littleborough, Lancashire.

Fitton made his first-class debut for Lancashire against Hampshire in the 1987 County Championship. He made 51 further first-class appearances for the county, the last of which came against Sussex in the 1992 County Championship. In these matches, he took 82 wickets at an average of 53.15, with best figures of 6/59. These figures, one of three five wicket hauls he took, came against Yorkshire in 1988. As a bowling all-rounder, Fitton had some ability with the bat, scoring 872 runs at a batting average of 18.95, with a high score of 60. This score, which was his only first-class fifty, came against Northamptonshire in 1991. His List A debut came against Gloucestershire in the 1987 Refuge Assurance League. He made twenty further List A appearances for Lancashire, the last of which came against Derbyshire in the 1992 Sunday League. In his twenty List A matches for the county, he took 23 wickets at an average of 32.13, with best figures of 4/26. With the bat, he scored 131 runs at an average of 21.83, with a high score of 36. He left Lancashire at the end of the 1993 season.

Dexter was the overseas professional player for the Sydenham Cricket Club in Christchurch New Zealand between 1987 and 1992, scoring over 2000 runs, with a top score of 183. He also took 83 wickets with a best of 5/29.

In 1994, Fitton made a single List A appearance for Cumberland in the NatWest Trophy against Leicestershire. He scored a single run in this match, before being dismissed by Phil Simmons, while in Leicestershire's innings he wasn't required to bowl. This was Fitton's only match for Cumberland, he didn't feature in any Minor counties match for them. He later played club cricket in the Central Lancashire League for Norden Cricket Club, before the League's demise.
