= Shore Lane Brook =

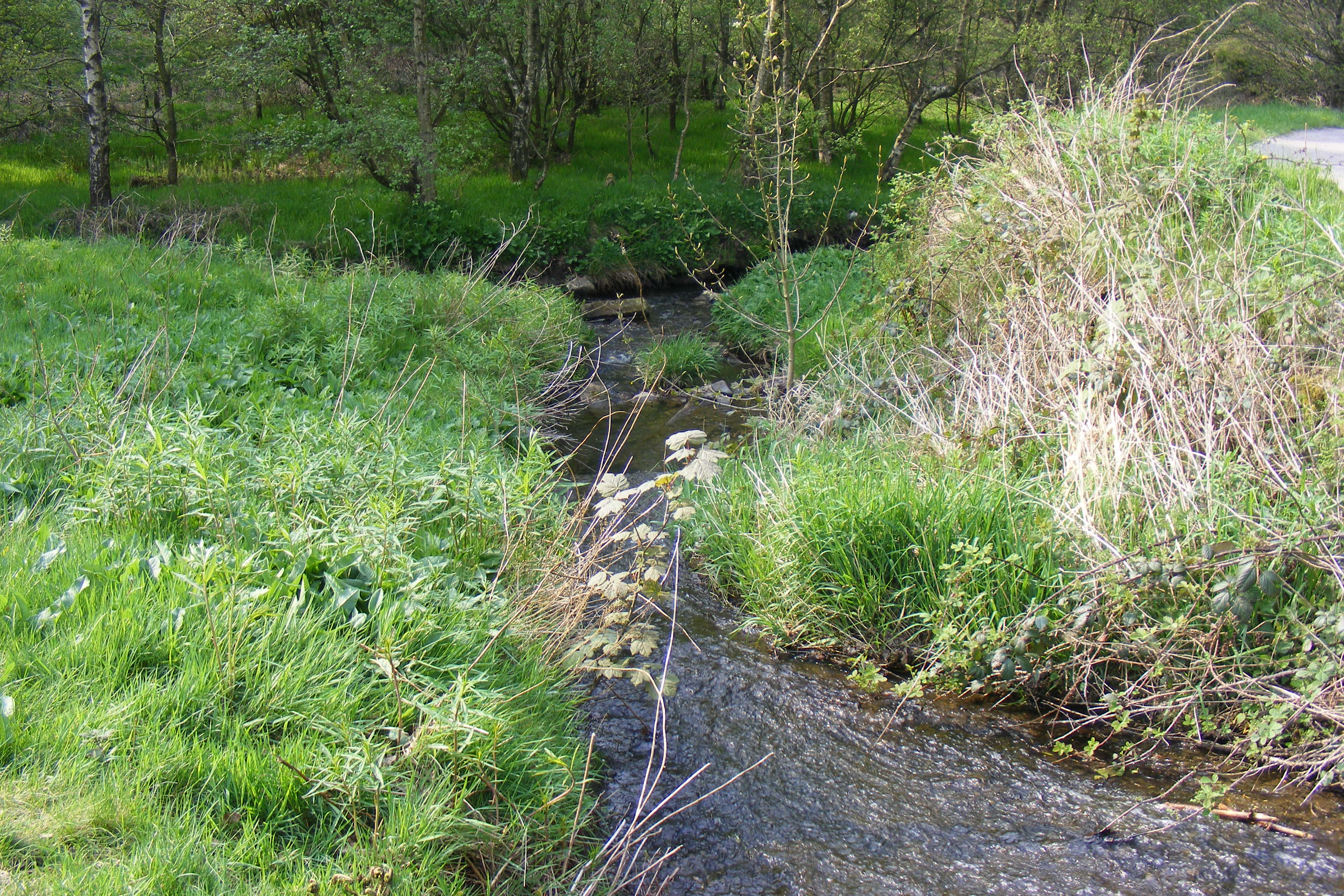

Location
- Country: England

Physical characteristics
- Source
  - location: Whittaker Moor
- Mouth
  - location: Ealees Brook
  - coordinates: 53°38′23.10″N 2°05′07.74″W

Shore Lane Brook is a water course in Greater Manchester and a tributary of Ealees Brook in Littleborough.
