= Smithy Bridge railway station =

Railway station in Greater Manchester, England

Coordinates: 53.6333°N 2.1134°W

Smithy Bridge
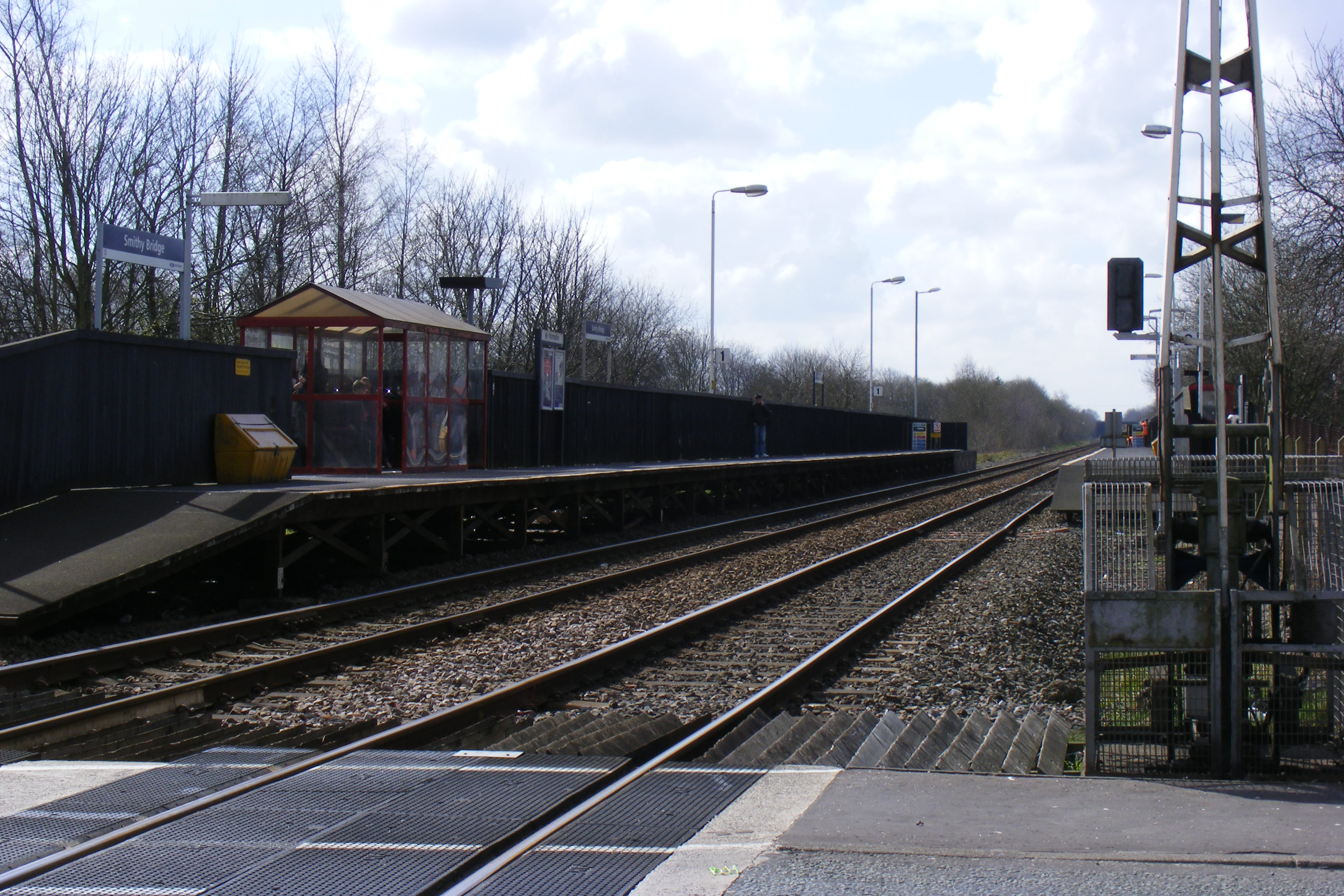
- Smithy Bridge railway station

General information
- Location: Smithy Bridge, Rochdale; England
- Grid reference: SD925151
- Managed by: Northern
- Platforms: 2

Other information
- Station code: SMB
- Classification: DfT category F1

Key dates
- 1868 1960 1985: Original station opened Closed; Current station opened

Passengers
- 2020/21: ▼50,430
- 2021/22: ▲0.124 million
- 2022/23: ▲0.140 million
- 2023/24: ▲0.173 million
- 2024/25: ▲0.191 million
Location
Notes
- Passenger statistics from the Office of Rail and Road

Smithy Bridge railway station serves the village of Smithy Bridge and Hollingworth Lake near Rochdale in Greater Manchester, England. The station is on the Caldervale Line 12 3/4 miles (20.5 km) north of Manchester Victoria on the way to Leeds.

== Facilities ==
The station is unstaffed, but there are ticket machines available to allow intending passengers to purchase or collect tickets prior to travelling. Both platforms have waiting shelters and step-free access.

== Services ==
There is a basic half-hourly service (with peak period extras) from the station to Manchester Victoria southbound and to Todmorden northbound on weekdays. From there, trains continue alternately to Blackburn via Burnley Manchester Road and to Leeds via Brighouse. Westbound services run beyond Manchester to Wigan Wallgate and Headbolt Lane.

In the early morning and evenings, trains to Leeds run via Halifax but on the same frequency, whilst on Sundays the service is hourly and provided by the Southport/Manchester to Blackburn trains.

Preceding station	National Rail	Following station
Rochdale	Northern; Caldervale Line	Littleborough

== History ==
The station was first opened by the Lancashire & Yorkshire Railway in October 1868. In 1915, the station was the scene of a tragic accident involving an express train and an empty stock train. Four people died and many others were injured. It was closed on 2 May 1960 by British Rail but reopened on its original site, albeit with a slightly different platform layout, on 19 August 1985 with financial assistance from Greater Manchester PTE. The signal box here, which controlled the level crossing and acted as a 'fringe' box to Preston PSB from 1973 onwards, was downgraded in late 2011 from a block post to a crossing box. The signalling is remotely operated from the new 'Rochdale West' panel at Castleton (which also supervises the layout at Rochdale and will eventually replace another box at Castleton East Junction) and the crossing is now automatic. Smithy Bridge Crossing box was closed early in 2014 and has since been demolished.
