= Hollingworth Lake =

Reservoir in Greater Manchester, England

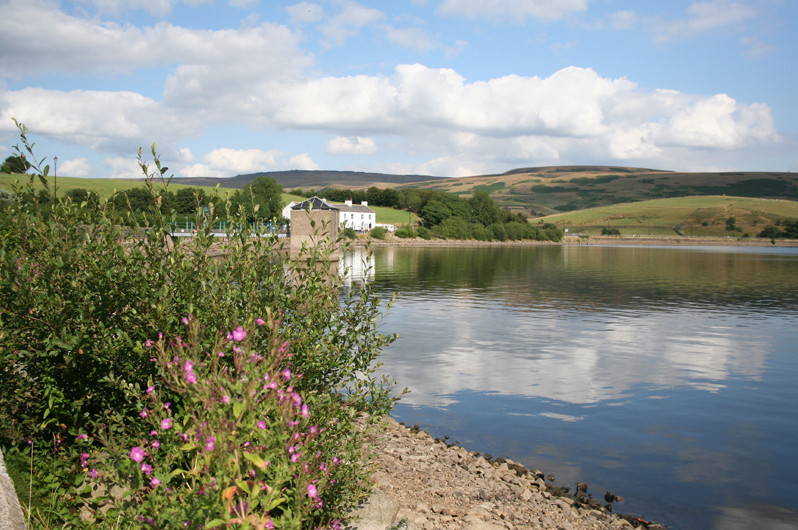
- The lake from the north shore

- Location within Greater Manchester Location within England
- Location: Littleborough, Greater Manchester
- Coordinates: 53°37′50″N 2°05′47″W
- Primary inflows: Longden End Brook
- Primary outflows: Hollingworth Brook
- Basin countries: England

Hollingworth Lake is a 130-acre (53 ha) reservoir at Smithy Bridge in Littleborough, Greater Manchester, England. It was originally built as the main water source for the Rochdale Canal, but developed as a tourist resort from the 1860s. Hotels were built around it, helped by the arrival of the railway in 1839, which brought day-trippers and weekend visitors from Manchester, Bradford and Leeds.

The popularity of the lake as a resort declined in the early twentieth century and the area was used as an army camp in the First World War. The canal company sold the reservoir to Oldham and Rochdale Corporations for water supply in 1923. After the Second World War, boating rights were bought by Rochdale Council, who developed the area into the Hollingworth Lake Country Park in 1974. There has been a steady increase in facilities since, and it is now a thriving centre for water sports and other activities.

Hollingworth Lake Rowing Club has been in continuous existence since 1872.

== History ==
The Rochdale Canal Act 1794 (34 Geo. 3. c. 78) sanctioned the construction of the Rochdale Canal. Hollingworth Lake with its three earth dams was a main feeder source completed in 1800, four years before the canal. The lake covers an area of 130 acres (53 ha) and the path around it originally measured 2.5 miles (4 km). In places the lake was 25 feet (7.6 m) deep, with the average depth being about 10 feet (3.0 m). When first constructed, it was capable of holding 400 million gallons (1,800 Ml) of water. The site was not an obvious choice for a reservoir as there was no natural hollow, and plans exist which indicate the reservoir could have been built in the Ealees Valley which had more suitable topography. Consequently, three large earth embankments were built to enclose the reservoir. The main embankment, Hollingworth Bank, is approximately 36 feet (11 m) high and about 220 yards (200 m) in length. Fens Bank is 30 feet (9 m) high and 220 yards (200 m) long while Shaw Moss Bank is 26 feet (8 m) high and 140 yards (130 m) long. The lake surface is about 557 feet (170 m) above sea level, A steam engine was installed to lift water 45 feet (14 m) into a 4-mile (6.4 km) channel which fed it into the summit pound at Chelburn. The pumping engine was demolished around 1910.

Local mill owners feared the canal would take water from the rivers and streams that powered their mills, and succeeded in defeating the first two attempts to obtain an act to authorise building the canal. The third attempt succeeded, largely because the canal company alleviated the millowners' concerns, and the act contained conditions on the siting of reservoirs, so they would not interfere with water supplies to the River Roch, River Irk or River Medlock. The reservoir was initially referred to as a Lodge because it was a water storage area. The name later changed to Hollingworth Lake.

The reservoir was initially called Hollingsworth Lodge, meaning water storage area, but later became known as Hollingworth Lake. When first built it was a benefit to the mill owners with works close to the canal and on the new low-level road from Todmorden to Littleborough. Houses were built for railway workers, reservoir workers, and workers in the new factories and cotton mills. The Lodge became known as The Lake, and became a popular place to walk.

Oldham and Rochdale Corporations Water Act 1923
- Act of Parliament
- Parliament of the United Kingdom
- Long title: An Act to transfer to the Corporations of Oldham and Rochdale as part of their water undertakings certain waterworks rights and powers of the Rochdale Canal Company to empower the said Corporations to construct new waterworks and for other purposes.
- Citation: 13 & 14 Geo. 5. c. lxxvii

Dates
- Royal assent: 31 July 1923

Text of statute as originally enacted

By the 1920s, the Rochdale Canal was in serious decline, and the Oldham and Rochdale Corporations Water Act 1923 (13 & 14 Geo. 5. c. lxxvii) authorised the sale of Hollingworth Lake and seven other reservoirs in the vicinity to the local authorities for use as a public water supply. The company received £396,667, from which it paid £98,334 to the Manchester Ship Canal Company in compensation for the loss of the water supplied by the Rochdale company, who retained the water rights to certain local streams, and could draw on the reservoirs under certain exceptional circumstances.

A major programme of civil engineering work to strengthen and reshape the earth dams was carried out in 1985. The outlet from the reservoir was rebuilt, and the level of the overflow was reduced. The work cost £2.5 million, and resulted in the lake being closed for leisure activities for almost a year. A ten-year statutory inspection of the reservoir in 2011 identified the need to improve the outflow arrangement so that water levels could be lowered more quickly in an emergency or after heavy rainfall. The £1.25 million project included a 9-foot (2.7 m) concrete tower, with equipment on top raising its height by 9 feet (2.7 m) but concerns expressed by the Friends of Hollingworth Lake and local councillors resulted in a tower half the height of the original design and clad in stone to fit in with the surroundings. The four-month project began in autumn 2011 and the water level was reduced by 6.6 feet (2.0 m) while the work was in progress, but the lake remained open for watersports.

United Utilities is responsible for the maintenance of the reservoir whose main function is to supply water to the Rochdale Canal and has never been used to provide drinking water for the public supply network.

During 2020 a debris barrier was installed by United Utilities to prevent potential blockage of the overflow. There are regular inspections carried out due to the construction of the dams which mirror those of located at Whaley Bridge,

== Tourist resort ==
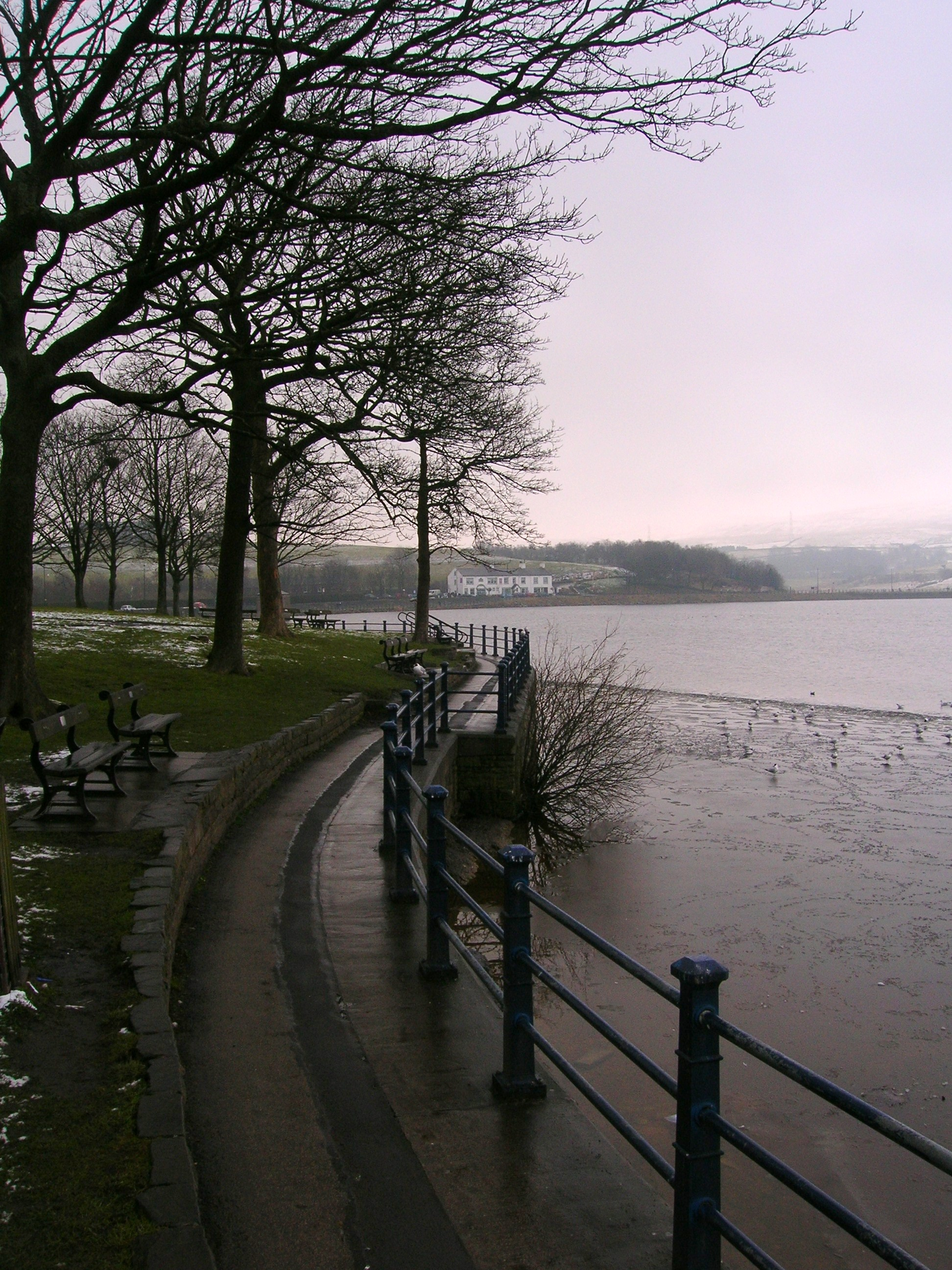
The Promenade at Hollingworth Lake

The area developed rapidly after the arrival of the Manchester and Leeds Railway in 1839, and the construction of Summit Tunnel in 1841, the longest railway tunnel in Europe at that time. In the 1850s, Henry Newall of Harehill, owner of Harehill Woollen Mill and a recently built gasworks, and his engineer, Mr. Sladen, later the landlord of the Mermaid Inn, saw the potential of the lake as a tourist attraction. They leased the lake from the canal company and created novelty amusements and facilities for boating. Despite very cold water and strong undercurrents caused by water entering and leaving the lake, small rowing boats became popular, and two paddle steamers were operated from 1856. By 1860, there was a rowing club, and a regatta was held in 1862. Two hotels, the Beach Hotel and the Lake Hotel and Gardens, catered for day trippers and weekend visitors. The facilities were advertised by the railway companies, who transported visitors to Smithybridge and Littleborough stations, for the short walk to the lake and its facilities.

The resort became known as the Weighver's Seaport, and Davenport's "Guide to Hollingworth Lake", published from 1860 onwards, extolled its virtues in typical Victorian fashion.

.. As you step on the embankment, which is considerable and scarcely looks artificial, the broad expanse of water at once presents itself to your vision. Your first feeling on beholding it is that of astonishment that so vast a basin, lying in that cup of hills, should not have become known to you before. ... You will see Blackstone Edge to the east, towering above its fellows, and preaching from its rocky pulpit sermons to the solitude around.

There were two hotels in the area before the reservoir was built, the Fisherman's Inn, developed from farm buildings at Littleborough, and the Blue Ball at Smithy Bridge, which was demolished and rebuilt in the 1970s. The Beach Hotel built at the start of development had accommodation and refreshment rooms, as well as outdoor platforms illuminated by gaslight which were used for picnic parties and dancing. The Lake Hotel and Pleasure Grounds, to which visitors could walk, travel by carriage around the eastern shore, or cross the lake by steamer, was built in the Swiss style on the opposite side of the lake. The company maintained a booking office at the ferry terminal which was connected to the hotel by a "Subaqueous Telegraph cable", laid on the lake bed. Its grounds were designed by Mr Henderson of Birkenhead, and had a bowling green, a croquet lawn, shrubberies and rustic arbours. Refreshments were served in a small building by the water's edge built for the boat club in 1860. Only the foundations of the hotel remain.

The Mermaid Inn had a 1777 date stone but this was not thought to be original. It closed in 1911. The Lodge Inn at Rakewood provided accommodation and food, and stabling for horses, as did the other hotels. It opened in 1826 and closed in 1917, and became two houses. Peanock Farm, on the south side of the lake, was rebuilt as the Queens Hotel in 1857, and had "a spacious pavilion and dancing stage in the grounds." It has reverted to being a farm. The Lancashire and Yorkshire Hotel, built in 1876, had an outdoor dancing platform covering 18,360 square feet (1,706 m^{2}). When it was demolished, the stone was reused to construct several houses. Now a private house, the Star Inn was in Littleborough near the Fishermans Inn and close to both stations were hotels called the Railway. Smithy Bridge had a beer house called the Royal Oak, and there were unlicensed refreshment rooms around the lake. Many private houses supplied "tea in jugs and sandwiches". The resort catered for 6,000 miners, who arrived at the lake on 13 August 1866 for a conference.

In November 1865, Mr Newhall was notified of "the immoralities which it is stated take place in connection with the dancing stages at Hollingworth." Two months later he replied that if such immoralities were taking place, they were certainly not doing so on any part of the reservoir or land which he was leasing from the canal company.

At the height of its popularity in the late 19th century, there were three lake steamers, and visitors arrived by trains from Manchester, Leeds and Bradford. The rowing club folded after a few years, and the clubhouse was used by the Lake Hotel for refreshments but the club reformed in 1872 and is still active. Fishing developed after 30,000 fish, mostly bream, dace and perch were introduced in 1863. A variety of stalls and lock-up shops, many close to the landing stage for the ferry, were soon trading in sweets, snacks and souvenirs, and on special holidays, there were fortune tellers, conjurers and tricksters. Although photography was in its infancy there were six businesses listed in Davenport's Guide as taking photographic portraits of visitors. Other attractions included a camera obscura, a stereoscopic exhibition, and a gymnasium, which was attached to the Beach Hotel. A roundabout with galloping horses, powered successively by a hand winch, a steam engine, a gas engine and finally electricity, remained at the lake until after the Second World War.

The lake's surface froze to a sufficient thickness to allow activities on the ice in 1860 and 1864, when over 2,000 people were recorded as skating. Teams from Leeds, Liverpool and Manchester used the lake for curling matches, and local teams even played cricket. Cricket was played in 1871, and in the 20th century the lake froze in 1902, 1907, 1924, 1929, 1941 and 1947. The lake almost dried up in 1934, when the water level dropped so low that stone farm buildings which had not been seen since 1800 became visible.

The fortunes of the resort improved in 1883, after a law was passed allowing boats to operate on Sundays. Huge crowds flocked to the lake, although a claim of 40,000 visitors on one occasion may be an exaggeration. Swimming became popular, despite the cold water, perhaps inspired by Captain Matthew Webb, who used the lake for training before becoming the first man to swim the English Channel from Dover to Calais in 1875. He competed against G A Jennings of Tunbridge Wells in a 5-hour endurance swim in 1881. Regular swimming competitions were held from 1882, including the mile championship. The distance was covered in 26 minutes 8 seconds by a local man named Joseph Nuttall when he swam against McCusker from the United States, in the "World Professional Mile Championship", allegedly watched by a crowd of 20,000.

=== Decline ===
By the beginning of the 20th century, travel was easier, people took longer holidays, and the lake's attraction started to diminish. Some hotels closed and the Beach Hotel burned down in 1901 although it was rebuilt. The stunts and shows stopped and by the start of the First World War the lake was in decline. There was an upsurge in activity when a training camp for the Manchester Regiment was set up in the Ealees Valley and the hotels and local houses accommodated wives and visitors. Most soldiers from the camp were sent to the Dardanelles, but few returned as many were killed on the beaches when they tried to land. After that war, the rowing club developed and the lake was used for sailing. Day visitors could hire rowing or motor boats, but only the Fisherman's Inn and the Beach Hotel remained open.

=== Revival ===
In 1950, the boating rights which had been held by the Water Board since 1923 were taken over by Rochdale Council, who also planned to turn the area into a country park in 1974. Ten years later, it was in a list of the top ten country parks in England. It is now used for recreation and includes a wildlife sanctuary. Currently there are two public houses by the lake, the Beach Hotel and the Wine Press, which was formerly the Fisherman's Inn.

== Activities ==
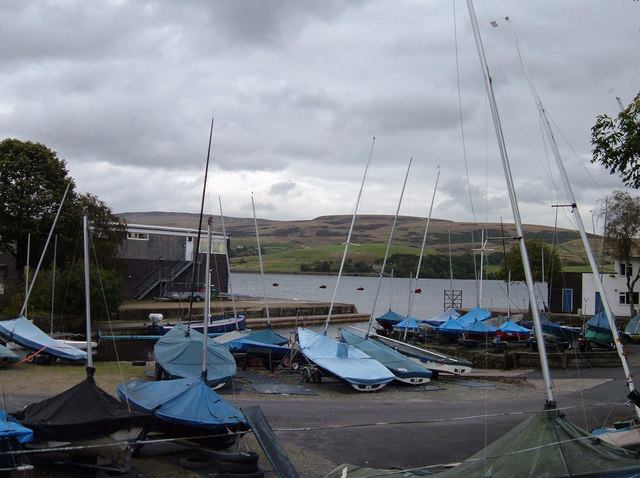
Hollingworth Lake boatyard

The lake supports watersports like sailing, windsurfing, canoeing, swimming, rafting, rowing and fishing. Since 1989, Hollingworth Lake Water Activity Centre has offered tuition in outdoor activities, including kayaking, canoeing, power boating and sailing. In summer, visitors can hire rowing boats. The centre used to operate a 34-foot (10 m) launch The Lady Alice at weekends during the summer months to provide trips around the lake, but the boat has been out of service since 2009 as the local authority would could not justify the investment in retaining the vessel in a fit state. A new pleasure boat, The Lady Katherine was launched in May 2019. But to date it has not fulfilled the role intended partly due to COVID but also due to the lack of opportunities to use implemented by Link 4 Life.

The scenic walk, 2.5 miles (4.0 km) around the lake, passes a nature reserve with a bird hide in the south-western corner of the lake, in an area from which boats and watersports are excluded. The lake provides habitat for a variety of wildlife and is used for fishing. The variety of fish has been expanded by stocking the lake with carp, tench and roach, in addition to those introduced in 1863. The country park is used for activities for children, who catch various types of pond life. The path around the lake is a gravel track from the Beach Hotel to the far side of the Lake, and then follows Rakewood Road and Hollingworth Road. A children's playground and trim trail for adults known as the Woodland Enviro Gym situated where the path joins Rakewood Road, was opened on 7 August 2010. The facility was funded by the Big Lottery Community Spaces fund, and was the idea of the Friends of Hollingworth Lake, a group working to improve the facilities, which was set up as an informal society in November 2007, but was registered as a private company limited by guarantee in May 2010 to enable it to handle grant applications.

Lake users have included:

- Hollingworth Lake Rowing Club, whose yearly regatta has attracted many other clubs since it was first held in 1964. The club was re-formed in 1872 after its initial demise.
- Hollingworth Lake Sailing Club, which was founded in 1946, offers open handicap racing and social sailing in a variety of different class of dinghy sailing.
- The Sea Cadets training centre "T.S. Palatine", located on the south side of the lake, was opened on 16 May 1960 by Lord Derby, and offered training in rowing, sculling and seamanship. Despite providing training for around 1,500 young people each year, the Sea Cadets took the decision to close the centre from 30 April 2011, as the organisation would be better served in the north west of England by the new Crosby Lakeside Adventure Centre.

To the east, a visitor centre shows children's artwork and objects found in the lake. The annual Easter fun fair runs from the Thursday before Easter until the following Sunday, on a car park by the lake.

As of 2020 Rochdale MBC/Link4life had agreed to the redevelopment of the visitor centre with the property being transferred to the RSPCA. This effect of the sale would involve the existing visitors centre being redeveloped to remove the current facilities available with the addition of smaller cafeteria area accessible to the general public.

== Transport ==
The lake and its surroundings are served by the Smithy Bridge and Littleborough railway stations, which link west to Rochdale, Oldham and Manchester, and east to West Yorkshire. Smithy Bridge station stands beside a barrier-operated level crossing.

Hollingworth Lake is served by buses from Rochdale including the 455 (Rochdale, Smallbridge, Hollingworth Lake and Littleborough), and the 456 (Rochdale, Wardle and Hollingworth Lake).

It is easily accessible by road from junction 21 of the M62 motorway (via the A640 and B6225 roads) and has three pay and display car parks.

== Bibliography ==
- Colligan, A. W. (1977). The Weighver's Seaport - The story of Hollingworth Lake. G Kelsall. ISBN 0-9505577-0-6.
- Hadfield, Charles; Biddle, Gordon (1970). The Canals of North West England, Vol 2 (pp.241-496). David and Charles. ISBN 0-7153-4992-9.
