= Calderbrook =

Village in Greater Manchester, England

Coordinates: 53.660°N 2.086°W

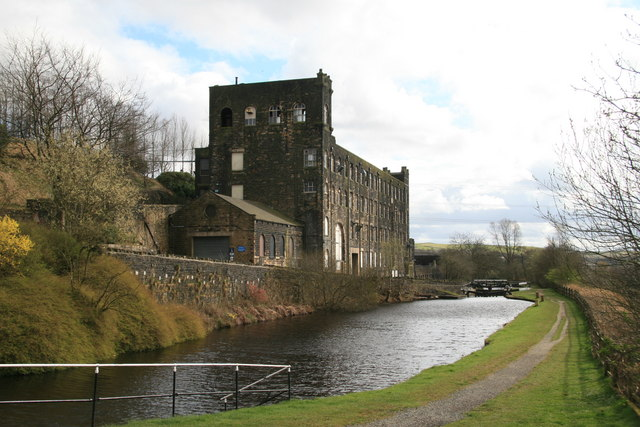
- Rock Nook Mill on the banks of the Rochdale Canal

- Location within Greater Manchester
- OS grid reference: SD943181
- Metropolitan borough: Rochdale
- Metropolitan county: Greater Manchester
- Region: North West
- Country: England
- Sovereign state: United Kingdom
- Post town: ROCHDALE
- Postcode district: OL15
- Dialling code: 01706
- Police: Greater Manchester
- Fire: Greater Manchester
- Ambulance: North West
- UK Parliament: Rochdale

Calderbrook (/ˈkɔːldərbrʊk/ KAWL-dər-bruuk) is a village within the Metropolitan Borough of Rochdale, in Greater Manchester, England.

It was originally part of the township of Blatchinworth and Calderbrook within the ancient parish of Rochdale, becoming a separate civil parish in 1866. The civil parish was abolished in 1894, when it became part of Littleborough urban district.

== See also ==
- Listed buildings in Littleborough, Greater Manchester
