= Smithy Bridge =

Coordinates: 53.632°N 2.109°W

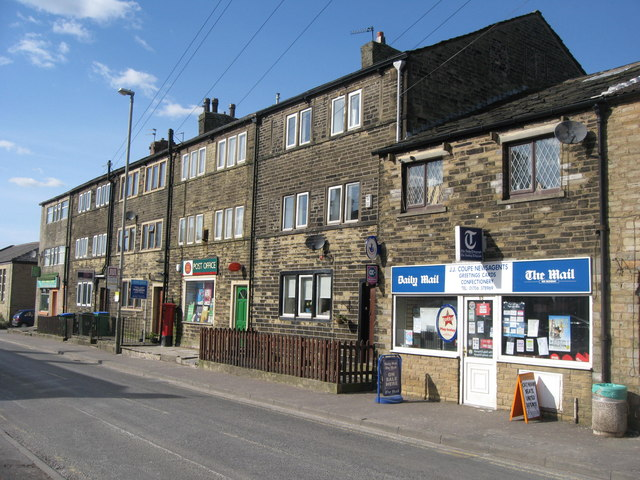
- Smithy Bridge

- Location within Greater Manchester
- OS grid reference: SD927150
- Metropolitan borough: Rochdale
- Metropolitan county: Greater Manchester
- Region: North West
- Country: England
- Sovereign state: United Kingdom
- Post town: LITTLEBOROUGH
- Postcode district: OL15
- Dialling code: 01706
- Police: Greater Manchester
- Fire: Greater Manchester
- Ambulance: North West
- UK Parliament: Rochdale

Smithy Bridge is a suburb of Littleborough in the Metropolitan Borough of Rochdale, Greater Manchester, England. Hollingworth Lake Country Park is close by. It also has a link to the Rochdale Canal and has its own railway station. It was once a route on the packhorse trip through to Yorkshire.

Smithy Bridge was formerly a part of Butterworth.

== See also ==
- Listed buildings in Littleborough, Greater Manchester
