= Longden End Brook =

River in Greater Manchester, England

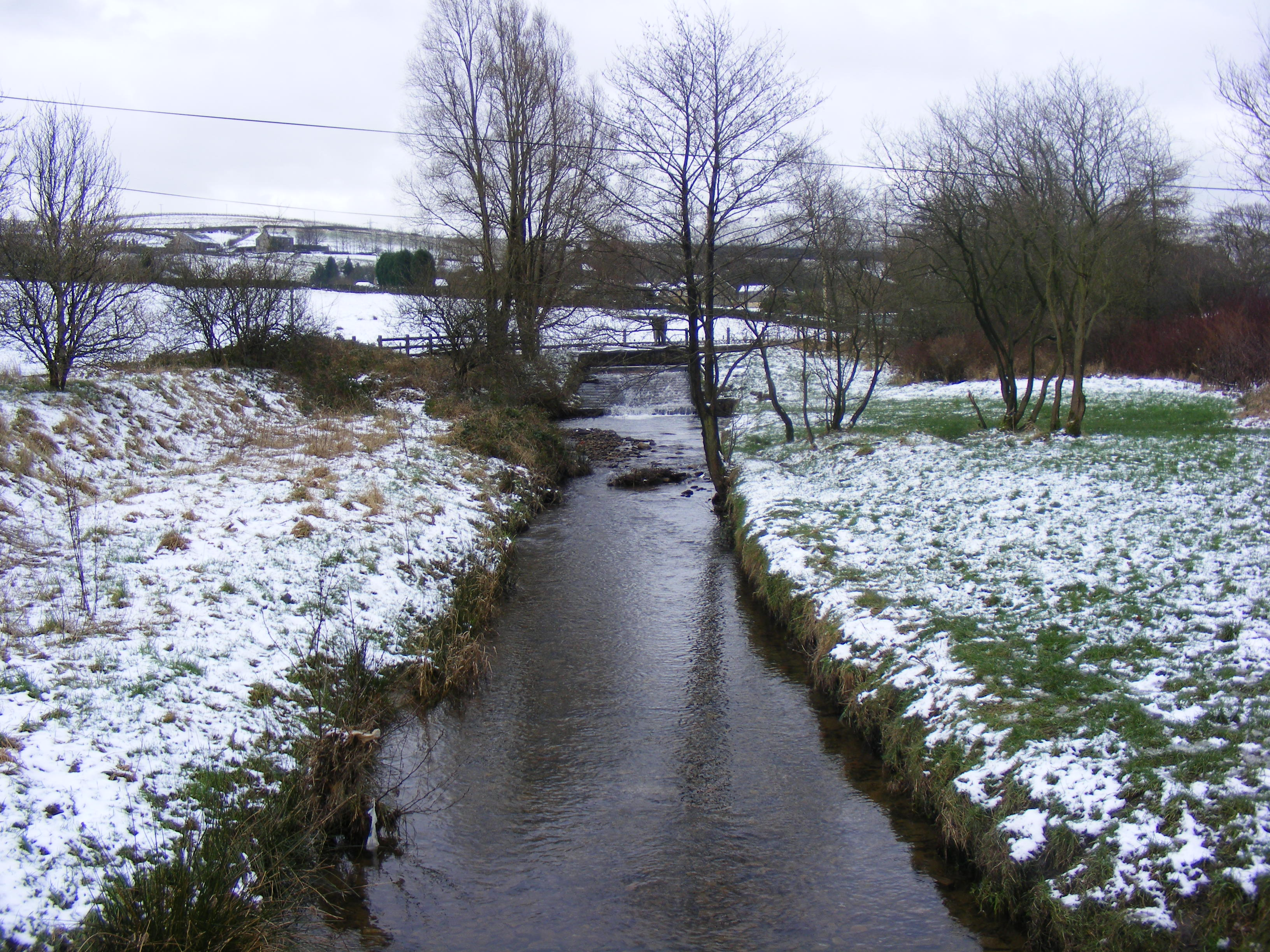
- Weir near Hollingworth Lake

Location
- Country: England

Physical characteristics
- Source
  - location: Blackstone Edge
- Mouth
  - location: Hollingworth Lake
  - coordinates: 53°37′43.81″N 2°05′26.77″W

Longden End Brook is a watercourse in Greater Manchester. It rises near Windy Hill, and flows down Rakewood Valley and underneath the M62 motorway at Rakewood Viaduct, before arriving at Hollingworth Lake, where it is the main feeder stream. Historically, the watercourse was used to power three watermills along its length.

== Tributaries ==
- Lower Whiteley Dean Brook
- Castle Shore Brook
- Moss Slack Brook
- White Isles Brook
