= Littleborough, Greater Manchester =

Town in Rochdale, England

Littleborough
- Town
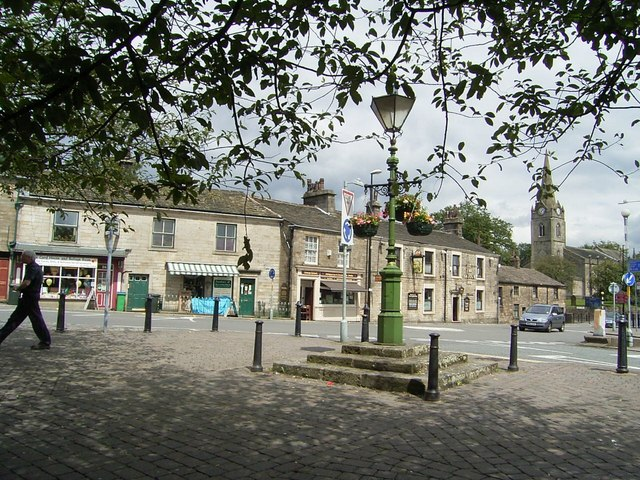
- Church Street, in Littleborough town centre, 2007

- Location within Greater Manchester
- Population: 13,807
- OS grid reference: SD9316
  - London: 170 mi (270 km) SSE
- Metropolitan borough: Rochdale
- Metropolitan county: Greater Manchester
- Region: North West
- Country: England
- Sovereign state: United Kingdom
- Post town: LITTLEBOROUGH
- Postcode district: OL15
- Dialling code: 01706
- Police: Greater Manchester
- Fire: Greater Manchester
- Ambulance: North West
- UK Parliament: Rochdale

Littleborough (/ˈlɪtəlbərə/ LIT-əl-bər-ə) is a town in the Metropolitan Borough of Rochdale, Greater Manchester, England, in the upper Roch Valley by the foothills of the South Pennines, 3 miles (4.8 km) northeast of Rochdale and 13 miles (20.9 km) northeast of Manchester; Milnrow and the M62 motorway are to the south, and the rural uplands of Blackstone Edge to the east. According to the 2001 census, Littleborough, and its suburbs of Calderbrook, Shore and Smithy Bridge, had a population of 13,807.

Within the boundaries of the historic county of Lancashire, Littleborough and its surroundings have provided evidence of Neolithic, Celtic, Roman and Anglo-Saxon activity in the area. During the Middle Ages, Littleborough was a hamlet in the manor of Hundersfield, parish of Rochdale and part of the Salford Hundred. It was focused upon the junction of two ancient routes over the Pennines – one of which may have been a Roman road — that joined to cross the River Roch. By 1472, Littleborough consisted of a chapel, a cluster of cottages, and an inn, and its inhabitants were broadly farmers who were spurred to weave wool by merchants who passed between the markets at Rochdale and Halifax. When cotton was introduced as a base to make textiles, Littleborough experienced an influx of families, mostly from the neighbouring West Riding of Yorkshire. Affluent homes and estates were established on Littleborough's fringes.

In the late 18th century, the low-altitude Summit Gap between Littleborough and Walsden was approved as the best route over the Pennines for the Rochdale Canal and the Manchester to Leeds railway; Hollingworth Lake was built at Littleborough's south side as a feeder reservoir to regulate the waters of the canal. This infrastructure encouraged industrialists to modify Littleborough's traditional handloom cloth workshops with a mechanised form of textile production. Attracted to the area's natural resources and modern infrastructure, coal mining, engineering ventures and increasingly large textile mills contributed to Littleborough's population growth and urbanisation, sealing its status as a mill town. Local government reforms established the Littleborough Urban District in 1894 which was governed by its own district council until its abolition in 1974.

By the mid-20th century, imports of cheaper foreign goods prompted the gradual deindustrialisation of Littleborough, but its commercial diversity allowed it to repel the ensuing economic depression experienced elsewhere in North West England. Subsumed into the Metropolitan Borough of Rochdale in 1974, Littleborough endures as a commuter town with a distinct community; its Civic Trust works to preserve and enhance its historic character, and societies exist to use the surrounding countryside for water-skiing, horse riding and other recreational activities. Littleborough's stone-built town centre is designated as a Conservation Area for its special architectural qualities.

== History ==
Evidence of human activity in the area, dating to at least the Neolithic period, exists in the form of ancient flint tool and arrowhead discoveries. Rochdale Museum hold an early Iron Age bracelet made of a shale from Kimmeridge in Dorset, which was found in 1929 on Flint Hill, east of Blackstone Edge. A torc (or necklet) with ornamentation of a late-Celtic design was found in the Mawrode area of Littleborough in 1832; and the name Calderbrook is derived from an ancient Celtic language, two factors implying inhabitation by Celtic Britons.

Littleborough is supposed to have been the site of a small station along the Roman road that is routed from Mamucium (Manchester) to Eboracum (York) which skirts the town. Evidence of Roman occupation in Littleborough comes from finds of coins and pottery, and the right arm of a silver statue of Victory. Following the end of Roman rule in Britain, the remaining population came under the influence of the Anglo-Saxons. Place names indicate the Anglo-Saxon settlement of the Littleborough area, for example the 'gate' element in Lydgate and Reddyshore Scout Gate is Old English for 'road'. The name Littleborough is itself derived from the Old English lȳtel bruh (meaning small fortified place) or else lȳtel bróc (meaning small watercourse).

In 1848 the population was chiefly employed in three flannel-mills, four cotton-factories, in bleachworks, six coal-pits, a stone-quarry and in brick-making.

== Governance ==
Lying within the historic county boundaries of Lancashire since the early 12th century, Littleborough was a chapelry and component area of Hundersfield, an ancient township within the parish of Rochdale and Salford Hundred. Hundersfield later constituted a civil parish encompassing several settlements to the northeast of Rochdale, until its dissolution.

Littleborough's first local authority was a local board of health established in 1870; Littlborough Local Board of Health was a regulatory body responsible for standards of hygiene and sanitation for parts of the then townships of Blatchinworth and Calderbrook, of Wuerdle and Wardle and of Butterworth, with the local board's territory being expanded into further parts of these townships in 1879. Under the Local Government Act 1894, the area of the local board expanded to encompass all of Blatchinworth and Calderbrook and became the Littleborough Urban District, a local government district in the Rochdale Poor Law Union and administrative county of Lancashire. Under the Local Government Act 1972, the Littleborough Urban District was abolished, and Littleborough and its outlying settlements have, since 1 April 1974, formed an unparished area of the Metropolitan Borough of Rochdale, within the metropolitan county of Greater Manchester. In anticipation of the new local government arrangement, Littleborough Urban District Council applied for civil parish status to be granted to the locality after 1974, however the application was not successful. The Littleborough Neighbourhood Forum is now forming as a result of the Localism Act 2011.

== Geography ==
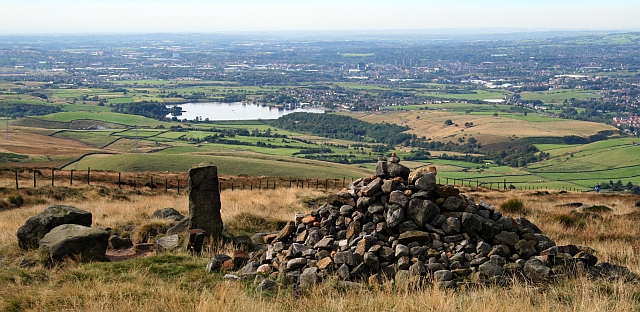
A view towards Littleborough and Rochdale from Blackstone Edge, 2007

At 53°38′38″N 2°5′53″W (53.644°, −2.098°), and 170 miles (274 km) north-northwest of central London, Littleborough stands roughly 623 feet (190 m) above sea level, on the western slopes of the Pennines, 13 miles (20.9 km) north-northeast of Manchester city centre, in the valley of the River Roch. Blackstone Edge and West Yorkshire are to the east; Rochdale and Milnrow are to the southwest and south.

In Littleborough are the localities and suburbs of Calderbrook, Chelburn, Durn, Featherstall, Gale, Hollinworth, Laneside, Rake, Shore, Sladen, Smithy Bridge, Stansfield, Summit and Whitelees.

== Transport ==
Littleborough is served by the town's two railway stations, Littleborough itself and at Smithy Bridge. The town is situated on the A58 between Rochdale and Halifax and is the starting point of the A6033 which runs northwards up to Todmorden. The town is also well provided with buses which connect all districts in the Rochdale area and into the Pennine towns as far as Halifax.

== Media ==
Local news and television programmes are provided by BBC North West and ITV Granada. Television signals are received from the Winter Hill and local relay TV transmitters.

Local radio stations are BBC Radio Manchester, Heart North West, Smooth North West, Hits Radio Manchester, Greatest Hits Radio Manchester & The North West, Capital Manchester and Lancashire and Rochdale Valley, a community based radio station.

The town is served by the local newspaper, the Rochdale Observer and the regional publication which it is part of, the Manchester Evening News.

== Notable people ==
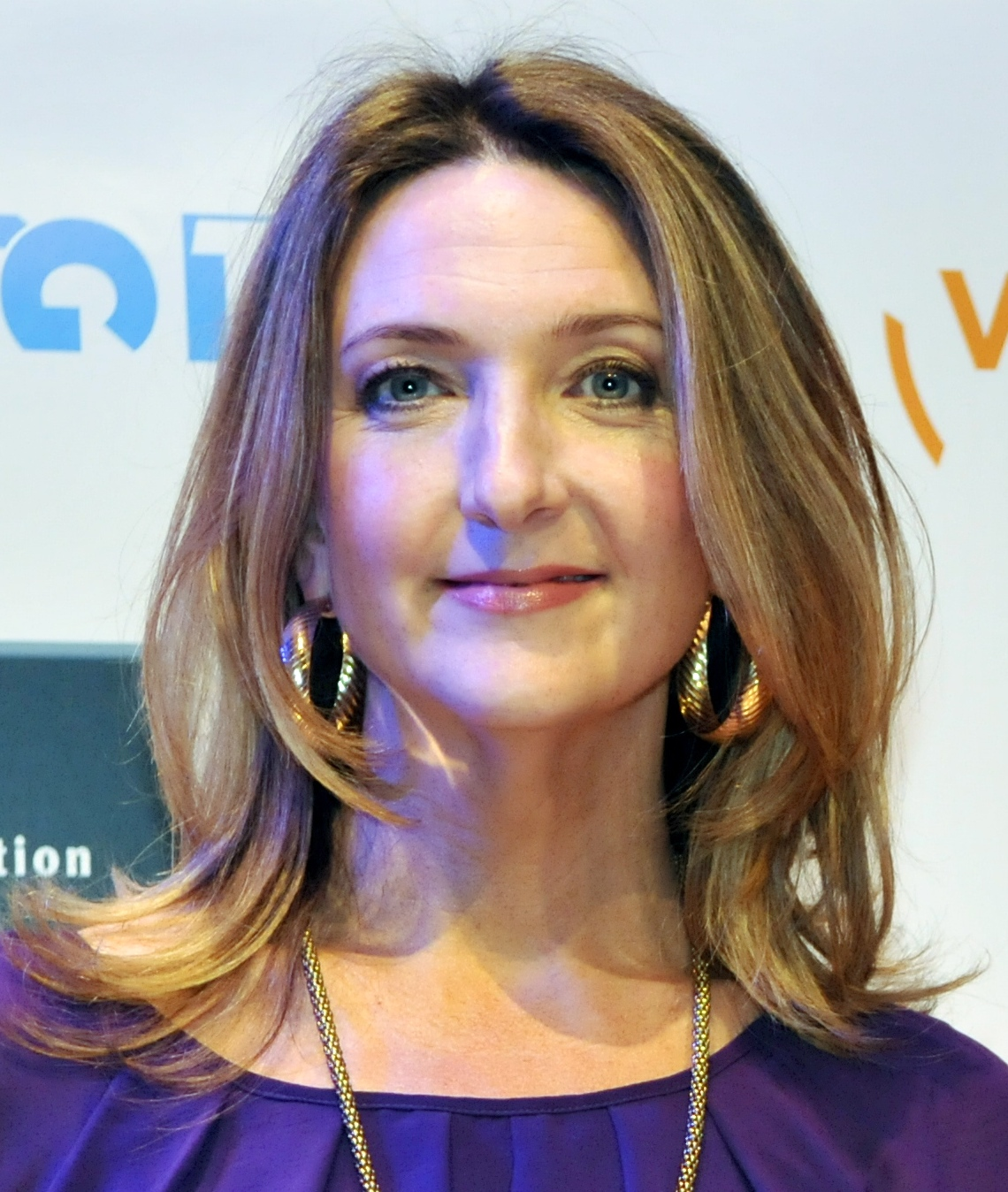
Victoria Derbyshire, 2011

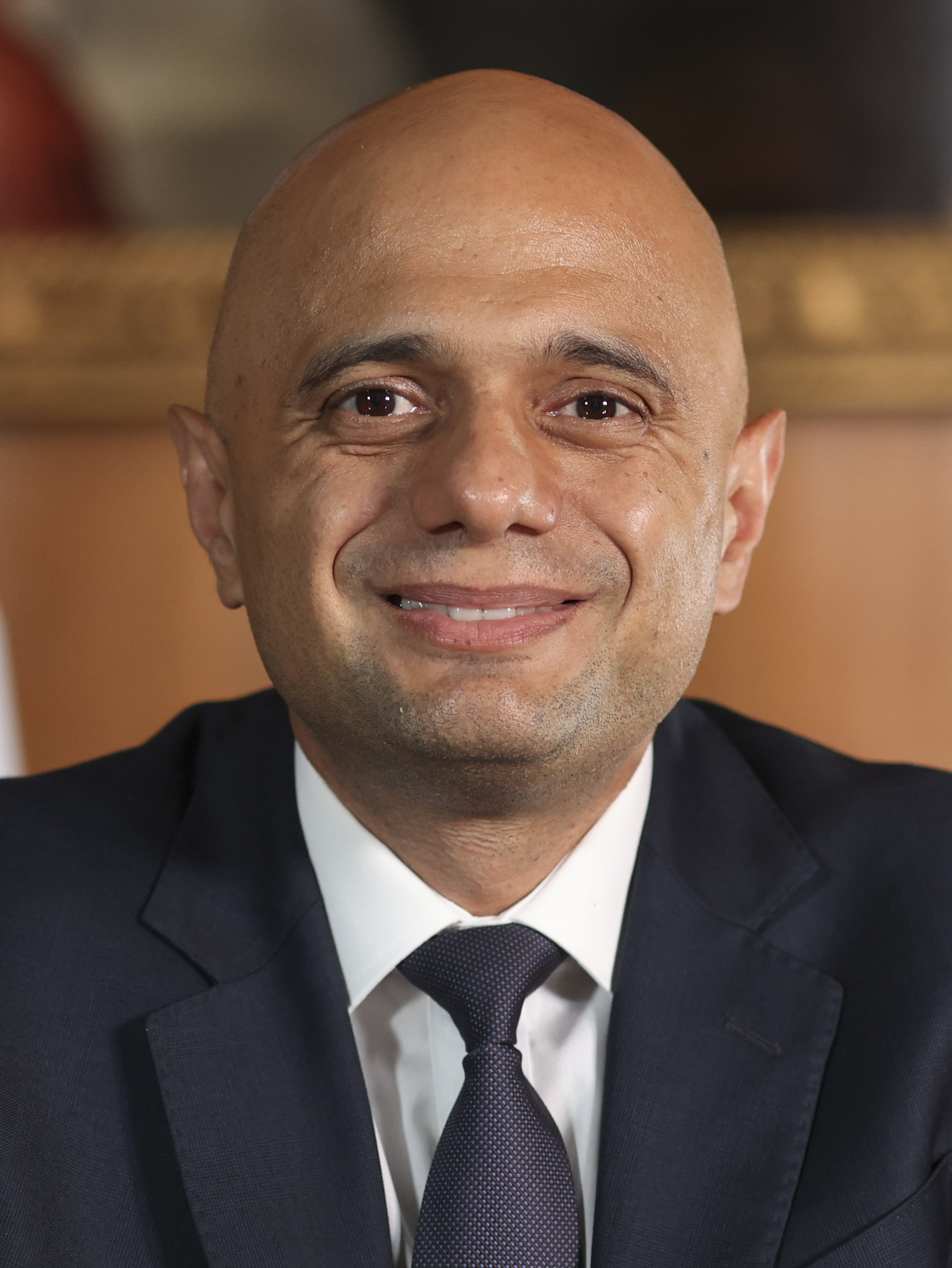
Sajid Javid, 2021

- Kenneth Howorth (1932–1981), a British army officer and explosives officer, awarded the George Medal for gallantry in 1983.
- Patricia Baird (born 1937), British medical geneticist active in Canada.
- Graham Clark (1941–2023), English operatic tenor
- Air Chief Marshal Sir Malcolm Pledger (born 1948), a retired Royal Air Force officer.
- Andy (born 1959), and Liz Kershaw (born 30 July 1958), radio broadcasters, both born locally.
- Lorna Fitzsimons (born 1967), businesswoman and former politician, MP for Rochdale from 1997 to 2005.
- Victoria Derbyshire (born 1968), journalist, newsreader and broadcaster, grew up locally for a while
- Sir Sajid Javid (born 1969), former politician and minister, MP for Bromsgrove 2010 to 2024.
- Agyness Deyn (born 1983), model and actress, born locally.
- Emma Edmondson (born 1984), TV actress, played Mel Morton in Coronation Street.

=== Sport ===
- Queenie Newall (1854–1929), an English archer who won the gold medal at the 1908 Summer Olympics
- Lees Radcliffe (1865–1928) cricketer, played 50 First-class cricket games
- Bill Williams (born 1960), footballer who played 356 games ending with 156 for Stockport County
- Iain Hesford (1960–2014), footballer goalkeeper who played 448 games beginning with 202 for Blackpool
- Dexter Fitton (born 1965), former cricketer, played 52 First-class cricket games
- Matt Calland (born 1971), International Rugby League player, played 228 games, head coach for Rochdale Hornets 2019–22.
- Chris Lucketti (born 1971), footballer who played 613 games including 235 for Bury & 189 for Preston North End
- Richard Maden (born 1972), breaststroke swimmer, team silver medallist at the 1998 Commonwealth Games

== See also ==
- Listed buildings in Littleborough, Greater Manchester
