= Elizabeth Cochran =

Seismologist

- Education: University of California, Los Angeles
- Scientific career
- Thesis: Earthquake rupture initiation and fault structure : I. triggering of earthquakes by Earth tides : II. seismic anisotrophy near the Hector Mine rupture : III. post-seismic displacements observed with InSAR (2005)

Elizabeth Scott Cochran is a seismologist known for her work on early warning systems for earthquakes and human-induced earthquakes.

== Education and career ==
As a middle-school student living in California, Cochran experienced the 1989 Loma Prieta earthquake. Cochran has a B.S. in geophysics from the University of California, Santa Barbara (2000) and went on to earn an M.Sc.(2003) and a Ph.D. (2005) in geophysics and space physics from the University of California. Following her Ph.D., Cochran was a postdoctoral investigator at the University of California, San Diego. From 2007 until 2011, Cochran was an assistant professor at the University of California, Riverside, until she joined the United States Geological Survey.

== Research ==
Cochran's early research was on the impact of the 1999 Hector Mine earthquake. Her subsequent work examined the geographic extent of earthquake damage, and defined the factors that lead to the 2011 Oklahoma earthquake. In 2006, Cochran co-foundered of Quake-Catcher Network, a crowd-sourced program that detects earthquakes. Quake-Catcher Network was able to track the 2008 Reno earthquakes. The original idea was to use laptops to track earthquakes, but as the project evolved it outfitted citizen scientists with seismometers, which are used to detect earthquakes. Later, Cochran was the lead scientist for ShakeAlert, an early warning system for earthquakes in the western United States.

== Awards and honors ==
In 2006, Cochran received the Doris M. Curtis Outstanding Woman in Science Award from the Geological Society of America. In 2010, Cochran received a Presidential Early Career Award for Scientists and Engineers, which is an honor given to early career scientists in the United States. In 2025, Cochran received the Joanne Simpson Medal from the American Geophysical Union.

== Selected publications ==
- Keranen, Katie M.; Savage, Heather M.; Abers, Geoffrey A.; Cochran, Elizabeth S. (2013-06-01). "Potentially induced earthquakes in Oklahoma, USA: Links between wastewater injection and the 2011 Mw 5.7 earthquake sequence". Geology. 41 (6): 699–702. Bibcode:2013Geo....41..699K. doi:10.1130/G34045.1. ISSN 0091-7613.
- Cochran, Elizabeth S.; Vidale, John E.; Tanaka, Sachiko (2004-11-12). "Earth Tides Can Trigger Shallow Thrust Fault Earthquakes". Science. 306 (5699): 1164–1166. Bibcode:2004Sci...306.1164C. doi:10.1126/science.1103961. ISSN 0036-8075. PMID 15498971. S2CID 45644672.
- Keranen, Katie M.; Savage, Heather M.; Abers, Geoffrey A.; Cochran, Elizabeth S. (2013). "Potentially induced earthquakes in Oklahoma, USA: Links between wastewater injection and the 2011 Mw 5.7 earthquake sequence". Geology. 41 (6): 699–702. Bibcode:2013Geo....41..699K. doi:10.1130/G34045.1. ISSN 1943-2682.
- Cochran, Elizabeth S.; Lawrence, Jesse F.; Christensen, Carl; Jakka, Ravi S. (2009-01-01). "The Quake-Catcher Network: Citizen Science Expanding Seismic Horizons". Seismological Research Letters. 80 (1): 26–30. Bibcode:2009SeiRL..80...26C. doi:10.1785/gssrl.80.1.26. ISSN 0895-0695.
- Cochran, Elizabeth S.; Li, Yong-Gang; Shearer, Peter M.; Barbot, Sylvain; Fialko, Yuri; Vidale, John E. (2009-04-01). "Seismic and geodetic evidence for extensive, long-lived fault damage zones". Geology. 37 (4): 315–318. Bibcode:2009Geo....37..315C. doi:10.1130/G25306A.1. ISSN 0091-7613.
