= John Milne =

British geologist and mining engineer (1850–1913)

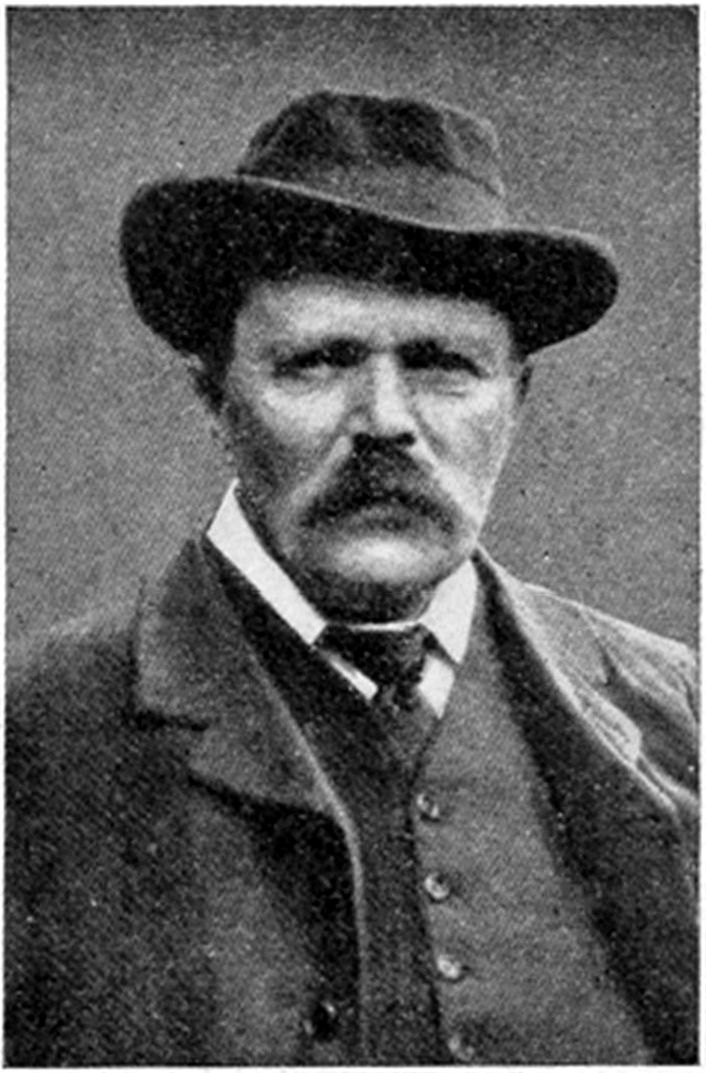
- John Milne, c. 1910
- Born: 30 December 1850; Liverpool, England
- Died: 31 July 1913 (aged 62); Shide, Isle of Wight, England
- Occupations: Scientist, educator, foreign advisor to Japan
- Known for: Foreign advisor to Meiji Japan
- Spouse: Tone Horikawa
- Awards: Lyell Medal (1894); Royal Medal (1908)

John Milne (30 December 1850 – 31 July 1913) was a British geologist and mining engineer who worked on a horizontal seismograph.

== Early life and education ==
Milne was born in Liverpool, England, the only child of John Milne of Milnrow, and at first raised in Tunshill and later moved to Richmond, London, and then in 1895 to the Isle of Wight with his wife. He was educated at King's College London (AKC in Applied Science, 1870) and the Royal School of Mines.

== Career ==
=== Early career ===
In the summers of 1873 and 1874, following a recommendation by the Royal School of Mines, Milne was hired by Cyrus Field as a mining engineer to explore Newfoundland and Labrador in search of coal and mineral resources. During this time he also wrote papers on the interaction of ice and rock, and visited Funk Island, writing another paper on the newly extinct great auk. In December 1873 Milne accompanied Dr Charles Tilstone Beke on an expedition to determine the true location of Mount Sinai in northwest Arabia. He took the opportunity to study the geology of the Sinai Peninsula and passed on a collection of fossils to the British Museum.

=== Career in Japan (1875–1895) ===
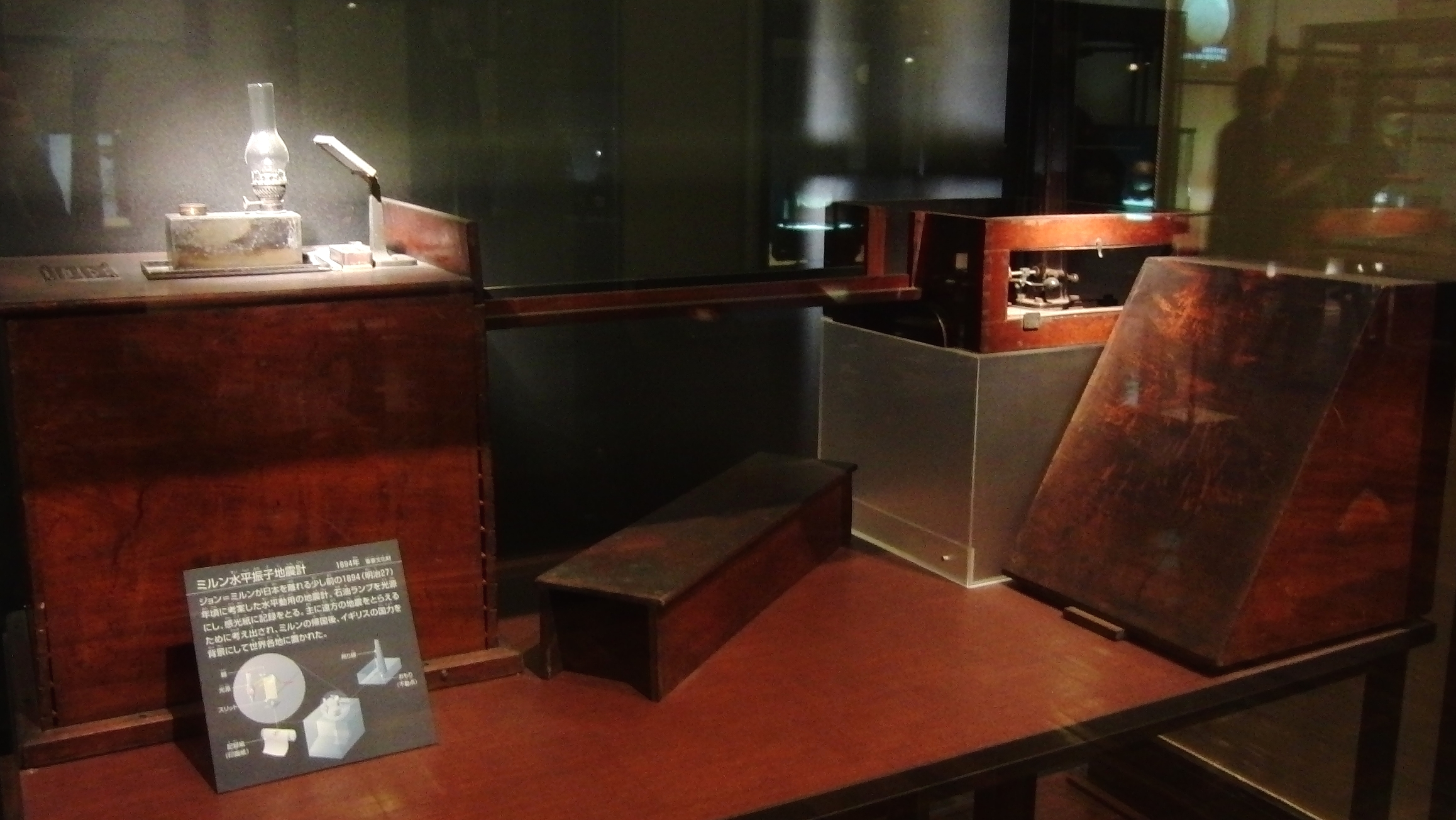
Milne horizontal pendulum seismograph. One of the Important Cultural Properties of Japan. Exhibit in the National Museum of Nature and Science, Tokyo, Japan.

Milne was hired by the Meiji government of the Empire of Japan as a foreign advisor and professor of mining and geology at the Imperial College of Engineering in Tokyo from 8 March 1876, where he worked under Henry Dyer and with William Edward Ayrton and John Perry. Partly from a sense of adventure and partly because he suffered from seasickness, he travelled overland across Siberia taking three months to reach Tokyo.

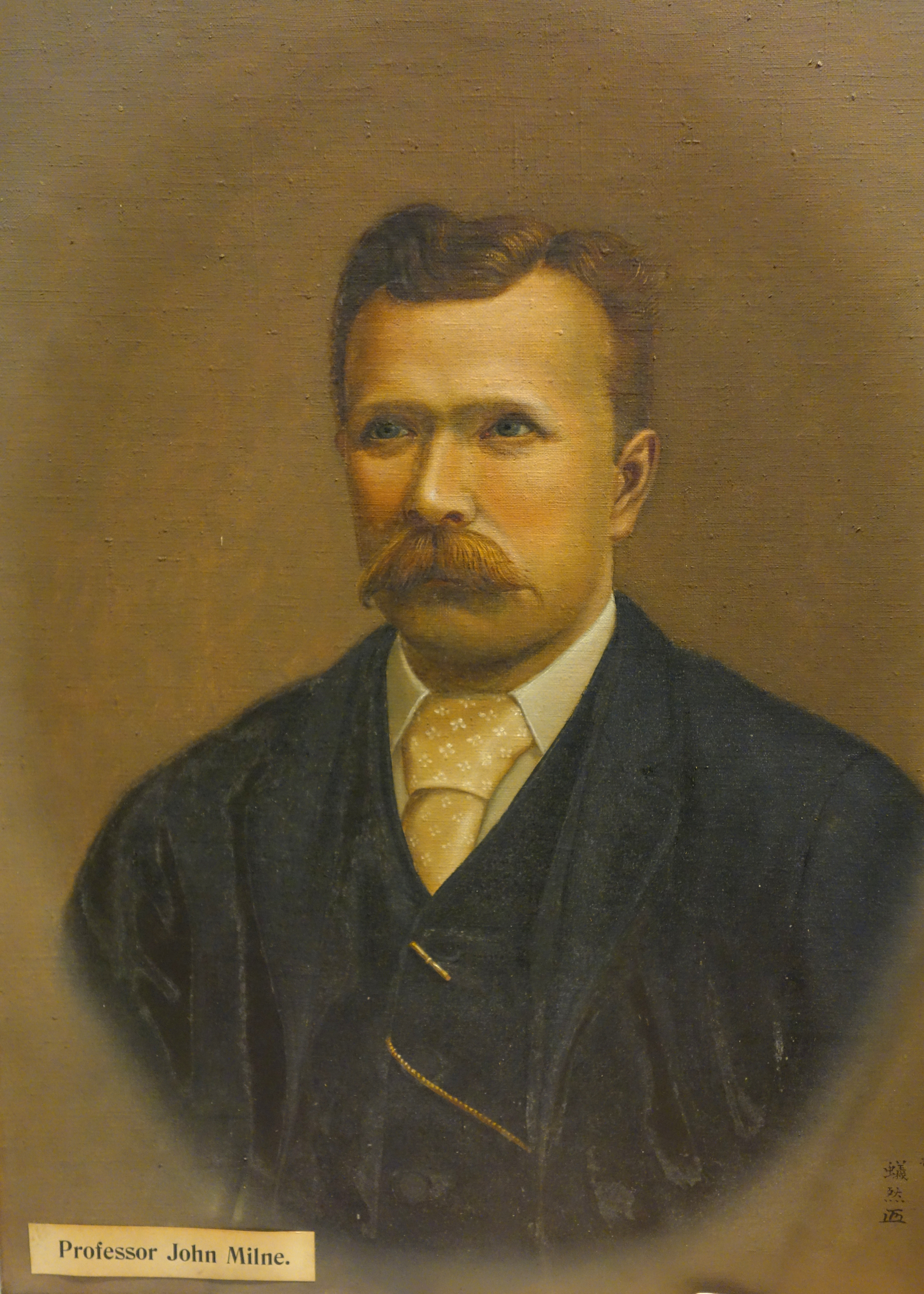
Portrait of Milne in the National Museum of Nature and Science, Tokyo

In 1880, Sir Alfred Ewing, Thomas Gray, and John Milne, all British scientists working in Japan, began to study earthquakes following a very large tremor which struck the Yokohama area that year. They founded the Seismological Society of Japan (SSJ). The society funded the invention of seismographs to detect and measure the strength of earthquakes. Although all three men worked as a team on the invention and use of seismographs, John Milne is generally credited with the invention of the horizontal pendulum seismograph in 1880. Milne's instruments permitted him to detect different types of seismic waves, and estimate velocities. In addition, the foreign professors trained Japanese students including Seikei Sekiya who would become, at the Imperial University, the first professor of seismology at any university in the world and his successor, Fusakichi Omori who refined Milne's instruments to detect and record finer vibrations. In 1881, he had married Tone Horikawa, daughter of Horikawa Noritsune in Hakodate.

=== Order of the Rising Sun ===
In June 1895, Milne was commanded to attend a meeting with His Imperial Majesty Emperor Mutsuhito and following this, returned to England. Soon after his arrival he learned that the Emperor had conferred upon him a rare distinction, The Third Grade of the Order of the Rising Sun and a life pension of 1,000 yen. This was in recognition of Professor Milne's contributions to seismology during his long residence in Japan.

=== Contributions to anthropology ===
From 1882, Milne contributed also to anthropology. He helped to develop theories on the origin of the Ainu of northern Japan and on the prehistoric racial background of Japan in general. He excavated for several years in the Omori shell mound and introduced the concept of the Koro-pok-guru, linked with the Inuit. Koropok-guru is from an Ainu word meaning "the man under the Fuki," i.e. a small person. An Ainu legend concerning their existence seems first to have been reported by Milne. But he believed their prehistoric sites to be only in Hokkaidō. For northeastern Japan proper, he supported the tradition which ascribed prehistoric sites to the Ainu, who lived in pits and made stone implements and pottery. He considered the inhabitants of the Kurile Islands, Sakhalin and southern Kamchatka to be of a different race, but possibly related to the Koro-pok-guru. He anticipated the work of scientists who recognised, in excavated materials, different prehistoric cultures for Hokkaidō and northeastern Japan. His first cousin William Scoresby Routledge (related through his mother, Emma Twycross) was also an anthropologist. With his wife Katherine, Routledge worked in the early twentieth century in East Africa with the Kikuyu and on Easter Island (Rapa Nui).

=== Career in England (1895–1913) ===
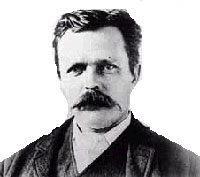
John Milne, c. 1900

After a fire on 17 February 1895 destroyed his home, observatory, library, and many of his instruments, Milne resigned his posts on 20 June 1895 and returned to England with his Japanese wife, settling at Shide Hill House, Shide, on the Isle of Wight, where he continued his seismographic studies. He was made a professor emeritus of Tokyo Imperial University.

He was elected a Fellow of the Royal Society in 1887 and persuaded the Society to fund 20 earthquake observatories around the world, equipped with his horizontal pendulum seismographs. His network initially included seven in England, three in Russia, two in Canada (one in Toronto and one in Victoria, British Columbia), three on the east coast of the United States, and one in Antarctica, eventually growing to total forty worldwide. These stations sent their 'station registers' to Milne, where the data formed the basis of Milne's researches. For the next 20 years, Milne's seismological observatory was the world headquarters for earthquake seismology. In 1898, Milne (with W. K. Burton) published Earthquakes and Other Earth Movements, which came to be regarded as a classic textbook on earthquakes.

The need for international exchange of readings was soon recognised by Milne in his annual "Shide Circular Reports on Earthquakes" published from 1900 to 1912. This work was destined to develop in the International Seismological Summary being set up immediately after the First World War.

He delivered the Bakerian Lecture to the Royal Society in 1906 entitled Recent Advances in Seismology and was awarded their Royal Medal in 1908.

Milne died of Bright's disease on 31 July 1913 and, after a service in St. Paul's Church, Newport, was buried in the civic cemetery to the north of the church. His Japanese wife Tone returned to Japan in 1919 and died in 1926.

To mark the 100th anniversary of Milne's death, a public artwork has been commissioned for Little London near the harbour at Newport. The local Parish Council is providing a detailed explanatory board at Shide.

== Legacy ==
- Both Simushir island's highest point and a bay at the northwest coast of the island's southwest end are named for John Milne (Milna volcano and Milna bay in Russia's Kurils Islands).
