= Brouton Bay =

Cove on Simushir Island, Russia

Coordinates: 47.1416667°N 152.2183333°E

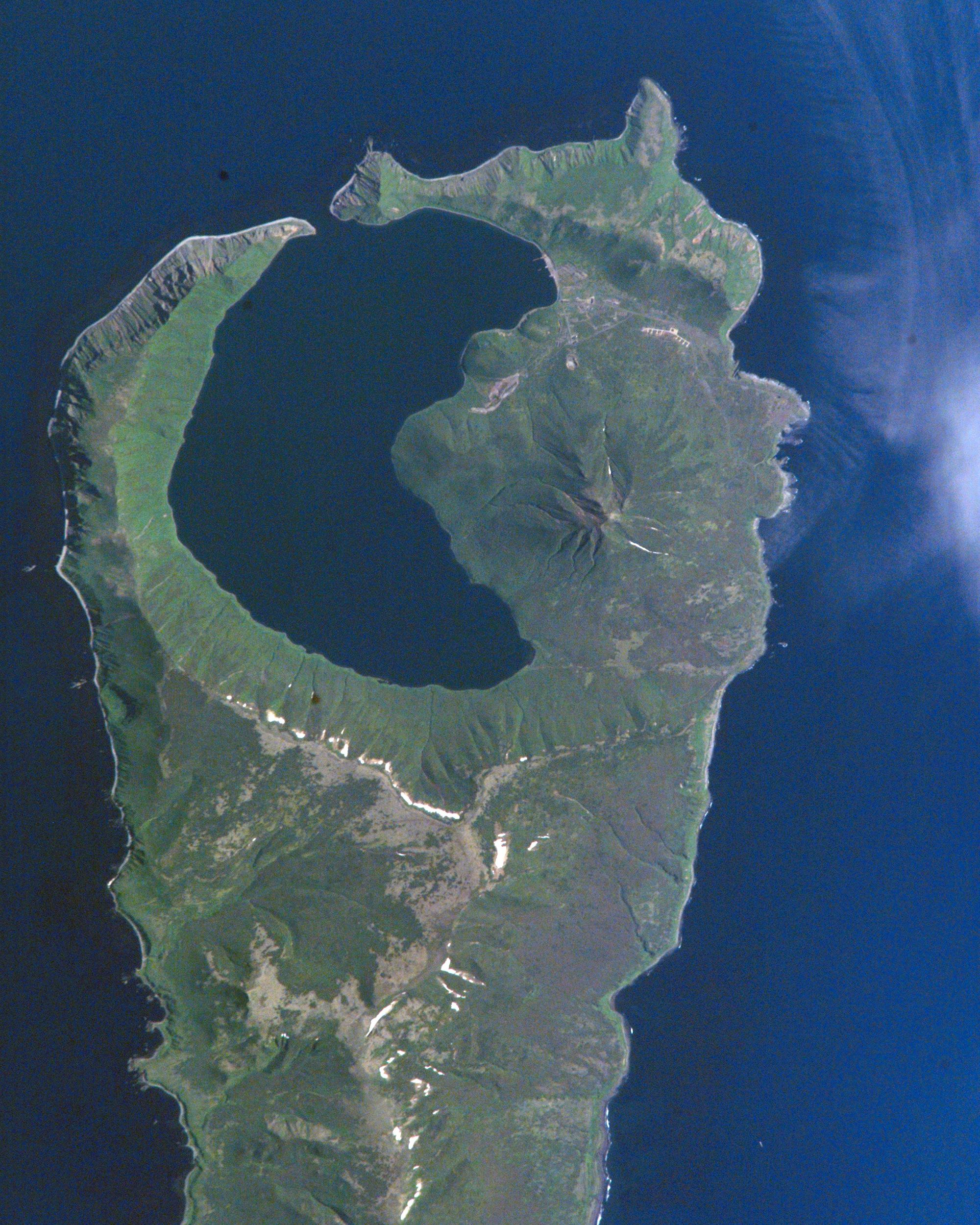

Brouton Bay (Russian: бухта Броутона, bukhta Broutona) is a bay formed within the volcanic caldera of Urataman volcano at the northern end of Simushir Island in the Kuril Islands, Russia.

The bay is named for William Robert Broughton, who surveyed Simushir (then Marikan) in October 1796.

During the Soviet era the Russians were making some efforts to construct a naval base for the Red Banner Pacific Fleet in the north-eastern part of the bay.
