= Milna (volcano) =

Somma volcano in Kuril Islands, Russia

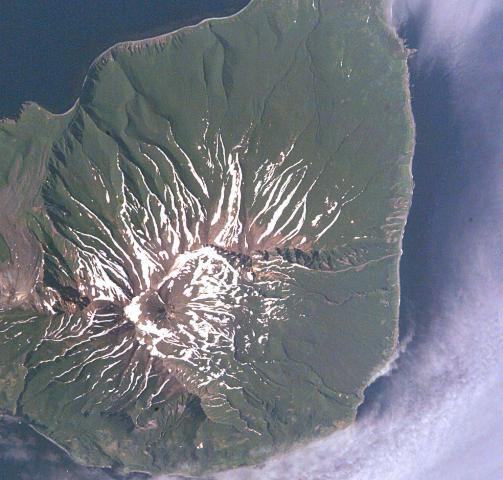

Highest point
- Elevation: 1,504 m (4,934 ft)
- Coordinates: 46.82°N 151.78°E

Geography
- Location within Far Eastern Federal District
- Location: Simushir, Kuril Islands, Russia

Geology
- Mountain type: Somma volcano
- Last eruption: Unknown

Milna (Russian: Мильна; Japanese: 新知岳, Shinshiru-dake) is a somma volcano located at the southern end of Simushir Island, Kuril Islands, Russia. It is the highest point of the island. Its name is derived from John Milne, а British geologist and mining engineer who helped to develop theories on the origin of the Ainu people.

== See also ==
- List of volcanoes in Russia
