= Thomas Lomar Gray =

Scottish engineer (1850–1908)

- Born: 4 February 1850; Lochgelly, Fife, Scotland,
- Died: 19 December 1908 (aged 58)
- Occupations: scientist, educator, foreign advisor to Japan

Thomas Lomar Gray (4 February 1850 – 19 December 1908) was a Scottish engineer noted for his pioneering work in seismology.

== Early life ==
Born in Lochgelly, Fife, Scotland, Gray graduated in 1878 from the University of Glasgow with a BSc in engineering. At Glasgow, he awarded the Cleland Medal for "An Experimental Determination of Magnetic Moments in Absolute Measurements.".

== Career ==
At the recommendation of John Milne, he was hired by the government of Japan as a foreign advisor and arrived in Tokyo in 1879 to assume to post of Professor of Telegraph Engineering in the Physical Laboratories at the Tokyo Imperial University. Later, while working at the Imperial College of Engineering in Tokyo, he helped John Milne and James Alfred Ewing develop the first modern seismometers from 1880 to 1895. Although all three men worked as a team on the invention and use of seismographs, John Milne is generally credited with the invention of the first modern horizontal-pendulum seismograph.

Gray joined Milne and Ewing in founding the Seismological Society of Japan (SSJ) in 1880.

Gray served as Private Assistant to Sir William Thomson (Lord Kelvin), Professor of Natural Philosophy in Glasgow University from 1884 to 1887. Thomson also proposed Gray as a Fellow of the Royal Society of Edinburgh (FRSE)

Among Gray's colleagues in Japan was Thomas C. Mendenhall. Inn 1888, Mendenhall encouraged him to join the faculty of Rose Polytechnic Institute of Technology, now Rose-Hulman Institute of Technology in Terre Haute, Indiana in the United States. His title was Professor of Dynamic Engineering. He was vice president of Rose Polytechnic from 1891 through 1908. He died on 19 December 1908 and is commemorated in a plaque by the entrance to the old drill hall in Lochgelly
