= Gerasim Izmailov =

Russian navigator (c. 1745 – after 1795)

Gerasim Grigoryevich Izmaylov (Russian: Герасим Григорьевич Измайлов; c. 1745 – after 1795) was a Russian navigator involved in the Russian colonization of the Americas and in the establishment of the colonies of Russian America in Alaska. He was responsible for the first detailed maps of the Aleutian Islands.

== Life ==
A native of Yakutsk, Izmaylov attended a navigation school in Irkutsk. He studied with Dmitry Bocharov, who became his lifelong business companion. In April 1771, both were caught up in the Benyovszky mutiny at Bolsheretsk on Kamchatka. Izmaylov attempted to break away from the mutineers but, after being flogged, was marooned on the isle of Simushir, one of the uninhabited Kuril Islands. For a year he subsisted on "scallops, grass, and roots" before being rescued by yasak gatherers. He was investigated in Irkutsk on account of his association with Benyovszky, but was eventually cleared of all charges in 1774.

In 1775, Izmaylov assumed command of the boat St. Paul and set to work mapping the shores of the Aleutian Islands. In October 1778, while visiting Unalaska, he made the acquaintance of Captain James Cook who presented him with an octant in exchange for a letter of introduction to the Kamchatka authorities. Cook also handed over to Izmaylov a recently drawn map of the western coast of North America, which was to be delivered by the Russians to the British Admiralty. Izmailov impressed Cook, who wrote:

This Mr Ismyloff seemed to have abilities to intitle him to a higher station in life than that in which he was employed, he was tolerably well versed in Astronomy and other necessary parts of the Mathematicks. I complemented him with an Hadlys Octant and altho it was the first he had perhaps ever seen, yet he made himself acquainted with most of the uses that Instrument is capable of in a very short time.

In 1783–1785, Izmaylov and Grigory Shelikhov made their historic voyage from Okhotsk to Kodiak Island, where they founded the first Russian settlement in America. In 1789, Izmaylov became the first to explore and map the Kenai Peninsula. Three years later, he took up employment under Alexander Baranov, helping him withstand a sea attack by the Tlingit.

Having wintered in Unalaska, Izmaylov visited Saint Paul Island, where he discovered the crew of a Russian ship that had been missing since 1791. He brought them back to Okhotsk in June 1794. He is mentioned for the last time in 1795, when he accompanied to Alaska a group of Orthodox missionaries under Father Joasaph.

== Sources ==
- (in Russian) Biographical Dictionary of the Russian Far East and Russian America
- Postnikov, Alekseĭ Vladimirovich (15 June 2015). Exploring and Mapping Alaska: The Russian America Era, 1741-1867. University of Alaska Press. ISBN 978-1-60223-251-8.
