= Uratman =

Mountain in Russia

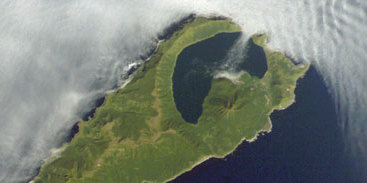

Highest point
- Elevation: 678 m (2,224 ft)
- Coordinates: 47.12°N 152.25°E

Geography
- Location within Far Eastern Federal District
- Location: Simushir, Kuril Islands, Russia

Geology
- Rock age: Pleistocene to Holocene
- Mountain type: Somma volcano
- Last eruption: Unknown

Uratman (Russian: Уратман) is a somma volcano located at the northern end of Simushir Island, Kuril Islands, Russia. It consists of a Pleistocene caldera which contains an andesite cone of Holocene age. The caldera is exposed to the ocean, forming Brouton Bay.

== See also ==
- List of volcanoes in Russia
