= Prevo Peak =

Stratovolcano

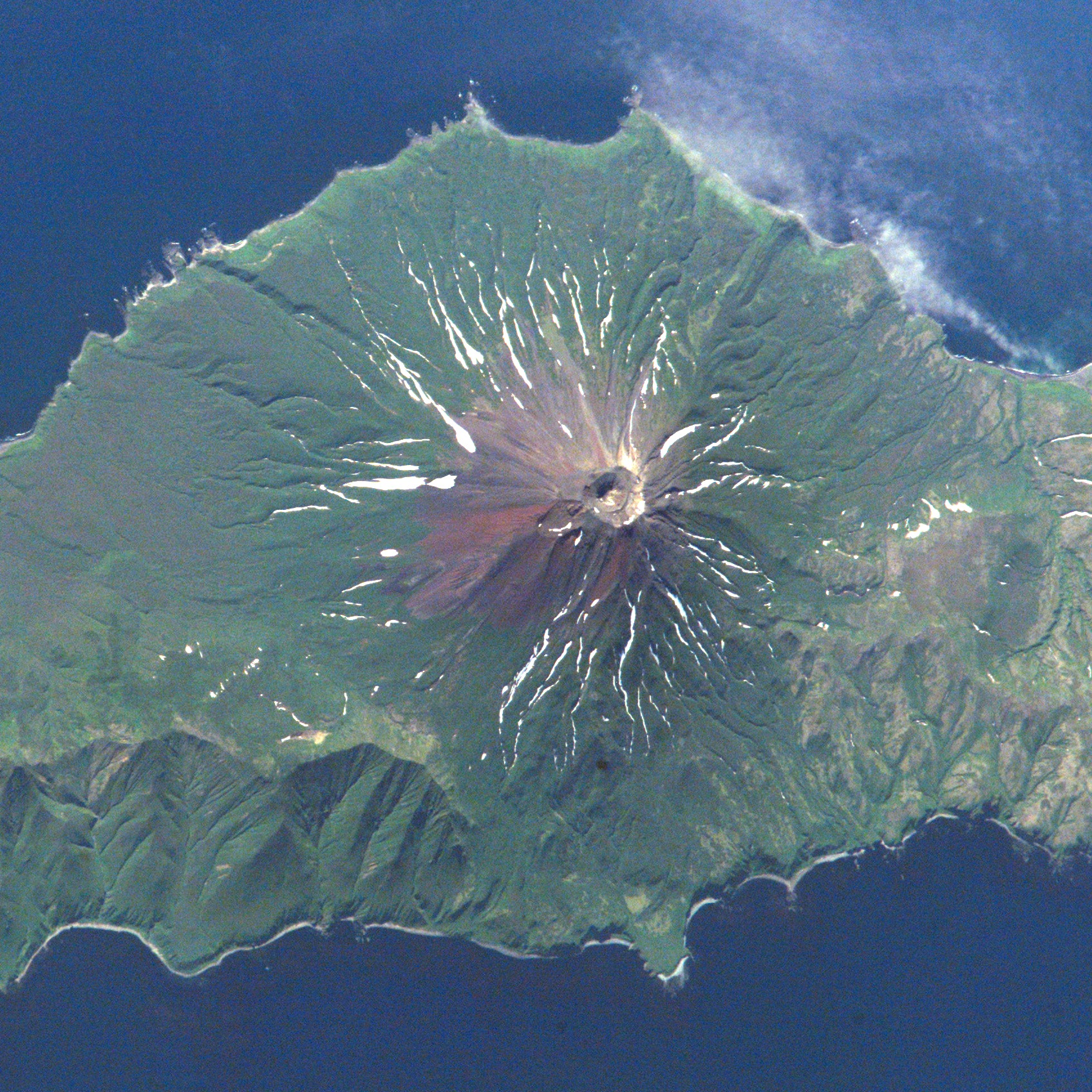
- Prevo Peak seen from ISS in 2002

Highest point
- Elevation: 1,360 m (4,460 ft)
- Prominence: 1,299 m (4,262 ft)
- Listing: Ribu
- Coordinates: 47.02°N 152.12°E

Geography
- Location within Far Eastern Federal District
- Location: Simushir, Kuril Islands, Russia

Geology
- Mountain type: Stratovolcano
- Last eruption: 1825 ± 25 years

Prevo Peak (Russian: Прево́) is a stratovolcano located in the central part of Simushir Island, Kuril Islands, Russia.

== See also ==
- List of volcanoes in Russia
