= Earth, Planets and Space =

- Discipline: Earth and planetary sciences
- Language: English
- Edited by: Masahito Nosé

Publication details
- Former names: Journal of Geomagnetism and Geoelectricity; Journal of Physics of the Earth
- History: 1949–present
- Publisher: Springer Science+Business Media
- Open access: Yes
- Impact factor: 3.3 (2025)

Standard abbreviations
- ISO 4: Earth Planets Space

Indexing
- CODEN: EPSPFJ
- ISSN: 1343-8832 (print); 1880-5981 (web)
- LCCN: sn98038189
- OCLC no.: 55070850
- Journal of Geomagnetism and Geoelectricity
- ISSN: 0022-1392 (print); 2185-5765 (web)
- Journal of Physics of the Earth
- ISSN: 0022-3743 (print); 1884-2305 (web)

Links
- Journal homepage; Online access; Journal page at Springer website; Online archive, Journal of Geomagnetism and Geoelectricity; Online archive, Journal of Physics of the Earth

Earth, Planets and Space is a peer-reviewed open access scientific journal published by Springer Science+Business Media and Terra Scientific Publishing Company on behalf of five Japanese learned societies:

- Seismological Society of Japan,
- Society of Geomagnetism and Earth, Planetary and Space Sciences,
- Volcanological Society of Japan,
- Geodetic Society of Japan, and
- Japanese Society for Planetary Sciences.

It was established in 1949 as the Journal of Geomagnetism and Geoelectricity and obtained its current name in 1998 when it absorbed the Journal of Physics of the Earth (established 1952). The editor-in-chief is Masahito Nosé (Nagoya City University).

== Abstracting and indexing ==
The journal is abstracted and indexed in:

- Astrophysics Data System
- Current Contents/Physical, Chemical & Earth Sciences
- Earthquake Engineering Abstracts
- GEOBASE
- GeoRef
- INIS Atomindex
- Inspec
- Science Citation Index
- Scopus
