= Seismological Society of Japan =

Japanese seismological learned society

- Abbreviation: SSJ
- Formation: 1880
- Type: Non-profit
- Purpose: the advancement of seismology
- Website: https://www.zisin.jp/

The Seismological Society of Japan (日本地震学会, Nihon jishin Gakkai) or SSJ is a learned society (professional association) with the goal of advancing the understanding of earthquakes and other seismic phenomena.

== History ==
John Milne joined James Alfred Ewing, Thomas Lomar Gray and Thomas Corwin Mendenhall in founding the Seismological Society in 1880. These men were teaching at the Imperial College of Tokyo (now called the University of Tokyo) and were foreign advisors to the government in Meiji period Japan (o-yatoi gaikokujin).

The founding president of the society was Hattori Ichizo.

== Publications ==
The organization publishes the Journal of the Seismological Society of Japan (地震, Jishin) abbreviated at "J Seismol Soc Jpn". The publication is also known as Zisin, which is a syllabic abbreviation. The SSJ also sponsors the journal Earth, Planets and Space.
