= Jean de Hautefeuille =

Abbé Jean de Hautefeuille
- Born: 20 March 1647; Orléans, France
- Died: 18 October 1724 (aged 77); Orléans, France
- Engineering career
- Discipline: Horology
- Awards: Fellow of the Royal Society

Jean de Hautefeuille (French pronunciation: [ʒɑ̃ də otfœj], 20 March 1647 – 18 October 1724) was a French abbé, physicist and inventor.

== Biography ==
Hautefeuille was born in Orléans, France. While still young, his experimental activities came to the attention of Marie Anne Mancini, Duchesse de Bouillon, who became his patroness and brought him into her entourage. In this way, he was able to travel through Italy and England. Through the Duchess' patronage, he came to be ordained as a priest of the Roman Catholic Church. His passion, however, was for the sciences rather than religious matters, and he focused on the field of engineering design.

One of Hautefeuille's most important achievements was his proposal to use a spiral spring with a balance wheel in place of a pendulum to control a clock. In the 1670s, he was involved in a dispute with Christiaan Huygens, who along with Robert Hooke claimed priority. Huygens is today generally credited with the invention as he managed to perfect it and the first watch using one was made under his direction.

Hautefeuille also conducted investigations in acoustics, investigating the action of speaking trumpets, and wrote an essay on the cause of echoes which was awarded a prize by the Academy of Bordeaux in 1718. He also made improvements in lenses, and suggested a method of raising water using the explosive action of gunpowder. He was also interested in the phenomenon of the tides, and invented an instrument called a thalassometer to register them.

In 1678 Hautefeuille proposed an early form of internal combustion engine, which was to use gunpowder as a fuel, but it seems unlikely that any such machine was ever constructed by him. He was, however, the first person to propose the use of a piston in a heat engine. Huygens proposed a similar device two years later in 1680 based on de Hautefeuille's suggestion and appears to have constructed some form of prototype.

Though considered intelligent, Hautefeuille rarely perfected his inventions, and was inclined to prematurely publish ideas and then abandon them in favour of new pursuits. The Paris Academy of Sciences attested the value and usefulness of many of his discoveries, but it never conferred on him the honour of electing him as a member. He was however elected a Fellow of the Royal Society of London in 1687.

He was the author of a number of essays on a variety of subjects.
