= Simushir =

Uninhabited island in the Kuril Island chain

Native name: Симушир (Russian); 新知島 (Japanese); シムシㇼ (Ainu)
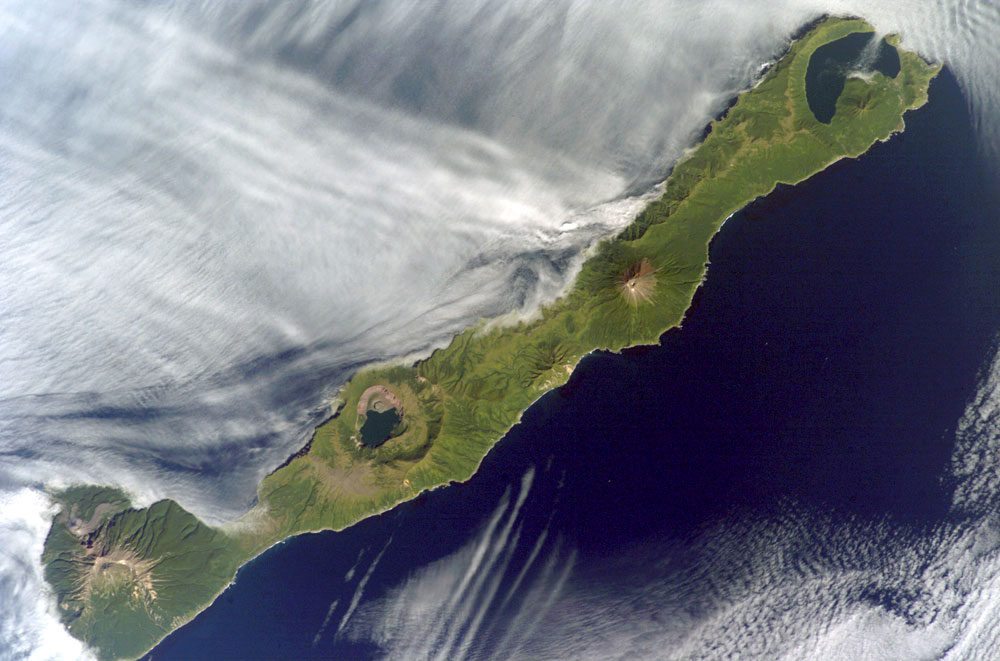
- NASA picture of Simushir Island

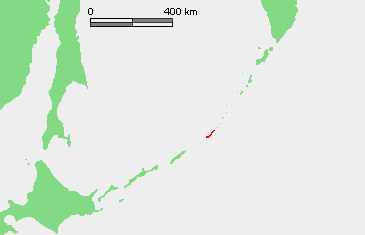

Geography
- Location: Sea of Okhotsk
- Coordinates: 46.97°N 152.03°E
- Archipelago: Kuril Islands
- Area: 227.6 km^{2} (87.9 sq mi)
- Highest elevation: 1,540 m (5050 ft)

Administration
- Russia

Demographics
- Population: 0

Simushir (Russian: Симушир; Japanese: 新知島, romanized: Shimushiru-tō; Ainu: シムシㇼ, romanized: Simusir), meaning Large Island in the Ainu language, is an uninhabited volcanic island near the center of the Kuril Islands chain in the Sea of Okhotsk in the northwest Pacific Ocean. It was formerly known as Marikan.

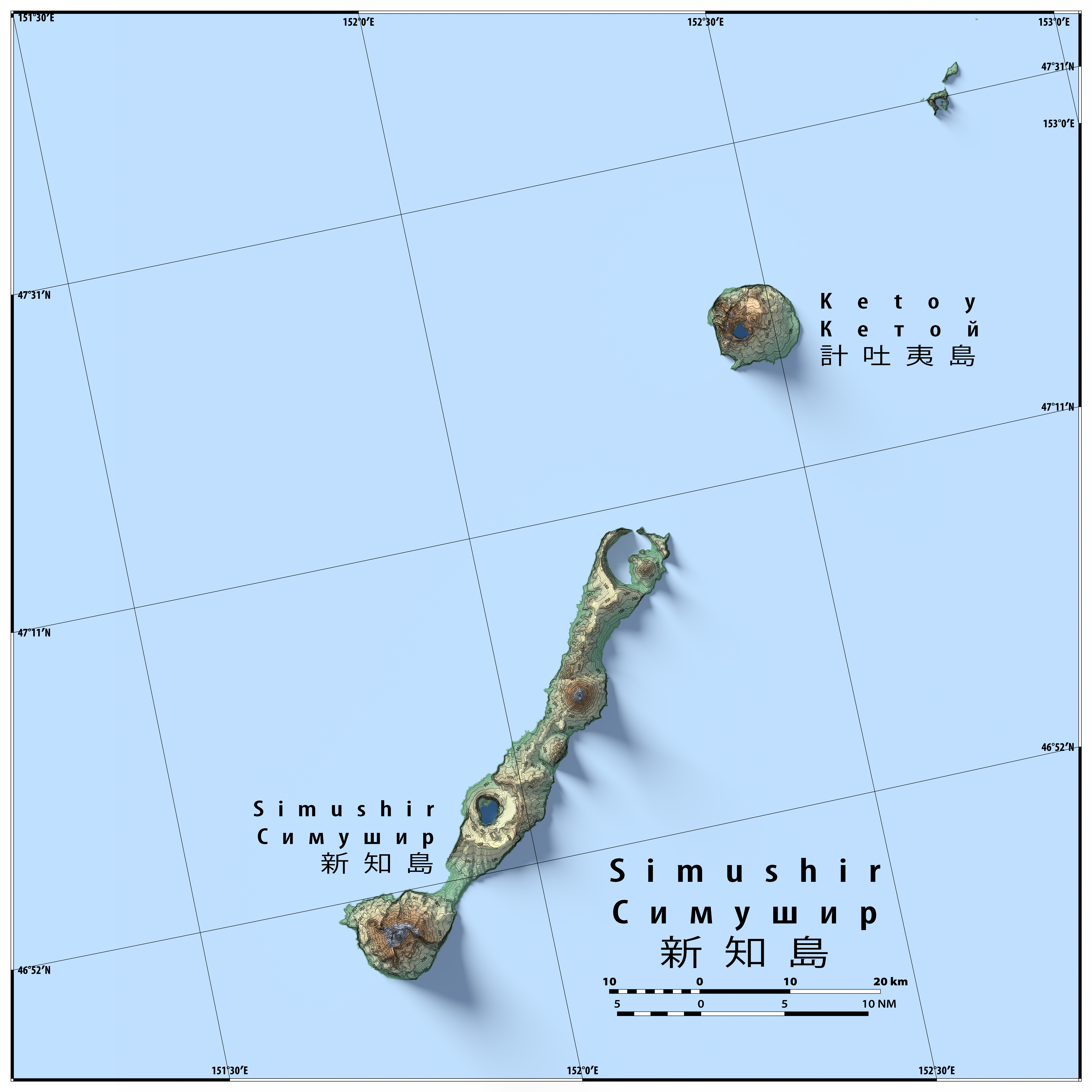
Topographic map of Simushir

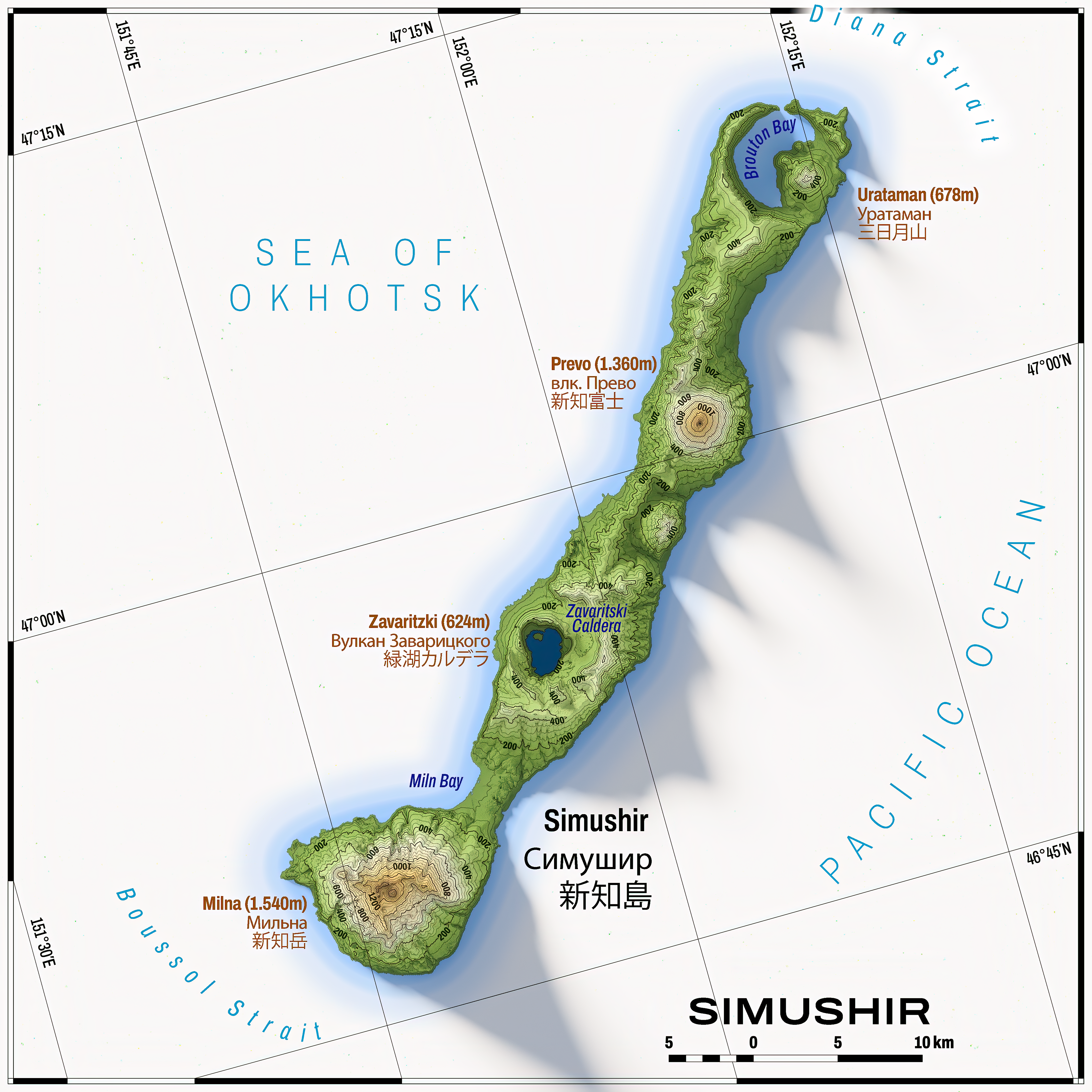
Detailed map of Simushir

== History ==
Simushir was inhabited by the Ainu. The island appears on an official map showing the territories of Matsumae Domain, a feudal domain of Edo period Japan dated 1644, and these holdings were officially confirmed by the Tokugawa shogunate in 1715. Russian explorer Gerasim Izmailov was marooned on Simushir in the early 1770s. He spent a full year subsisting on "scallops, grass, and roots"..

Sovereignty initially passed to Russia under the terms of the Treaty of Shimoda, but was returned to the Empire of Japan per the Treaty of Saint Petersburg, along with the rest of the Kuril islands. The island was formerly administered as part of Shimushiru District of Nemuro Subprefecture of Hokkaidō. Settlers on the island were engaged in fishing, and the raising of Arctic fox and reindeer. During World War II, the civilian population was evacuated to the Japanese home islands and Simushir was garrisoned by a detachment from the Imperial Japanese Army. It was surrendered to Soviet forces during the Battle of the Kuril Islands without resistance.

Under the Soviet Union, Brouton Bay was used by the Soviet Navy as a secret submarine base between 1987 and 1994, and had a population of approximately 3000 people. The remains of the base can be seen clearly on satellite images.

Today, the island is uninhabited. It is currently administered as part of the Sakhalin Oblast of the Russian Federation.

== Geology ==
Simushir is highly elongated, consisting of a series of stratovolcanos. The island has a length of 59 kilometres (37 mi) with a width of 13 kilometres (8.1 mi), and an area of 227.6 square kilometres (87.9 sq mi). At the north end of the island is a half-submerged caldera, Brouton Bay, with an entrance only 2.5 meters deep, plunging to 240 meters in the center.

- Urataman (Russian: Уратаман, Japanese: 三日月山, Mikazuki Yama), 678 metres (2,224 ft) high and overlooking Brouton Bay, is the northernmost stratovolcano of the island. Further south are:
- Prevo (Russian: влк. Прево, Japanese: 新知富士, Shimushiru Fuji), with a height of 1,360 metres (4,460 ft). The peak erupted in the early 19th century, forming a symmetrical cone with a resemblance to Mount Fuji. On the summit is a 450 × 600 meter wide summit crater with a small caldera lake on its floor. Lava flows from the summit reach both coasts of central Simushir. Only two eruptions are known from Prevo Peak in historical times. The largest of these, during the 1760s, produced pyroclastic flows that destroyed all vegetation at the foot of the volcano. Weak explosive activity occurred during the most recent eruption, in the early 19th century.
- Zavaritzki (Russian: Вулкан Заварицкого, Japanese: 緑湖カルデラ, Midoriko Karudera), with a height of 624 metres (2,047 ft), and a 2 × 3 kilometer fresh water caldera lake. Several young cones and lava domes are located near the margins the lake. An eruption in 1831 may have affected the global climate. A lava dome created in the 1916 and 1931 eruptions formed a small island in the northern part of the lake. In 1957, a new 350 meter wide, 40 meter high lava dome was created following explosive eruptions, decreasing the size of the lake.
- Milna (Russian: Мильна, Japanese: 新知岳, Shimushiru Dake), with a height of 1,540 metres (5,050 ft), is the highest point on the island. This volcano erupted in 1881 and in 1914. The outer flanks of the steep-sided mountain are dissected by deep gullies, with lava flows extending to the sea. The three kilometer wide caldera was breached to the south due to glaciations.
- Goriaschaia Sopka (Russian: Горящая Сопка, Japanese: 焼山; Yake Yama), with a height of 891 metres (2,923 ft), is on the southwest end of the island. This volcano erupted in 1881 and in 1914.

== Climate ==
In spite of its temperate latitude, the powerful Oyashio Current on the western flank of the Aleutian Low gives Simushir a chilly and very wet subarctic climate (Köppen Dfc) that amazingly almost qualifies as a polar climate (ET), which in low-lying areas would be expected only at latitudes about 20 degrees or 2,200 kilometres (1,370 mi) further north. Unlike typical subarctic or polar climates, however, the winters are only moderately severe and there is no permafrost since the mean annual temperature is around 2.8 °C (37.0 °F), whilst temperatures have never fallen below −22.2 °C (−8 °F). However, the extreme winds, which in winter average as much as 43 kilometres per hour (27 mph), make it feel much colder. Summers are mild, but extraordinarily cloudy with fogs occurring on six-sevenths of all days in summer and annual sunshine hours less than 1,100 per year, which is comparable to Reykjavík or the extremely foggy Sichuan Basin. Sunshine is actually most likely in the wettest months of September and October when the heavy rain removes the low-level fog, but clear days are extremely rare at any time of year.

Climate data for Simushir Island (1948–1997)
Month	Jan	Feb	Mar	Apr	May	Jun	Jul	Aug	Sep	Oct	Nov	Dec	Year
Record high °C (°F)	10.0 (50.0)	8.0 (46.4)	11.1 (52.0)	19.2 (66.6)	25.0 (77.0)	28.1 (82.6)	32.0 (89.6)	31.0 (87.8)	26.8 (80.2)	20.9 (69.6)	18.3 (64.9)	11.3 (52.3)	32.0 (89.6)
Mean maximum °C (°F)	1.4 (34.5)	1.4 (34.5)	4.7 (40.5)	12.7 (54.9)	15.1 (59.2)	17.6 (63.7)	21.8 (71.2)	24.4 (75.9)	20.6 (69.1)	16.3 (61.3)	12.2 (54.0)	5.3 (41.5)	28.3 (82.9)
Mean daily maximum °C (°F)	−2.5 (27.5)	−3.0 (26.6)	−1.4 (29.5)	3.3 (37.9)	7.2 (45.0)	9.1 (48.4)	12.5 (54.5)	14.7 (58.5)	13.8 (56.8)	10.1 (50.2)	4.6 (40.3)	0.1 (32.2)	5.7 (42.3)
Daily mean °C (°F)	−4.5 (23.9)	−5 (23)	−3.4 (25.9)	0.7 (33.3)	3.6 (38.5)	5.5 (41.9)	8.8 (47.8)	10.7 (51.3)	10.2 (50.4)	7.0 (44.6)	2.0 (35.6)	−2 (28)	3.1 (37.6)
Mean daily minimum °C (°F)	−6.9 (19.6)	−7.4 (18.7)	−5.9 (21.4)	−1.9 (28.6)	0.7 (33.3)	2.6 (36.7)	5.4 (41.7)	7.2 (45.0)	6.8 (44.2)	3.9 (39.0)	−0.7 (30.7)	−4.5 (23.9)	−0.1 (31.9)
Mean minimum °C (°F)	−12.2 (10.0)	−14.0 (6.8)	−11.6 (11.1)	−5.7 (21.7)	−2.6 (27.3)	−0.8 (30.6)	1.0 (33.8)	4.2 (39.6)	3.2 (37.8)	−0.6 (30.9)	−6.2 (20.8)	−8.7 (16.3)	−15.4 (4.3)
Record low °C (°F)	−22.2 (−8.0)	−22.2 (−8.0)	−19 (−2)	−11.8 (10.8)	−5.0 (23.0)	−6.1 (21.0)	0.3 (32.5)	0.6 (33.1)	0 (32)	−7.2 (19.0)	−12.8 (9.0)	−18.9 (−2.0)	−22.2 (−8.0)
Average precipitation mm (inches)	74.2 (2.92)	81.9 (3.22)	82.0 (3.23)	88.6 (3.49)	112.3 (4.42)	72.1 (2.84)	96.5 (3.80)	121.5 (4.78)	163.9 (6.45)	151.3 (5.96)	132.9 (5.23)	91.6 (3.61)	1,268.8 (49.95)
Average precipitation days (≥ 1.0 mm)	21.1	17.9	15.3	11.5	11.1	9.0	11.1	11.7	11.6	13.6	16.9	20.5	171.3
Mean monthly sunshine hours	31.0	44.8	86.8	117.0	124.0	111.0	102.3	102.0	132.0	130.2	60.0	33.0	1,074.1
Source 1: HKO (precipitation days)
Source 2: climatebase.ru Météo Climat (records)

== Fauna ==
In the spring crested and least auklet, Leach's storm petrel, and Japanese cormorant nest on the island.

== See also ==
- List of volcanoes in Russia
- List of islands of Russia
