= Rough Bank Farmhouse =

Listed building in Newhey, Greater Manchester, England

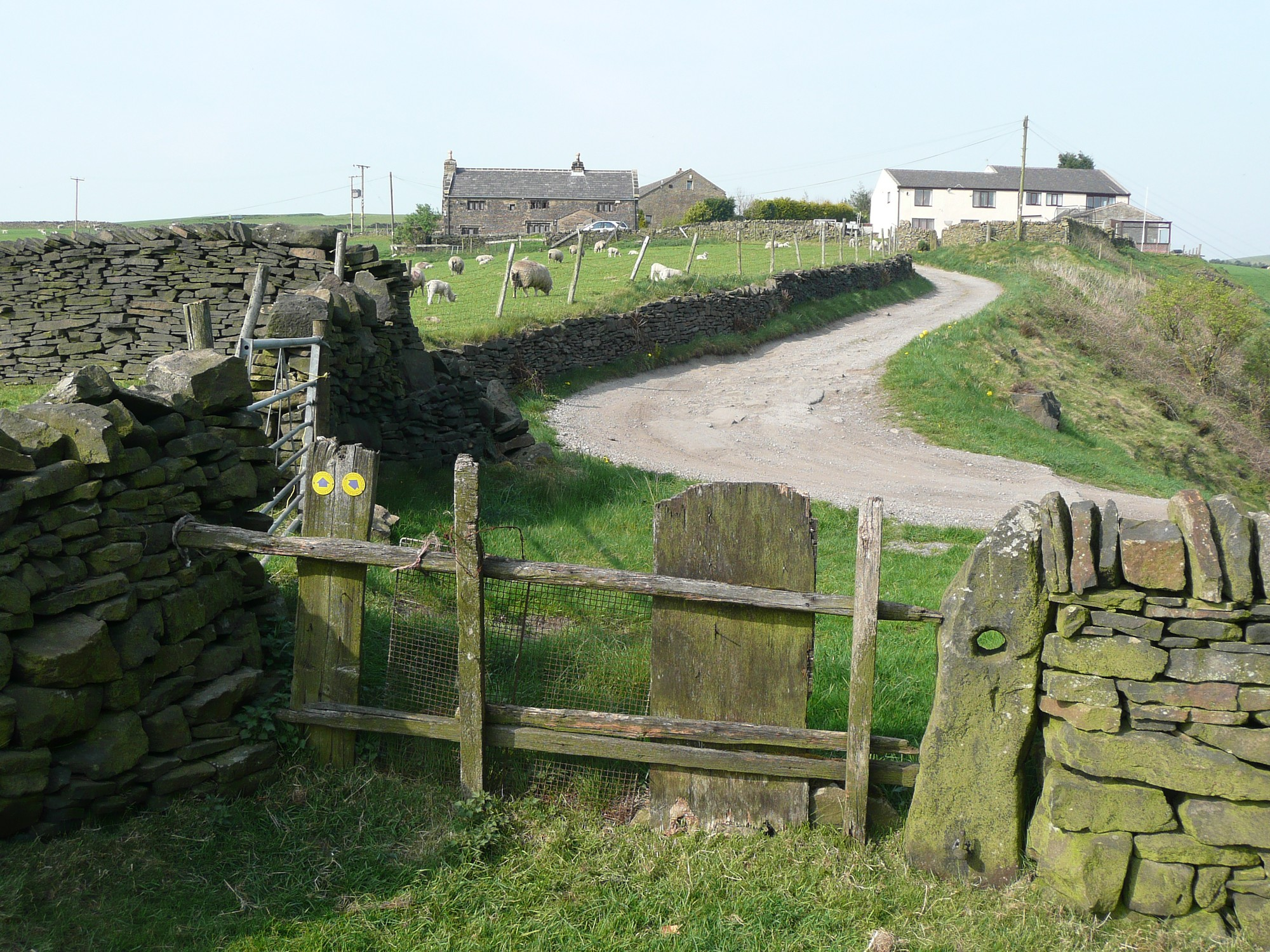
- Rough Bank Farmhouse is the left most building

- Location within Greater Manchester

General information
- Architectural style: Vernacular
- Location: Newhey, Greater Manchester, England
- Coordinates: 53.6074°N 2.0812°W
- Year built: 1607; 419 years ago

Listed Building – Grade II*
- Official name: Rough Bank Farmhouse
- Designated: 24 January 1967
- Reference no.: 1240266

Listed Building – Grade II
- Official name: Barn north of Rough Bank Farmhouse
- Designated: 23 April 1986
- Reference no.: 1240267

Rough Bank Farmhouse is a Grade II* listed building in Newhey, a village in the town of Milnrow within the Metropolitan Borough of Rochdale, Greater Manchester, England. It is an early 17th-century farmhouse notable for its well-preserved vernacular architecture and historical significance as an example of a yeoman farmer's dwelling.

== History ==
The farmhouse dates from 1607, a year inscribed on its door lintel. It was originally constructed during the late Elizabethan or early Jacobean period, reflecting the prosperity of yeoman farmers in the Pennine region. The building has remained largely intact, with only minor alterations over the centuries.

On 24 January 1967, Rough Bank Farmhouse was designated a Grade II* listed building.

== Architecture ==
The building is constructed of squared rubble stone and topped with a slate roof. It follows a traditional three-unit plan arranged over two storeys. A prominent feature of the front elevation is the gabled porch positioned between the second and third bays, which includes a chamfered door surround with an elliptical head. The inner doorway is formed of heavy timber and is set beneath an ogee-arched lintel.

The windows are mullioned and vary in size, including three-light, four-light, and additional three-light openings. These are double-chamfered with cavetto-moulded mullions and finished with hood moulds, although one mullion is missing. The gables are coped and fitted with kneelers, while the roofline is marked by ridge and gable chimney stacks, the left gable stack distinguished by diagonally set shafts. A later 19th-century window is present on the right return. At the rear, the elevation includes a two-light fire window, a four-light house-part window, and three smaller openings.

=== Interior ===
Internally, the farmhouse preserves a number of original features. The ground floor includes chamfered beams with stepped stops, along with a substantial bressummer beam and a spere post finished with ogee stops. Within the inglenook are two small wall cupboards, accompanied by a fire window and a timber heck. Several original boarded doors survive, constructed with pegged ledges and ogee-arched lintels, providing access to the heated parlour and the buttery or pantry.

From the pantry, a flight of steps leads down to a vaulted cellar, which is believed to be of later date. The roof structure is of through-purlin type, supported by collar and tie-beam trusses. On the first floor, one original door remains intact.

== Associated barn ==
A Grade II listed barn and shippon, north of Rough Bank Farmhouse, date from the 18th century but incorporate remnants of an earlier timber-framed structure, likely from the 17th century. The building is constructed of hammer-dressed stone with a graduated stone slate roof and comprises four structural bays. It features opposed cart entries in the second bay, flanked on the front by outshut shippons, which were formerly aisles. Architectural details include quoins, plain door openings to the shippons, and a 19th-century doorway on the right return with a square-cut surround. The rear cart entry is round-headed.

The roof is of through-purlin construction, supported by two collar-and-tie-beam trusses and one tie-beam truss with inclined struts. On the front side, the aisle plate and one aisle post survive, where the tie beams are diagonally braced to the walls (originally to posts). At the opposite end, the trusses are supported on brick corbels. The outbuilding adjoining the north side of the barn is not included in the listing.

== See also ==
- Grade II* listed buildings in Greater Manchester
- Listed buildings in Milnrow
