= List of mills in Rochdale =

This is a list of mills known to have existed within Rochdale Borough, in Greater Manchester, England.

== A-B ==
Name	Architect	Location	Built	Demolished	Served (Years)
Acre Works		Rochdale			
Albert Mill		Rochdale , SD906125 53°36′32″N 2°08′38″W			
Albion Mill		Rochdale , SD931161 53°38′28″N 2°06′22″W			
Albion Mill		Rochdale , SD883103 53°35′20″N 2°10′41″W			
Arkwright Mill		Rochdale , SD908011 53°37′31″N 2°08′21″W			
Arrow Mill		Rochdale SD886109 53°35′42″N 2°10′26″W			
	Notes:				
Balderstone Mill		Rochdale , SD905110 53°35′42″N 2°08′42″W			
Bamford Mills		Rochdale , SD862127 53°36′40″N 2°12′36″W			
Beal Works		Shaw, Rochdale			
Belfield Mill (part of)		Rochdale , SD918139 53°37′19″N 2°07′30″W			
Bellfield Mill		Rochdale , SD918139 53°37′19″N 2°07′30″W			
Birch Mill		Rochdale , SD833082 53°34′12″N 2°15′14″W			
Birtle Works		Rochdale , SD836124 53°36′29″N 2°14′56″W			
Blue Pits Mill		Rochdale , SD885107 53°35′35″N 2°10′30″W			
Brook Mills		Shaw, Rochdale			
Brookside Mill		Rochdale , SD873061 53°33′04″N 2°11′35″W			
Bridgefield Street Mill		Rochdale , SD889131 53°36′50″N 2°10′08″W			
Brimrod Mill		Rochdale , SD888128 53°36′43″N 2°10′16″W			
Broadfield Mill		Rochdale , SD850104 53°35′24″N 2°13′41″W			
Brook Mill		Rochdale			
Buckley Brook Mills		Rochdale , SD907149 53°37′52″N 2°08′31″W			
Buckley Lower Mill		Rochdale , SD905147 53°37′44″N 2°08′42″W			
Buckley Mill		Rochdale , SD907151 53°37′55″N 2°08′31″W			
Butterworth Hall		Milnrow; Rochdale SD 934,122 53°36′22″N 2°06′04″W		1996	
	Notes: Cotton; Textile Paper Tubes; Sonoco Milnrow's last Cotton mill				
Burma Mill		Rochdale , SD900142 53°37′26″N 2°09′11″W			

== C to D ==
Name	Architect	Location	Built	Demolished	Served (Years)
Canal Street Mill		Rochdale , SD933122 53°36′22″N 2°06′11″W			
Castleton Old Mill		Rochdale , SD892118 53°36′11″N 2°09′54″W			
Castleton Works		Rochdale , SD888101 53°35′13″N 2°10′16″W			
Church Street Mill		Rochdale , SD928127 53°36′40″N 2°06′36″W			
Clegg Hall Mill		Rochdale , SD923145 53°37′37″N 2°07′05″W			
Clough Fulling Mill		Shaw, Rochdale			
Coral Mill		Newhey, Rochdale 53°36′00″N 2°05′42″W			
	Notes:				
Coloured Spinning Company jxqnes Mill		Rochdale , SD878055			
Crawford		Rochdale SD 910,125 53°36′32″N 2°08′13″W			
	Notes:				
Crest		Rochdale OL11 2NP	1906		119
	Notes: Architect Sir Philip Sidney Stott				
Crimble		Rochdale SD 865,116 53°36′04″N 2°12′18″W	1886		139
	Notes:				
Croft		Rochdale , SD 908,139 53°37′19″N 2°08′28″W			
Crossfield Mill		Rochdale 53°36′29″N 2°08′42″W			
	Notes:				
Dale Mill		Hamer, Rochdale SD908341 53°37′34″N 2°08′19″W	1904	2005	101
	Notes: Dale Ring Co (1904–1920); Dale Mill Ltd. (1920–1957); Smith and Nephew (1957–1958)				
Dicken Green Mill		Rochdale SD 901119 53°36′14″N 2°09′04″W			
	Notes:				
Dope Street Mills		Rochdale			
Drydock Mill		Rochdale , SD927161 53°38′28″N 2°06′43″W			
Dunlop Mill		Castleton, Rochdale , SD886851 53°36′04″N 2°10′16″W	1913		101

== E to G ==
Name	Architect	Location	Built	Demolished	Served (Years)
Eclipse Mill		Rochdale SD 908,139 53°37′19″N 2°08′28″W			
	Notes: Five storeys, 41 by 14 bays. Ornamental water tower				
Ealees Mill		Rochdale , SD942162 53°38′31″N 2°05′20″W			
Ellenroad Mill		Newhey, Milnrow, Rochdale SD930116 53°36′04″N 2°06′25″W	1890	1982	92
	Notes: Five storey fireproof mule mill, brick 40 bays by 18, corner turrets, 3 projecting towers on south front. Damaged by fire in 1916. Rebuilt for ring.Triple expansion horizontal by J & W McNaught, rebuilt by Clayton, Goodfellow as twin tandem 1916. 23.5 in and 43.75 diameter. Corliss valves on high pressure. 28ft rope cylinder. The mill itself is no longer standing, but the engine house, boiler house and chimney still are complete, with the steam engine which is maintained and steamed once a month by the Ellenroad Trust.(in 1982)				
Ensor Mill		Queensway; Rochdale SD 888,111 53°35′48″N 2°10′17″W	1908		117
	Notes: Engine named 'Clara'. a 750hp cross compound engine by Yates and Thom, 1915. 21"HP, 39"LP X 4ft stroke, operating on 160psi, at 73rpm. 21ft flywheel, 21 ropes. Corliss valves on both cylinders. Air pump drive from tail rod. And also a 750hp tandem compound engine by Sharples [Barrow in Furness?], 1908. 19"HP, 40"LP X 4ft stroke. Operating on 160psi, at 72 ½ rpm. 22ft flywheel, 17 ropes. Corliss valves on both cylinders. Air pump drive from crosshead. New Corliss gear and Lumb governors to both engines instead of Dobson's motion.				
Facit Mill		Whitworth; Rochdale SD 888,189 53°39′58″N 2°10′16″W		2012	
	Notes:				
Fieldhouse Mill		Whitworth Road; Rochdale SD 897,146 53°37′41″N 2°09′25″W			
	Notes: Earlier mill was four storey, brick, rectangular windows stone sills and lintel. Later mill, three storey with stone decorated water tower: own branch line to Rochdale to Bacup line of Lancashire and Yorkshire Railway 1870. By 1971 one mill was disused and partially demolished, but Bright's continued to use the other mill (with stack). Bright's were always regarded as a good firm to work for – they provided, for instance, a creche where babies and small children could be looked after while their mothers were at work.				
Flat Mill		Rochdale			
Garfield		Milnrow, Rochdale	1884	1968	84
Grange Mill (part of)		Rochdale			
Green Grove Mill		Rochdale			

== H to L ==
Name	Architect	Location	Built	Demolished	Served (Years)
Hanging Lane		Rochdale	1791		234
	Notes: Opened in 1791, Rochdale's first steam-powered mill				
Harp		Rochdale			
Hollings Mill		Rochdale , SD952139 53°37′19″N 2°04′26″W			
Howard		Rochdale , SD936113 53°35′53″N 2°05′53″W			
Ladyhouse Mill		Milnrow, Rochdale	1877		148
Ladyhouse Mill		Milnrow, Rochdale SD931123	1879		146
	Notes: Bales of cotton, the first from Mexico, were blamed for a small smallpox outbreak 30 May 1914, affecting blowing room operatives, and others. The mill was described as having 2 bale breakers, 2 blowing room operatives, 4 cardroom jobbers, 2 can breakers, 4 drawing room (tenter)s and 4 assistants,4 slubbers and 4 assistant slubbers, 6 intermediate roving frame tenters, 8 roving frame tenters and 90 ring room operatives. New Ladyhouse mill was the first ring spinning mill established in 1879. Palm Mill was built in 1884, then Burns ring spinning, Heywood in 1891 and Nile (Oldham) and Era (Rochdale)in 1898. Ring spinning was more labour intensive working a 1:79 spindle to operative ratio.				
Len Vale Mill		Rochdale			
Linden Mill		Rochdale , Queensway OL11 2PQ			
Lower Two Bridge Mill		Rochdale , SD936113 53°35′53″N 2°05′53″W			
Lydgate Mill		Rochdale			
Unity Mill		Rochdale , SD846101 53°35′13″N 2°14′02″W			

== M to N ==
Name	Architect	Location	Built	Demolished	Served (Years)
Malta Mill	F.W.Dixon	Middleton 53°32′56″N 2°10′08″W	1905		120
	Notes:				
Manchester Old Road Works		Rochdale			
Marland Mill		Rochdale SD 877,111 53°35′46″N 2°11′13″W			
	Notes: engine house is likely to have housed an inverted vertical.				
Mars Mill		Rochdale SD 877,111 53°35′46″N 2°11′13″W	1906	demolished	
	Notes: Mars was built 1906 and the engine house is for a horizontal layout. Mars is demolished.				
Martin's Mill		Rochdale , SD8661 54°02′N 2°13′W	c.1850	1989	
Mayfield Mill		Rochdale , SD908141 53°37′27″N 2°08′20″W			
Millers Brook Mill		Heywood; Rochdale SD 858,109 53°35′38″N 2°12′58″W			
	Notes: Known locally as the Mop Shop.				
Milnrow		Rochdale SD 928,126 53°36′36″N 2°06′36″W		1992	
	Notes: Fire in 1992, re-built, with only the front of the original building remaining.				
Moss Mill		Rochdale SD908124 53°36′29″N 2°08′28″W			
	Notes:				
Mutual Mills No 1		Rochdale SD 861,111 53°35′46″N 2°12′40″W			
	Notes:				
Mutual Mills No 2		Rochdale SD 861,111 53°35′46″N 2°12′40″W			
	Notes:				
Mutual Mills No 3		Rochdale SD 862,111 53°35′46″N 2°12′36″W			
	Notes: Heywood. Dated 1914 although not completed until 1923.				
Nathan		Rochdale			
New Hey Mill		Rochdale			
Norden Mill		Rochdale			

== O to P ==
Name	Architect	Location	Built	Demolished	Served (Years)
Oakenrod Mills		Rochdale SD 888,131 53°36′50″N 2°10′16″W			
	Notes: Fulling Mill on River Roch, Woollen mill in 1848. Three storeys, Stone built.				
Oxford Mill		Rochdale			
Park Mill		Rochdale			
Passmonds Mill		Rochdale			
Phoenix Mill		Rochdale			
Portland Works		Rochdale , SD 88?713			
Pye Mill		Rochdale			

== R to S ==
Name	Architect	Location	Built	Demolished	Served (Years)
Rakewood Mill		Rochdale			
Red Lumb Mill		Rochdale 53°38′11″N 2°14′22″W			
	Notes: Converted to residential use as "The Meadows"				
Regent Mill		Rochdale			
Riverside Mill		Rochdale 53°37′48″N 2°07′44″W			
	Notes:				
Roch Mill		Sudden, Rochdale SD 883,124 53°42′29″N 2°10′41″W			
	Notes: Flour Mill on River Roch, O.S map 1:10560 1851. Watermill: the leat ran across the present sewage farm.				
Rock Nook Mill		Rochdale SD 947,179 53°39′29″N 2°04′55″W			
	Notes:				
Simpson Clough Mill		Rochdale SD 953,121 53°36′18″N 2°04′23″W			
	Notes: Site in the Cheesden brook valley on the site of a fulling mill, in 1982 it was a paper mill.				
Sladen Mill		Rochdale			
Sladen Wood Mill		Rochdale 53°39′36″N 2°04′58″W			
	Notes:				
Sparth Mill		Rochdale			
Spotland Bridge New Mill		Rochdale			
Standard Mill		Rochdale	1889		136
State		Rochdale SD 909,124 53°36′29″N 2°08′20″W			
	Notes:				

== T ==
Name	Architect	Location	Built	Demolished	Served (Years)
Town House Shed Mill		Rochdale			
Town House Mill		Rochdale , SD93S'73			
Trafalgar Mill		Rochdale , SD90			
Trafalgar Mill		Rochdale , SD924133 53°36′58″N 2°06′58″W			
Trows Fulling Mill		Rochdale			
Trows Upper Works		Rochdale			
Twin Mill		Rochdale , SD862119 53°36′11″N 2°12′36″W			
Two Bridge Mill		Rochdale			
Two Bridges Mill		Rochdale			
Two Bridges Mill		Rochdale			
Tyne Mill		Rochdale , SD933163 53°38′35″N 2°06′11″W			

== U to V ==
Name	Architect	Location	Built	Demolished	Served (Years)
Union Mill		Rochdale , SD892118 53°36′11″N 2°09′54″W			
Union Ring Mill		Rochdale , SD892118 53°36′11″N 2°09′54″W			
Vale Mill		Shaw, Rochdale , SD863106 53°35′31″N 2°12′29″W			
Vale Mill		Rochdale , SD901135 53°37′05″N 2°09′04″W			
Vale Mills		Rochdale , SD906142 53°37′26″N 2°08′38″W			
Valley Ring Mill		Rochdale , SD892117 53°36′07″N 2°09′54″W			
Victoria Mill		Rochdale SD863102 53°35′17″N 2°12′29″W			
	Notes:				
Victoria Mill		Rochdale , SD905123 53°36′25″N 2°08′42″W			

== W to Z ==
Name	Architect	Location	Built	Demolished	Served (Years)
Warwick Mill		Middleton SD872057 53°32′53″N 2°11′42″W			
	Notes:				
Wardle Mill		Rochdale , SD911171 53°39′00″N 2°08′10″W			
Wasp Mill		Rochdale , SD913167 53°38′49″N 2°07′59″W			
Wellfield Mill		Rochdale , SD904124 53°36′29″N 2°08′49″W			
White Lees Mill		Rochdale , SD933165 53°38′42″N 2°06′11″W			
Willow Street Mill		Rochdale , SD858109 53°35′38″N 2°12′58″W			
Woodfield Mill		Rochdale , SD859110 53°35′42″N 2°12′54″W			
Woodhouse Mills		Rochdale , SD857147 53°37′44″N 2°13′05″W			
Yew Vale Mill		Rochdale , SD901136 53°37′08″N 2°09′04″W			
Yew Vale Mill		Rochdale SD906142 53°37′26″N 2°08′38″W			
	Notes: Woollen				

== See also ==
- List of mills in Shaw and Crompton
