= Ellenroad Ring Mill Engine =

Preserved stationary steam engine in England

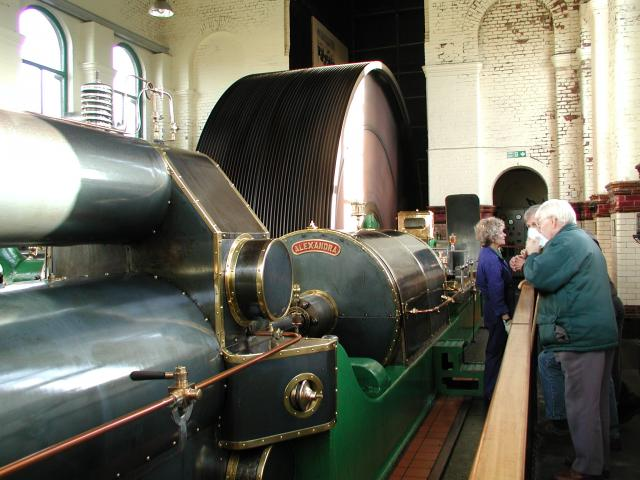
Alexandra, one of the twin preserved steam engines showing the rope drive flywheel

The Ellenroad Ring Mill Engine is a preserved stationary steam engine in Newhey, Greater Manchester, England. It powered the Ellenroad Ring Mill from 1917, and after the mill's closure the engine is still worked under steam as a museum display.

At 3000 hp, the twin tandem compound steam engine is possibly the most powerful of the type in preservation. The two engines are named Victoria and Alexandra, multiple ropes around the flywheel drove the line shafts on each floor of the mill which in turn drove the ring spinning frames.

The Ellenroad Ring Mill Engine in operation in September 2023

In addition to the mill engine, the museum also houses in operational condition the original Ellenroad mill pilot generator engine and sprinkler pump, the Whitelees Beam Engine, and the Irene Engine. The museum trust also owns the surviving components of the Fern Mill Engine, which it hopes eventually to restore to working condition.

Name	Architect	Location	Built	Demolished	Served (Years)
Ellenroad Mill	Stott and Sons	Newhey, Milnrow, Rochdale SD930116 53°36′04″N 2°06′25″W	1890	1982	92
	Notes: Five storey fireproof mule mill, brick 40 bays by 18, corner turrets, 3 projecting towers on south front. Damaged by fire in 1916. Rebuilt for ring. Triple expansion horizontal by J & W McNaught, rebuilt as twin tandem 1916, cylinders 23.5 in (60 cm) and 43.75 in (111.1 cm) diameter. Corliss valves on high pressure. 28 ft (8.5 m) rope cylinder. The mill itself is no longer standing, but the engine house, boiler house and chimney still are complete, with the steam engine which is maintained and steamed once a month by the Ellenroad Trust.				

== See also ==
- List of mills in Lancashire
- List of mills in Rochdale
- List of mills in Oldham
