= Royton Ring Mill, Royton =

Cotton mill in Greater Manchester, England

Royton Ring Mill
- The mill before 1951

- Location in Greater Manchester

Spinning (ring & doubling mill)
- Location: Royton, Greater Manchester, England
- Further ownership: Lancashire Cotton Corporation (1935); Courtaulds (1964)
- Coordinates: 53.5546°N 2.1191°W

Construction
- Completed: 1908
- Renovated: 1912 (expanded)

Design team
- Architecture Firm: P.S.Stott

Power
- Engine maker: Urmson & Thompson
- Engine type: cross compound engine
- Valve Gear: Corliss valves
- Cylinder diameter and throw: 29"HP, 59"LP X 5ft stroke
- rpm: 67
- Installed horse power (ihp): 1700
- Flywheel diameter: 24ft
- Transmission type: rope
- No. of ropes: 36

Boiler configuration
- Pressure: 160psi

Equipment
- Ring Frames path: 64,176 spindles
- Doublers: 6,400 spindles

Royton Ring Mill was a cotton mill in Royton, Greater Manchester, England. It was built in 1908 and extended in 1912. It was taken over by the Lancashire Cotton Corporation in 1935 and passed to Courtaulds in 1964. Production finished in 1966. It was extended again in 1969 and used for other purposes. It has now been demolished, the street has been renamed and houses have replaced it.

== Location ==
Royton is a town within the Metropolitan Borough of Oldham, in Greater Manchester, England. It lies by the source of the River Irk, on undulating land at the foothills of the Pennines, 1.7 miles (2.7 km) north-northwest of Oldham, 3.2 miles (5.1 km) south-southeast of Rochdale and 7.6 miles (12.2 km) northeast of the city of Manchester. Royton is not situated on any canal, but the Manchester, Oldham, and Royton railway (which left the Oldham Loop Line at Royton Junction railway station) and a goods yard were constructed in the 1860s, allowing improved transportation of textile goods and raw materials to and from the township.

== History ==
Historically a part of Lancashire, Royton during the Middle Ages, formed a small township centred on Royton Hall. A settlement expanded outwards from the hall which, by as late as 1780, "contained only a few straggling and mean-built cottages". Farming was the main industry of this rural area, with locals supplementing their incomes with hand-loom woolen weaving in the domestic system.

Royton has the distinction of being the first town in Lancashire where a water powered cotton mill was built. Thorp Mill, Royton was built by Ralph Taylor at Thorp Clough in 1764. The construction of more mills followed, which initiated a process of urbanisation and socioeconomic transformation in the region; the population moved away from farming, adopting employment in the factory system. The introduction of which led to a tenfold increase of Royton's population in less than a century; from 260 in 1714 to 2,719 in 1810. Thus, the introduction of textile manufacture during the Industrial Revolution facilitated a process of unplanned urbanisation in the area, and by the mid-19th century Royton had emerged as a mill town.

Royton's damp climate provided the ideal conditions for cotton spinning to be carried out without the cotton drying and breaking. By 1832, there were 12 steam powered mills in Royton, of which its former hamlets had begun to agglomerate as a town around the cotton factories, a number of small coalpits and a new turnpike road from Oldham to Rochdale, which passed through the town centre. The Manchester, Oldham, and Royton railway and a goods yard were constructed in the 1860s, allowing improved transportation of textile goods and raw materials to and from the township. Neighbouring Oldham (which by the 1870s had emerged as one of the largest and most productive mill towns in the world) had begun to encroach upon Royton's southern boundary, forming a continuous urban cotton-spinning district. The demand for cheap cotton goods from this area prompted the flotation of cotton spinning companies; the investment was followed by the construction of 22 new cotton mills in Royton. Together with Oldham, at its peak the area was responsible for 13% of the world's cotton production.

The industry peaked in 1912 when it produced 8 billion yards of cloth. The Great War of 1914–18 halted the supply of raw cotton, and the British government encouraged its colonies to build mills to spin and weave cotton. The war was over, and Lancashire never regained its markets. The independent mills were struggling. The Bank of England set up the Lancashire Cotton Corporation in 1929 to attempt to rationalise and save the industry. Royton Ring Mill, Royton was one of 104 mills bought by the LCC, and one of the 53 mills that survived through to 1950.

As imports of cheaper foreign yarns increased during the mid-20th century, Royton's textile sector declined gradually to a halt; cotton spinning reduced in the 1960s and 1970s, and by the early 1980s only four mills were operational. In spite of efforts to increase the efficiency and competitiveness of its production, the last cotton was spun in the town in 1998.

Today, fewer than a dozen mills are still standing in Royton, the majority of which are used for light engineering or as distribution centres. Despite an economic depression brought about by the demise of cotton spinning, Royton's population has continued to grow as a result of intensive housing redevelopment which has modernised its former Edwardian districts.

== Architecture ==
This was a P.S.Stott mill constructed in 1908.

=== Power ===
Driven by a 1700 hp cross compound engine by Urmson & Thompson, 1908 similar to the one in Mars Mill, Castleton. It was steamed at 160psi. The cylinders, 29"HP, 59"LP, had a 5-foot stroke. There were Corliss valves on both cylinders. The air pump was driven from LP tail rod with support guides on LP only. The 24-foot flywheel ran at 67 rpm and supported 36 ropes.

=== Equipment ===
In 1915 it had 64,176 ring and 6400 doubling spindles.

=== Later extensions ===
- 1912
- 1937

== Owners ==
- Lancashire Cotton Corporation (1935–1964)
- Courtaulds (1964–1966)
- Thomas Hope Ltd

== See also ==
- Textile manufacturing
- Cotton Mill
- History of Oldham

== Bibliography ==
- Dunkerley, Philip (2009). "Dunkerley-Tuson Family Website, The Regent Cotton Mill, Failsworth". Archived from the original on 23 March 2008.
- LCC (1951). The mills and organisation of the Lancashire Cotton Corporation Limited. Blackfriars House, Manchester: Lancashire Cotton Corporation Limited.
- Roberts, A S (1921), "Arthur Robert's Engine List", Arthur Roberts Black Book., One guy from Barlick-Book Transcription, archived from the original on 23 July 2011
- Brownbill, John; Farrer, William (1911), A History of the County of Lancaster: Volume 5, Victoria County History, ISBN 978-0-7129-1055-2
- Frangopulo, N. J. (1977), Tradition in Action: The Historical Evolution of the Greater Manchester County, Wakefield: EP, ISBN 0-7158-1203-3
- Gurr, Duncan; Hunt, Julian (1985). The Cotton Mills of Oldham. Oldham Education & Leisure. ISBN 0-902809-46-6. Archived from the original on 18 July 2011.
- McNeil, R & Nevell, M (2000), A Guide to the Industrial Archaeology of Greater Manchester, Association for Industrial Archaeology, ISBN 0-9528930-3-7
- Stott, Frances (1994), Looking Back at Royton, Oldham: Oldham Arts and Heritage, ISBN 0-902809-29-6
