= Urmson =

Urmson is a surname. Notable people with the surname include:

- Chris Urmson, Canadian engineer, academic, and entrepreneur
- Fred Urmson (1907–1985), English footballer
- J. O. Urmson (1915–2012), British philosopher and classicist

== See also ==
- Urmson & Thompson, a defunct steam engine manufacturing company
