= Listed buildings in Milnrow =

Milnrow is a town in the Metropolitan Borough of Rochdale, Greater Manchester, England, and it is unparished. The town, with its suburb of Newhey and the surrounding countryside, contains 49 listed buildings that are recorded in the National Heritage List for England. Of these, three are listed at Grade II*, the middle grade, and the others are at Grade II, the lowest grade. Until the Industrial Revolution the area was rural and agricultural and most of the earlier listed buildings are houses and associated structures, farmhouses and farm buildings. When the textile industry arrived, it was initially carried out in domestic premises, and many of the listed buildings of this time are houses, often with three storeys and rows of multi-light mullioned weavers' workshop windows on the upper floors. Later came mills, one of which has survived and is listed. The other listed buildings include a public house, a bridge, churches and items in churchyards, a library and a war memorial.

== Key ==
Grade	Criteria
II*	Particularly important buildings of more than special interest
II	Buildings of national importance and special interest

== Buildings ==
Name and location	Photograph	Date	Notes	Grade
Rough Bank Farmhouse; 53.60740°N 2.08128°W		1607	The farmhouse is in stone with quoins, and has a slate roof with coped gables. There are two storeys and three bays. The gabled porch has a chamfered surround, an elliptical head and a dated lintel, and the inner door has an ogee-arched lintel. Most of the windows are mullioned with hood moulds. Inside there is an inglenook and a bressumer.	II*
Clegg Hall; 53.62691°N 2.11881°W		c. 1610	A country house in stone on a projecting plinth that has a stone-slate roof with coped gables. It has a double-pile plan, two storeys, a basement and attics, an entrance front of five bays, three bays on the sides, and three gables on each front. Steps flanked by walls lead up to the central two-storey porch that has a segmental-headed doorway. The upper floor is jettied above an entablature, and has flanking columns with enriched capitals and a frieze. The windows are mullioned or mullioned and transomed, and have hood moulds, that on the upper floor being continuous.	II*
Birchinley Hall Farmhouse; 53.62085°N 2.10691°W	—	1619	The farmhouse is in stone with quoins and a stone-slate roof. It has two storeys and three bays, the outer bays projecting as cross-wings. In the left cross-wing is a porch that has chamfered inner and outer doorways and contains seats. The outer doorway has an elliptical head and an inscribed and dated lintel with recessed spandrels. The windows are mullioned, and most have hood moulds. Inside the farmhouse is an inglenook and a bressumer.	II
Bradley's Farmhouse; 53.60355°N 2.09486°W	—	1619	The farmhouse, which was altered in the 18th century, is in stone with quoins and a slate roof. There are two storeys, three bays, and a small right wing with a lean-to garage. On the front is a gabled porch, and the doorway has a chamfered surround and an obtuse-angled lintel. There is another doorway with a square-cut surround, and the windows are mullioned.	II
Shippon, Carr Farm; 53.61169°N 2.08523°W	—	1622	A farmhouse, later a shippon, in stone on a projecting plinth and with a stone-slate roof. It has two storeys, two bays, and a timber lean-to extension on the right. Above the door is a dated and initialled lintel, and the windows are mullioned, with hood moulds above the ground floor windows. Inside the building is an inglenook and a bressumer.	II
Ashes Farmhouse; 53.61457°N 2.11449°W	—	Early 17th century	A farmhouse and cottage in stone with a stone-slate roof that has a left coped gable. It has two storeys and three bays. There are two doorways, one with a hood mould and the other with a flat hood. The windows are mullioned, and inside the house are timber framed walls.	II
Burnedge Farmhouse; 53.59103°N 2.12135°W	—	Early 17th century	The farmhouse is in stone with a stone-slate roof. There are two storeys, three bays, a cart entry to the right, and a small rear wing. To the left is a porch with chamfered doorway surrounds, the inner doorway has an obtuse-angled lintel, and the roof has a coped gable. Most of the windows are mullioned, and inside the farmhouse is an inglenook and a bressumer.	II
Lower Crow Nest Farmhouse; 53.61627°N 2.09860°W	—	Early 17th century (possible)	The farmhouse was altered and extended in the 19th century, and is in stone, partly rendered, with a slate roof. The original part has a cross-wing and a two-storey porch with quoins, a doorway with a moulded surround and a Tudor arched lintel, and above is a hood mould, an inscribed tablet, and a coped gable. Most windows are mullioned, one is mullioned and transomed, and there is a stair window with two transoms.	II
Birchinley Manor Farmhouse; 53.62050°N 2.10722°W	—	1631	The house has a U-shaped plan, the longer right wing being rebuilt in 1973. It is in stone with quoins and has a stone-slate roof with gargoyles and coped gables with finials at the rear. There are two storeys and three bays. The left wing contains a recessed porch with seats, a doorway with a chamfered surround and a Tudor arched head. The windows are mullioned, and there is a continuous hood mould above the ground floor.	II*
Knott Booth Farmhouse and barn 53.59291°N 2.11800°W	—	Mid-17th century	The farmhouse and barn are in stone with a stone-slate roof. The house has two storeys and two bays, with the right bay slightly projecting. Most windows are mullioned, and there is a continuous hood mould above the ground floor windows. The barn to the right dates from the 18th century, and contains a semicircular-headed cart entry and an opposite winnowing door.	II
Lowhouse Cottage; 53.61521°N 2.10252°W	—	Mid-17th century	A stone house on a projecting plinth, with quoins and a roof of 20th-century tiles. It has two storeys and two bays. The doorway has a segmental-arched head and a chamfered surround, and there is a continuous hood mould above the ground floor, rising over the doorway. The windows are mullioned, including a twelve-light workshop window on the upper floor at the rear. In the left gable end is a three-light round-arched window, and in the gable is a circular opening.	II
Tithe Barn; 53.59880°N 2.13515°W	—	Mid-17th century (probable)	A house, and an attached barn that was added to the right in the 18th century and partly converted for residential use, in stone, mainly rendered, with roofs of slate and stone-slate. The house has two storeys and three bays. On the front is a two-storey porch that has a doorway with a moulded surround and an obtuse-angled lintel. Above the doorway is a two-light window with arched lights, formerly mullioned, and a coped gable with a ball finial. The other windows and the openings in the barn have been altered.	II
Wild House Farmhouse and 1 and 2 Olde Wylde House Cottages; 53.61898°N 2.11157°W	—	Mid-17th century (probable)	Originally one house with two cross-wings, later divided into three cottages, it is in rendered stone with quoins and a stone-slate roof and two storeys. At the rear the windows are mullioned, with hood moulds over the ground floor windows. On the front are some mullioned windows, but most are 20th-century replacements, as is the doorway.	II
Broad Shaw Farmhouse and barn 53.59680°N 2.12586°W	—	1651	The farmhouse and barn are in stone with quoins and a stone-slate roof. There are two storeys, three bays and a rear wing, formerly a separate dwelling, which includes a barn. The doorway has a chamfered surround, an initialled and dated lintel, and an obtuse-angled head with recessed spandrels. The windows are mullioned, and in the barn is a round-headed cart entry. Inside the farmhouse is a timber framed cross wall.	II
Higher Ogden Cottages (two northern bays); 53.60533°N 2.06849°W	—	1660	The former house is in stone on a projecting plinth, with quoins and a roof partly of slate and partly of stone-slate. There are two storeys and two bays, the left bay projecting forward. On the front is a blocked doorway with an obtuse-angled initialled and dated lintel with recessed spandrels. The windows are mullioned with hood moulds above the ground floor windows, and windows on the upper floor have been converted into dormers.	II
Moorgate East Farmhouse and 3 Broad Lane; 53.59038°N 2.12244°W	—	1663	The farmhouse is in stone, rendered at the rear, and has a slate roof. The original house has two storeys and two bays, there is a later cross-wing to the left, and a single-story extension further to the left. The single-storey porch has a chamfered doorway with an obtuse-angled initialled and dated lintel, above which is a stone-slate roof with a coped gable and a ball finial. The cross-wing also has a doorway with a chamfered surround and an initialled and dated lintel that has recessed spandrels. The windows are mullioned.	II
The Castle; 53.60510°N 2.07041°W	—	Late 17th century (probable)	A farmhouse, later a private house, it is stone on a projecting plinth, with quoins and a stone-slate roof with coped gables. There are two storeys, three bays, a single-storey rear lean-to extension, an extension at the rear right, and a small wing. The gabled porch has a moulded surround and an obtuse-angled lintel with recessed spandrels. Most of the windows are mullioned, there is a continuous hood mould, and in the right return is a bow window.	II
Dixon Green Farmhouse, barn and 5 Dixon Green; 53.60472°N 2.12452°W	—	1685	A farmhouse incorporating a cottage and a barn, they are in stone on a projecting plinth, with quoins and a stone-slate roof. There are two storeys and a total of three bays, with a small rear extension. Above the door is an initialled and dated lintel, and the windows are mullioned. The barn to the left has opposed cart entries, one of which is blocked, and a rear outshut.	II
Garside Farmhouse; 53.59714°N 2.11520°W	—	1697	The farmhouse was considerably altered in the 20th century. It is a long two-storey building in stone and has a 20th-century tiled roof. The main feature is the single-storey porch which has an embattled parapet with ball finials and a gargoyle. The doorway has a moulded surround and an initialled and dated lintel, and above it is a cornice band. There are seats inside the porch with squints. To the left is a mullioned window with a hood mould, and the rest of the house dates from the 20th century.	II
7 and 8 Top o' th' Hill Cottages; 53.59729°N 2.08534°W	—	Late 17th to early 18th century	Originally one house, later two cottages, in stone with a slate roof, two storeys and two bays. The original central doorway has a chamfered surround, and has been blocked, and two later doorways have been inserted. Most of the windows are mullioned.	II
Barn adjacent to Birchinley Hall Farmhouse; 53.62081°N 2.10653°W	—	Late 17th to early 18th century	The barn is in stone with a stone-slate roof, five bays, an outshut at the rear, and another outshut with quoins to the left of the blocked cart entry that has a timber lintel. There are three doorways with square-cut surrounds.	II
Barns east of Birchinley Manor Farmhouse; 53.62055°N 2.10699°W	—	Late 17th to early 18th century	Two barns, the later dated 1832, they are in stone with quoins and have roofs of stone-slate and corrugated asbestos. The earlier barn is long, and has opposed elliptical-headed cart entries with chamfered surrounds and carved heads on the springing stones, two doorways with chamfered surrounds, one with a Tudor arched lintel, a mullioned window, a loft hatch, and coped gables. The other barn is wider and shorter and fills the gaps between the farmhouse and the earlier barn. It has three doors, vents and loft hatches.	II
2, 4 and 6 Bridge Street; 53.61159°N 2.11304°W	—	1725	Originally a chapel rebuilt on the site of an earlier chapel, and later converted into three cottages, it is in stone, partly rendered at the rear, with quoins and a stone-slate roof. There are two storeys and three bays. The central doorway has a segmental head, Ionic columns, a moulded surround, and a pediment with a central shield. The other doorways have square-cut surrounds, and the windows are mullioned.	II
Holly Cottage and 5 Lane Bottom; 53.60505°N 2.07131°W	—	Early 18th century	The house and cottage are in stone with quoins and a stone-slate roof, and both have a double-depth plan and two storeys. The house has two bays and a central porch. The windows on the upper floor are mullioned; on the ground floor they have been replaced by larger windows, and have hood moulds. The cottage attached to the left has one bay and contains a doorway with a square-cut surround and inserted casement windows.	II
The Barn Tea Shop and The Barn; 53.60513°N 2.07073°W	—	Early 18th century	The house and the barn, which has been converted for residential use, are in stone on a projecting plinth, with quoins and a stone-slate roof. The house has two storeys and two bays, and the barn is at right angles. The windows are mullioned, in the barn are blocked opposing cart entries, outshuts, and inserted dormer windows.	II
Barn, Rough Bank Farm; 53.60767°N 2.08105°W	—	18th century	The barn is in stone with quoins and a stone-slate roof, and contains remnants of a timber framed building dating probably from the 17th century. It has four bays, and contains opposing cart entries. On the front are shippon doors, and at the rear is a round-headed cart entry.	II
Brick-built house, Chadwick Fold; 53.59388°N 2.12801°W	—	Mid-18th century	A brick house with quoins, stone dressings and a stone-slate roof. There are two storeys and two bays. The doorway has a dressed surround, and the windows are mullioned.	II
6 and 8 Wild House Lane; 53.61435°N 2.10879°W	—	Late 18th century	A pair of stone cottages with a stone-slate roof. They have a double-depth plan two storeys and one bay each. The doorways have square-cut surrounds, and the windows are mullioned.	II
49 and 51 Dale Street; 53.61033°N 2.11062°W	—	Late 18th century	A pair of houses with stone at the front, brick at the rear, and a stone-slate roof. They have a double-depth plan, two storeys, and each house has one bay. The doorways are on the right, they are approached by steps, and have square-cut surrounds. The windows are mullioned, some of them at the rear containing casements.	II
244 Harbour Lane; 53.60453°N 2.10993°W	—	Late 18th century	A stone house with a stone-slate roof, a double-depth plan, three storeys, and one bay. The doorway has a square-cut surround, the windows are mullioned, and there is a blocked taking-in door in the right return.	II
266 Rochdale Road; 53.61627°N 2.12632°W	—	Late 18th century	A stone house with square eaves gutter brackets and a roof partly of slate and part of stone-slate. It has a single-depth plan, three storeys and one bay. The doorway has a square-cut surround, and the windows are mullioned, including six-light workshop windows on the upper two floors.	II
Moorhouse Farmhouse; 53.61219°N 2.11762°W	—	Late 18th century	A stone farmhouse with quoins, a sill band, and a stone-slate roof. It has a double-depth plan, two storeys and two bays. There is a central doorway with a square-cut surround, and the windows are mullioned, including a ten-light workshop window on the upper floor.	II
Top o'th'Hill Farmhouse and 9 Top o'th Hill Cottages; 53.59718°N 2.08515°W	—	Late 18th century	The farmhouse and cottage are in stone with an eaves cornice and slate roofs. They have a double-depth plan, two storeys and a total of three bays. The house has a symmetrical front and a central doorway, and the cottage has a lower roofline. The windows in both parts are mullioned.	II
Cherry Tree Cottage; 53.59708°N 2.08488°W	—	1777	A stone house with quoins, and with a roof of stone-slate at the front and slate at the rear. It has a double-depth plan, two storeys and two bays. The doorway has a dressed surround, the windows are mullioned, and between the upper floor windows is a datestone.	II
Silver Hill Farmhouse; 53.59817°N 2.13518°W	—	1789	A stone farmhouse with a slate roof, two storeys with a basement, and three bays. Steps lead up to a doorway with a square-cut surround and a fanlight. On the ground floor are rectangular windows, and the upper floor contains mullioned windows.	II
The Bobbin public house and adjacent takeaway restaurant 53.61123°N 2.11242°W		1790	A public house and attached shop in stone with quoins, an eaves cornice, and a slate roof. There are three storeys and four bays, a shop window in the first bay, and a doorway in the third bay with a moulded surround and a cornice. The windows are sashes, some with mullions. The rear is partly rendered and has a mullioned and transomed window.	II
Belfield Bridge; 53.62210°N 2.12707°W		Between 1794 and 1804	The bridge is No. 56 over the Rochdale Canal, and carries Belfield Mill Lane over the canal. It is in stone, and consists of a single elliptical skew arch, and has a band, a keystone, and a parapet with rounded coping.	II
Clegg Hall Cottages; 53.62689°N 2.11925°W		Late 18th to early 19th century	Originally eight back-to-back houses, later converted into four cottages, they are in stone with quoins and a stone-slate roof. The houses have three storeys and one bay each, the doorways have square-cut surrounds, and the windows are mullioned, those on the top floor being multi-light workshop windows.	II
Shore family tomb 53.61180°N 2.10928°W	—	c. 1811	The chest tomb is in the churchyard of St James' Church. It is in stone, and the chest has rounded ends, rusticated panels, and has corner balusters carrying a slab. The slab has reeded edges, acanthus leaves on the corners, and it is inscribed with names of members of the Shore family.	II
25, 27 and 29 Charles Lane; 53.60803°N 2.10624°W	—	Early 19th century	A row of three stone houses with a stone-slate roof. They have a double-depth plan, three storeys, and all houses have one bay. Each house has a door on the right with a square-cut surround and a 20th-century casement window replacing a former sash window. On the upper floors are mullioned windows, including seven-light workshop windows on the top floor.	II
45 and 47 Dale Street; 53.61038°N 2.11077°W		Early 19th century	A pair of stone houses with quoins, bands between the floors, and a stone-slate roof. They have a double-depth plan, three storeys, and both houses have one bay. Each house has a door on the right with a square-cut surround, on the ground floor is a two-light sash window, and on the upper floors are four-light mullioned windows.	II
Barnards Cottages Farmhouse and barn 53.60211°N 2.08094°W	—	Early 19th century	Three cottages and a barn in stone with quoins and a stone-slate roof partly replaced by 20th-century tiles. The cottages have a double-depth plan, two storeys, and all have one bay. Each cottage has a doorway to the right with a square-cut surround, the windows are mullioned, and there is a small rear lean-to extension. The barn to the right has opposing cart entrances, a shippon door with a chamfered surround, and vents with arched heads.	II
Clegg Hall Mill; 53.62742°N 2.11839°W		Early 19th century	A complex of buildings of a textile mill of varying dates. The buildings include Clegg Hall House, a mill lodge, the remains of a mill building, a boiler house and chimney range, and a canal side range. The canal side range is in gritstone with quoins and has a hipped slate roof. There are three storeys on the canal side face and one or two on the sloping roadside face, and fronts of 13 and two bays.	II
Sundial; 53.61192°N 2.10907°W	—	Early 19th century	The sundial is in the churchyard of St James' Church. It is in stone, and consists of a decorated baluster-type shaft on a circular base. The dial and gnomon are missing.	II
St James' Church; 53.61224°N 2.10924°W		1868–69	The church was designed by G. E. Street in Gothic Revival style. It is in stone on a projecting plinth, and has a slate roof with coped gables with finials. The church consists of a nave with a clerestory, north and south aisles, a south porch, a chancel with a vestry and a chapel, and a west tower. The tower has two stages, an octagonal stair turret, a parapet under which is a band with ballflower decoration, gargoyles, and the tower surmounted by a small pyramidal roof. Inside, the capitals have foliage decoration by Thomas Earp.	II
Meeting room north of church 53.61222°N 2.10888°W	—	1872	The former meeting room is to the north of St James' Church. It is in stone and has a roof of stone-slate with coped gables. The building has a single storey and contains two rooms. There are two doorways with ogee-arched heads and a hood mould flanking a two-light window, and there is a two-light window in each gable end.	II
St Thomas' Church, New Hey; 53.60225°N 2.09607°W		1876–77	The church is in sandstone with dressings and spire in Bath stone, and a roof of green and purple slate with coped gables and cross finials and red tile cresting. It consists of a nave with a clerestory, north and south aisles, north and south transepts, a chancel with a vestry and organ chamber, and a southwest steeple. The steeple has a four-stage tower with diagonal buttresses, a south doorway with a crocketed triangular hood mould, a circular opening in the second stage, a decorative parapet with crocketed gritstone pinnacles, and a set-back broach spire with lucarnes and a weathercock.	II
Milnrow Carnegie Library and forecourt wall 53.60606°N 2.10462°W		1907–08	The library was built with a grant from Andrew Carnegie, and is in sandstone with Arts and Crafts and Art Nouveau features. There are two storeys and a front of two bays. In the left bay there is a Diocletian window on the ground floor with mullions and transoms, a keystone and a hood mould. On the upper floor is a canted oriel window and a carved coat of arms to the right. In the right bay is the entrance and a casement window under a segmental arch. On the upper floor is a mullioned and transomed window, and the bay is flanked by piers rising to columns between which at the top is a triangular pediment. In front of the library is a sandstone wall with railings, and has a gateway flanked by piers over which is an overthrow.	II
War memorial 53.60415°N 2.10209°W		c. 1920	The war memorial consists of a tall square tapering shaft in ashlar stone on which stands the bronze statue of a soldier holding a rifle. The names of those lost in the First World Wars are on the shaft, those lost in the Second World War are on the base, and there is an inscription on a stylobate.	II
