= The Bobbin, Milnrow =

Listed pub in Greater Manchester, England

The Bobbin
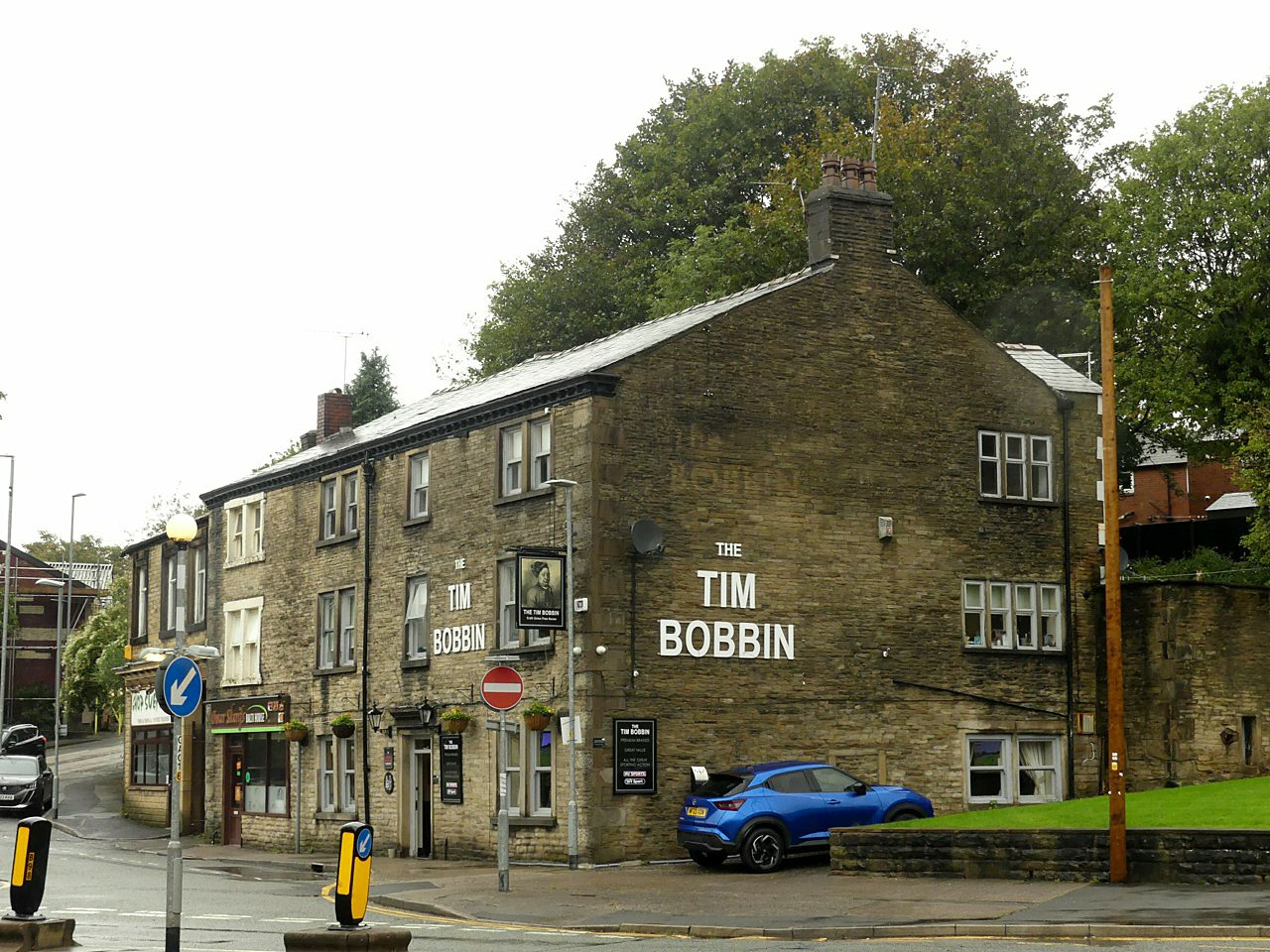
- The pub in 2023

- Location within Greater Manchester
- Alternative names: Tim Bobbin

General information
- Type: Public house
- Location: 3 Dale Street, Milnrow, Greater Manchester, England
- Coordinates: 53.6111°N 2.1124°W
- Year built: 1790; 236 years ago
- Owner: Stonegate

Design and construction
- Designations

Listed Building – Grade II
- Official name: The Bobbin public house and adjacent takeaway restaurant
- Designated: 24 January 1967
- Reference no.: 1162521

Website
- Official website

The Bobbin (now trading as the Tim Bobbin) is a Grade II listed public house on Dale Street in Milnrow, a town within the Metropolitan Borough of Rochdale, Greater Manchester, England. Built in 1790, it has a documented history as a pub from the late 19th century. It rebranded as the Tim Bobbin sometime before 2023, adopting the name of the Lancastrian poet Tim Bobbin, and as of 2025 the freehold was owned by Stonegate.

== History ==
The building was constructed in 1790, according to its official listing. The 1893 and 1930 Ordnance Survey maps record it as a public house, with no accompanying name.

On 24 January 1967, The Bobbin and the adjacent commercial premises was designated a Grade II listed building. At some point in or prior to April 2023, the pub rebranded as the Tim Bobbin, named after the Lancastrian poet Tim Bobbin; the precise date of the change is unclear, though Google Street View imagery confirms that it had taken place by then. As of 2025 it is run by Craft Union, a division of the Stonegate Pub Company.

== Architecture ==
The building is constructed in roughly finished stone and has a slate roof. It has two rooms in depth, four bays, and three storeys. The corners are strengthened with dressed stone. The first bay contains a shopfront. The third bay has the main doorway, framed by shaped stonework and a small projecting top. On the upper floors, bay three has single sash windows, while the other bays have paired sash windows set in plain stone surrounds with a central divider. There is a cornice at the eaves, and chimney stacks on both the ridge and the gable end. The gable and rear have flat‑faced mullioned windows; part of the rear wall is rendered and includes a stair window with both mullions and a transom.

== See also ==
- Listed buildings in Milnrow
- Listed pubs in Greater Manchester
