= Mars Mill, Castleton =

Cotton mill in Greater Manchester, England

Mars Mill
- The mill before 1951

- Location in Greater Manchester

Spinning (Fine Egyptianb)
- Location: Castleton, Rochdale, Greater Manchester, England.
- Serving canal: Rochdale Canal
- Serving railway: Lancashire and Yorkshire Railway
- Owner: Mars Mill Limited
- Further ownership: Lancashire Cotton Corporation (1935); Courtaulds (1964)
- Coordinates: 53.5969°N 2.1860°W

Power
- Date: 1908
- Engine maker: Urmson & Thompson
- Engine type: cross compound
- Valve Gear: Corliss valves
- Cylinder diameter and throw: 29" HP, 59" LP × 5-foot stroke.
- rpm: 67 rpm
- Installed horse power (ihp): 1700 hp
- Flywheel diameter: 24 ft
- No. of ropes: 36 ropes

Boiler configuration
- Pressure: 160 psi

Equipment
- Cotton count: 76 +
- Mule Frames: 115,630 mule spindles (1919)

Mars Mill was a former cotton spinning mill in Castleton, Rochdale, Greater Manchester, England. Castleton joined the Borough of Rochdale in 1899. Queensway, Castleton was a hub of cotton mills; Mars, Marland, and Castleton Mill were a group of three. It was taken over by the Lancashire Cotton Corporation in 1935 and passed to Courtaulds in 1964 and demolished in the 1990s; Marland survived until 2004.

== Location ==
Rochdale is a large market town in Greater Manchester, England. It lies amongst the foothills of the Pennines on the River Roch, 5.3 miles (8.5 km) north-northwest of Oldham, and 9.8 miles (15.8 km) north-northeast of the city of Manchester. Rochdale is surrounded by several smaller settlements which together form the Metropolitan Borough of Rochdale.Castleton lies to the south west, just north of Chadderton, it became part of Rochdale in 1899.

Castleton is served by the Rochdale Canal which officially opened in 1804. This provides a broad canal link across the Pennines and consequently became an important transport corridor. Within Greater Manchester, the canal started at the Bridgewater Canal, linked with Ashton Canal and passed through Ancoats, Droylsden, Moston, Middleton and Chadderton before passing Castleton and to the south of Rochdale towards Todmorden. The canal carried coal and cotton to the mills, and the completed yarn to the weaving sheds. In 1890 the canal company had 2,000 barges and traffic reached 700,000 tons/year, the equivalent of 50 barges a day, despite competition from the Manchester and Leeds Railway.

The rail service provided by the Manchester and Leeds Railway from 1839 had important goods yards at Castleton. It was amalgamated into the Lancashire and Yorkshire Railway in 1847; lines ran to Bury, Burnley, Oldham, Manchester and Leeds.

== History ==
It was a boomtown of the Industrial Revolution, and amongst the first ever industrialised towns. The Rochdale Canal—one of the major navigable broad canals of the United Kingdom—was a highway of commerce during this time used for the haulage of cotton, wool, coal to and from the area. In 1882, Rochdale, the home of industrial co-operatives, embraced the joint stock limited company and new mills were financed and built. Its ownership model was slightly different from that of Oldham, and more shares remained in the hands of the operatives. The canal created jobs for hundreds of local residents, as it enabled the construction of several cotton mills. With the mills came the need for engineering and from 1892, Castleton was the home of Tweedales and Smalley, who manufactured looms and textile machinery. Their 14-acre (5.7 ha) Globe Works factory no longer exists, now part of the Woolworth's site.

The Manchester and Leeds Railway Company (later the Lancashire and Yorkshire Railway) arrived in Castleton in 1839.

Mars Mill was a cotton mill built around 1906 by Mars Mill Limited. In 1913 the directors authorized the addition of another storey to the mill and did not pay a dividend, but made a small profit. In 1914 Mars Mill made a half-year loss of £4,486. By 1919 the independent mills were struggling. The shareholders agreed to a recommendation to sell the mill to Messrs. Cottam and Mellor, of Oldham, for £258,000; that is £12.15s for each of the 16,000 ordinary shares of £2.10s. and £1.2s 6d. for each of the £1 preference shares. A new company was floated. The Mars Mill (1920) Limited, was registered with a capital of £300,000 in £1 shares.

The Bank of England set up the Lancashire Cotton Corporation in 1929 to attempt to rationalise and save the industry. Mars Mill, Castleton was one of 104 mills bought by the LCC, and one of the 53 mills that survived through to 1950, when it was spinning the finest Egyptian cotton, producing combed quality yarns from Ring and mule in the range of 74 to 120s. It was demolished in the 1990s. The adjacent Marland Mill stood until 2004.

== Architecture ==
Standard Edwardian-style mill with a simple water tower. Detached engine house laid out for a horizontal cross compound. It had four storeys; a fifth storey was added in 1913/14 to accommodate an additional 30,000 spindles.

== Engine ==
Driven by a 1700 hp cross compound engine by Urmson & Thompson, 1908 similar to the one in Royton Ring Mill, Royton. Probably had a 24-foot flywheel running at 67 rpm with 36 ropes. The cylinders, 29"HP, 59"LP, had a 5 ft stroke. It had Corliss valves on both cylinders. The air pump was driven from LP tail rod with support guides on LP only.

=== Owners ===
- Mars Mill Limited (1906–19)
- Messrs. Cottam and Mellor, of Oldham (1919)
- Mars Mill (1920) Limited (1920–1930s)
- Lancashire Cotton Corporation (1935–1964)
- Courtaulds (1964–)

== See also ==
- Textile manufacturing

== Bibliography ==
- Dunkerley, Philip (2009). "Dunkerley-Tuson Family Website, The Regent Cotton Mill, Failsworth". Archived from the original on 23 March 2008.
- LCC (1951). The mills and organisation of the Lancashire Cotton Corporation Limited. Blackfriars House, Manchester: Lancashire Cotton Corporation Limited.
- Roberts, A S (1921), "Arthur Robert's Engine List", Arthur Roberts Black Book., One guy from Barlick-Book Transcription, archived from the original on 23 July 2011
- Williams, Mike; Farnie, Douglas Anthony (1992). Cotton Mills of Greater Manchester. Carnegie Publishing. ISBN 0-948789-69-7.
