= Harp Mill, Castleton =

Cotton mill in Greater Manchester, England

Harp Mill
- The mill before 1951

- Location in Greater Manchester

Spinning (ring mill)
- Location: Castleton, Rochdale, Greater Manchester, England
- Serving canal: Rochdale Canal
- Serving railway: Lancashire and Yorkshire Railway
- Owner: Harp Doubling Company
- Further ownership: Lancashire Cotton Corporation (1938); N. Corah (St. Margaret) Ltd. (1958)
- Coordinates: 53.5940°N 2.1730°W

Boiler configuration
- Boilers: Twin Lancashire, coal fired

Harp Mill was a former cotton spinning mill in the Castleton, Rochdale, Greater Manchester, England. Queensway, Castleton was a hub of cotton mills including the three 't', Th'Arrow, Th'Harp, and Th'Ensor. The 1908 Castleton map includes: Marland Cotton Mill, Castleton Cotton Mill, Globe Works (Textile Machinery), Arrow Cotton Mill, Harp Cotton Mill, Globe Leather Works, Castleton Size Works and Castleton Iron Works. Th'Harp was built in 1908 for the Harp Doubling Company and was taken over by the Lancashire Cotton Corporation in 1938. The mill closed in 1958, and was sold to the hosiery manufacturer N. Corah (St. Margaret) Ltd.

== Location ==
Rochdale is a large market town in Greater Manchester, England. It lies amongst the foothills of the Pennines on the River Roch, 5.3 miles (8.5 km) north-northwest of Oldham, and 9.8 miles (15.8 km) north-northeast of the city of Manchester. Rochdale is surrounded by several smaller settlements which together form the Metropolitan Borough of Rochdale. Castleton lies to the south west, just north of Chadderton, it became part of Rochdale in 1899.

Castleton is served by the Rochdale Canal which officially opened in 1804. This provides a broad canal link across the Pennines and consequent became an important transport corridor. Within Greater Manchester, the canal started at the Bridgewater Canal, linked with Ashton Canal and passed through Ancoats, Droylsden, Moston, Middleton and Chadderton before passing Castleton and to the south of Rochdale towards Todmorden. The canal carried coal and cotton to the mills, and the completed yarn to the weaving sheds. In 1890 the canal company had 2,000 barges and traffic reached 700,000 tons/year, the equivalent of 50 barges a day, in spite of competition from the Manchester and Leeds Railway.

The rail service provided by Manchester and Leeds Railway from 1839, had important goods yards at Castleton. It was amalgamated into the Lancashire and Yorkshire Railway in 1847, and lines ran to Bury, Burnley, Oldham, Manchester and Leeds.

== History ==
Rochdale was a boomtown of the Industrial Revolution, and amongst the first ever industrialised towns. The Rochdale Canal—one of the major navigable broad canals of the United Kingdom—was a highway of commerce during this time used for the haulage of cotton, wool, coal to and from the area. In 1882, Rochdale the home of industrial co-operatives, embraced the joint stock limited company and new mills were financed and built. Its ownership model was slightly different from that of Oldham, and more shares remained in the hands of the operatives. The canal granted jobs for hundreds of local residents, as it enabled the construction of several cotton mills. With the mills came the need for engineering and from 1892, Castleton was the home of Tweedales and Smalley who manufactured looms and textile machinery. Their 14-acre (5.7 ha) Globe Works factory no longer exists, being part of the Woolworth's site.

The Manchester and Leeds Railway Company (later the Lancashire and Yorkshire Railway) arrived in Castleton in 1839.

The industry peaked in 1912 when it produced 8 billion yards of cloth. The Great War of 1914–18 halted the supply of raw cotton, and the British government encouraged its colonies to build mills to spin and weave cotton. The war over, Lancashire never regained its markets. The independent mills were struggling. The Bank of England set up the Lancashire Cotton Corporation in 1929 to attempt to rationalise and save the industry. Harp Mill, Castleton was one of 104 mills bought by the LCC, and one of the 53 mills that survived through to 1950.

== Architecture ==
The Harp was a single-storey mill, with various sheds surrounding a central engine house. It was used for ring doubling.

=== Owners ===
- Harp Doubling Company (1908-1938)
- Lancashire Cotton Corporation (1938–1958)
- N. Corah (St. Margaret) Ltd. (1958- )

== See also ==
- Textile manufacturing
- List of mills in Rochdale

== Bibliography ==
- Dunkerley, Philip (2009). "Dunkerley-Tuson Family Website, The Regent Cotton Mill, Failsworth". Archived from the original on 23 March 2008.
- LCC (1951). The mills and organisation of the Lancashire Cotton Corporation Limited. Blackfriars House, Manchester: Lancashire Cotton Corporation Limited.
- Roberts, A S (1921), "Arthur Robert's Engine List", Arthur Roberts Black Book., One guy from Barlick-Book Transcription, archived from the original on 23 July 2011
- Williams, Mike; Farnie, Douglas Anthony (1992). Cotton Mills of Greater Manchester. Carnegie Publishing. ISBN 0-948789-69-7.
