= Clegg Hall =

Listed building in Greater Manchester, England

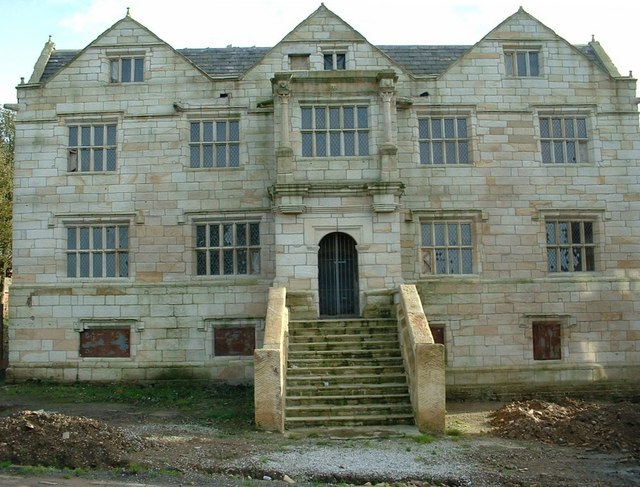
- Clegg Hall following restoration

- Location within Greater Manchester

General information
- Location: Littleborough, Greater Manchester, England
- Coordinates: 53.626605°N 2.117423°W
- Completed: 1610
- Client: Theophilus Ashton (1584–1621)

Design and construction
- Designations

Listed Building – Grade II*
- Official name: Clegg Hall
- Designated: 9 August 1951
- Reference no.: 1309615

Clegg Hall is a Grade II* listed 17th-century hall in Littleborough, Greater Manchester, England. It is situated just outside Smithy Bridge.

== History ==
The "Clegg" in the name of the current hall refers to the location (Little Clegg or Great Clegg) rather than the local family by the same surname – the house was built by Theophilus Ashton (1584–1621) in the early 17th century, and it has never been suggested that the house has been lived in by Cleggs. It appears to be on the site of an earlier Clegg Hall(s) whose occupants were Cleggs.

According to Oakley's highly romanticised version, the first known Cleggs, Bernulf (and his wife Quernilda) de Clegg were in the Domesday Book, though they are more commonly said to date to King Stephen's reign (1135–1154). That would seem sensible dating from the names, as they are all Anglo Saxon apart from the "de" which is a Norman addition, typical of the period before Norman Christian names became common.

Clegg Hall was designated a Grade II* listed building in 1951.

== Boggart ==
The hall is reputed to be haunted. The Clegg Hall boggart (as the ghost is better known) is usually placed in the 13th century. The longest version is a fictionalised account in a book called In Olden Days written by a local vicar (Revd. Oakley) in the early years of the 20th century. It reckoned that the master of the house went off to France to fight with Henry. While the father was away the wicked uncle killed both his nephews, throwing them over the battlements into the moat of what was presumably a fortified house. Eventually the father returned. His brother crept through a secret passage from a nearby hall (possibly Stubley Old Hall - although somewhat unlikely as they are 2 miles (3.2 km) apart), ready to do away with the distraught father, when one of the children's voices was heard calling out "Father beware!" (or words to that effect) and the father awoke, sending his evil brother running terrified to plunge to his death. Ever since, allegedly, the phantom boy has been heard issuing warnings.

The current building was described in a 1626 survey of Rochdale as "a faire capital messuage built with free stone with all new fair houses of office there-unto belonging with gardens, fishponds and divers closes of land". It also refers to "barns, stables, courts, orchards, gardens, folds and pigeon houses".

At least two books refer to the ghost and later uses of the current building. One is Harland and Wilkinson's Lancashire Legends, originally published in 1873. This says: "After many changes of occupants it is now in part used as a country alehouse; other portions of it are inhabited by the labouring classes, who find employment in that populous manufacturing district. It is the property of the Fentons, by purchase from the late John Entwisle Esq of Foxholes." The other, Lancashire Legends by Katherine Eyre (1972), says that from 1818 to 1869 it was a public house called the Horse and Hounds, but generally known as the Black Sloven, the name of a favourite hunting mare of legendary speed which belonged to the former owner, Mr Charles Turner. He died in 1733. It says that "The Boggart Chamber" became a place to be avoided, although it is not clear if this was in the pre-1620s house or not. It is alleged that a young girl was playing hide-and-seek and she was found dead behind a wall and a curtain. It also says that "during the Commonwealth era, there were hints of counterfeiting activities in the vaults and cellars of Clegg Hall"; it was common for smugglers and counterfeiters of the period to use tales of ghosts to scare off locals.

== Ruin and restoration ==
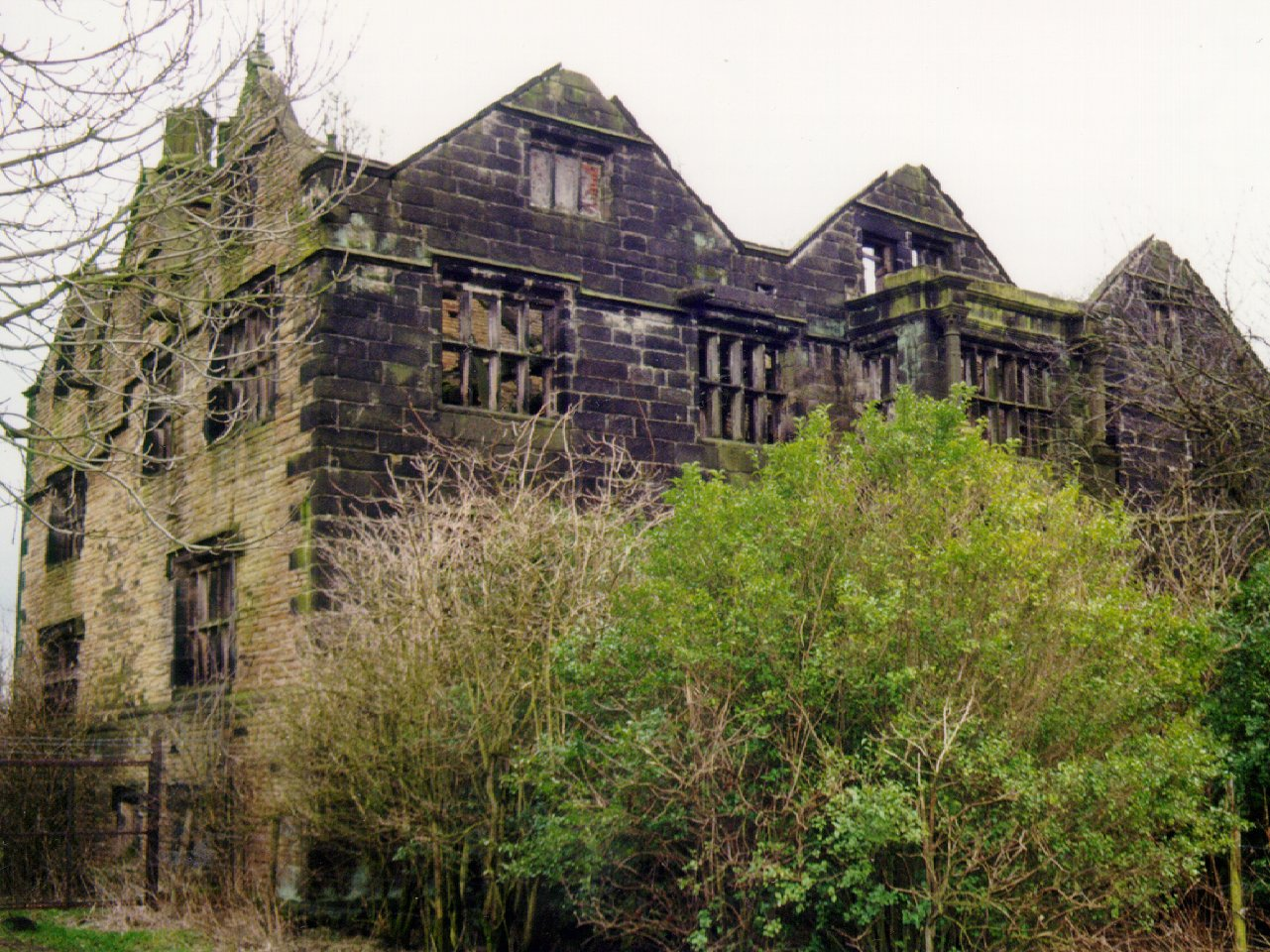
Clegg Hall as it appeared in 1999

Some time in the 1950s there was a fire at the hall which caused severe damage. A picture in Oakley's 1910 edition of In Olden Days shows it as a complete building. However, the text of a 1920s edition describes it as "a ruined hall", and in fact the hall was in such poor condition in the 1840s, when it was used as a public house, that it had its licence removed because of the dangerous condition and decay of the building. Sam Garside who was born in the hall in 1917 moved out in 1939. It was left in ruins until its 20th-century restoration. A local resident remembers playing there in the 1950s, when the upper floors were still present, and a farmer [Sam Garside] used the ground floor to house his chickens. Some time between the 1970s and 1999, the most impressive external feature – the portico from the front door – fell down and was removed.

In the late 1980s, following the building's purchase by the environmental organisation Pennine Heritage, rumours of a large-scale theme park centred on the hall led to the formation of a local residents' group to petition councillors for assurances their properties would not be compulsorily purchased. At one point there was a suggestion that Clegg Hall, which is near the Rochdale Canal, could be turned into a museum, but this proved too expensive. Pennine Heritage Trust protected and saved the hall from demolition until a new owner who would sympathetically rebuild and restore the hall could be found.

Clegg Hall was restored to its pre-1608 condition between 2005 and 2011 during the ownership of Jason Stead who also restored another large mansion in Rochdale, Healey Hall, from 2000 to 2005. He owned both buildings at the same time. The work was started in February 2005 and completed by September 2009, leaving only kitchen and bathrooms, decoration and furnishings to complete. After receiving heritage awards and having been removed from the English Heritage Buildings at Risk Register in 2007, the hall was opened to the public for heritage weekends raising money for a multiple sclerosis charity throughout the restoration. Due to private ownership, it is no longer open to the public but videos and photos of the restoration are available.

== See also ==
- Grade II* listed buildings in Greater Manchester
- Listed buildings in Milnrow
