= Birchinley Manor Farmhouse =

Listed house in Greater Manchester, England

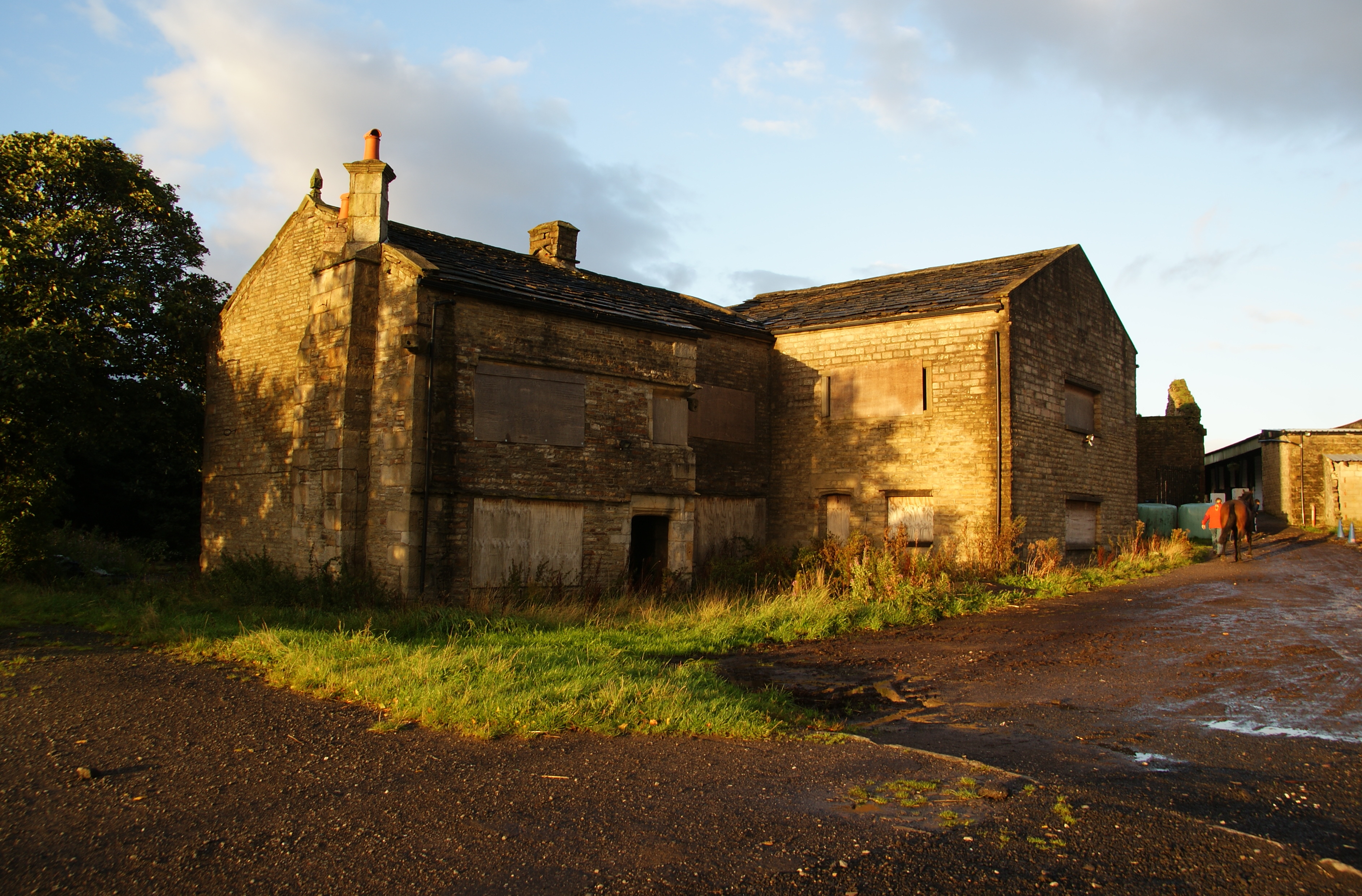
- Birchinley Manor Farmhouse in 2010

- Location within Greater Manchester

General information
- Location: Wildhouse Lane, Milnrow, Greater Manchester, England
- Coordinates: 53.6205°N 2.1073°W
- Year built: 1631; 395 years ago
- Renovated: 1973 (wing rebuilt)

Listed Building – Grade II*
- Official name: Birchinley Manor Farmhouse
- Designated: 24 January 1967
- Reference no.: 1334330

Listed Building – Grade II
- Official name: Barns adjoining east side of Birchinley Manor Farmhouse
- Designated: 23 April 1986
- Reference no.: 1096908

Birchinley Manor Farmhouse is a Grade II* listed early 17th-century building on Wildhouse Lane in Milnrow, a town within the Metropolitan Borough of Rochdale, Greater Manchester, England. The property was added to Historic England's Heritage at Risk Register in 2013 due to structural deterioration but was no longer on the register as of 2025 following conservation work. The surrounding land has since been redeveloped for housing.

== History ==
The farmhouse dates from the early 17th century, with inscriptions indicating 1631 on the door lintel and 1632 on a finial. Originally constructed as a yeoman's house, it reflects the rural character of the area before the Industrial Revolution. The building underwent alterations over time, including the rebuilding of one wing in 1973, which incorporated original features such as the 1631 lintel.

On 24 January 1967, Birchinley Manor Farmhouse was designated a Grade II* listed building.

In 2020 plans were approved for a major housing development on land surrounding the farmhouse. The scheme proposed the construction of dozens of new homes as part of a wider effort to regenerate the area and meet local housing demand. The development aimed to retain the historic character of the site by preserving the farmhouse while introducing modern residential properties on the adjacent land.

== Architecture ==
The building is constructed from hammer-dressed stone and topped with a graduated stone slate roof. The building follows a three-unit hearth-passage plan and is arranged over two storeys, reflecting its early 17th-century origins.

The farmhouse features projecting cross-wings, with the left wing retaining a recessed porch fitted with stone seats. The door surrounds are particularly notable, comprising a chamfered Tudor-arched inner doorway and a moulded outer doorway with a basket-headed lintel and recessed spandrels. The windows are predominantly ovolo-moulded, double-chamfered mullion designs, including five-light and four-light configurations, some of which turn the angle of the building. A continuous hood mould runs above the windows and doors, adding to the architectural detailing.

Additional features include a projecting gable chimney stack with two diagonally set shafts and a ridge stack. Decorative elements include gargoyles, coped gables with kneelers, and finials, including one dated apex finial. Although the interior has been significantly altered over time, it retains original chamfered beams.

== Heritage at Risk Register ==
In 2013 Birchinley Manor Farmhouse was added to Historic England's Heritage at Risk Register due to concerns over structural deterioration and lack of maintenance. It was highlighted as one of several historic buildings in Rochdale considered vulnerable to decay and inappropriate alteration, and it remained on the list in 2016. As of 2025, the building is no longer included on the register.

== Associated barns ==
The site also includes two Grade II-listed barns of different periods. The earlier barn dates from the late 17th or early 18th century, while the later barn is inscribed with the date 1832. Both structures are constructed of hammer-dressed stone with graduated stone slate roofs, although sections of the roofing have been replaced with corrugated asbestos sheets.

The earlier barn is notable for its unusually long plan, positioned parallel to the later barn and forming an enclosed space between the barns and the farmhouse. Architectural features include quoins, opposed elliptical-headed cart entries with chamfered surrounds bearing crudely carved heads on the springing stones, two chamfered door openings (one with a Tudor-arched lintel), a three-light chamfered mullion window, and a loft hatch. The gables are coped with kneelers, and the roof structure is of 20th-century date.

The later barn is wider and shorter in form. It incorporates quoins, three door openings separated by heavily dressed vents, and loft hatches at each end (one now blocked). The north end reuses an earlier door surround and includes a date plaque marking its construction.

== See also ==
- Grade II* listed buildings in Greater Manchester
- Listed buildings in Milnrow
