= Newhey =

Village in Greater Manchester, England

Coordinates: 53.6001°N 2.0982°W

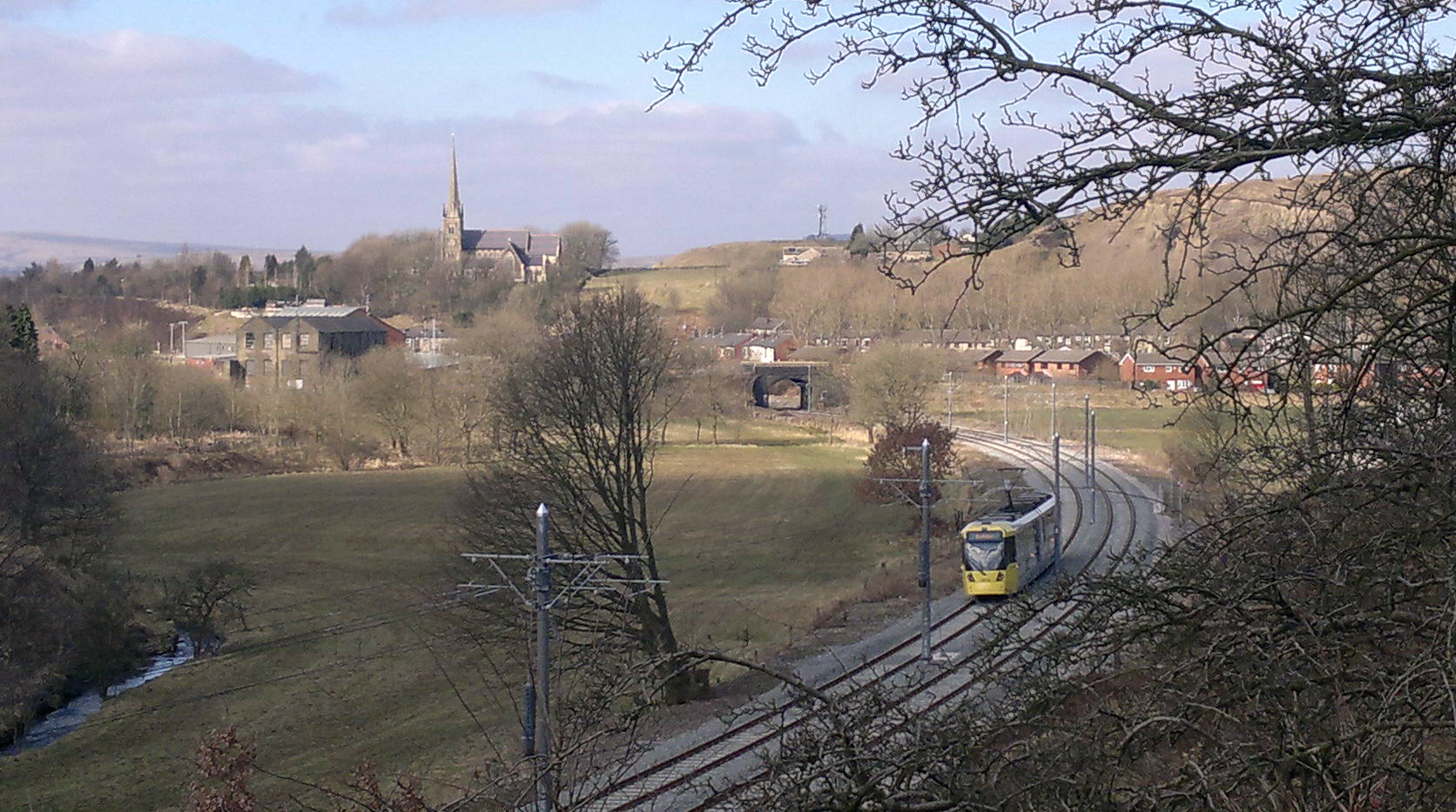
- Newhey from its boundary with Shaw and Crompton

- Location within Greater Manchester
- OS grid reference: SD934115
- Metropolitan borough: Rochdale
- Metropolitan county: Greater Manchester
- Region: North West
- Country: England
- Sovereign state: United Kingdom
- Post town: ROCHDALE
- Postcode district: OL16
- Dialling code: 01706
- Police: Greater Manchester
- Fire: Greater Manchester
- Ambulance: North West
- UK Parliament: Rochdale

Newhey (archaically New Hey) is a village in the town of Milnrow in the Metropolitan Borough of Rochdale, in Greater Manchester, England. It lies at the foot of the South Pennines, by Junction 21 of the M62 motorway and on the River Beal, 3 miles (4.8 km) east-southeast of Rochdale, 10 miles (16.1 km) northeast of Manchester.

Historically a part of Lancashire, Newhey was anciently a hamlet within the township of Butterworth. It was described in 1828 as "consisting of several ranges of cottages and two public houses". In the early 19th century a major road was built through Newhey from Werneth to Littleborough. Newhey was incorporated into the Milnrow Urban District in 1894.

Newhey expanded as part of an unplanned process of urbanisation, brought on by the introduction of textile manufacture during the Industrial Revolution, and is now home to the Ellenroad Steam Museum - the engine house of the former Ellenroad Ring Mill, the rest of which was demolished in 1985. It holds the world's largest working steam engine.

== History ==
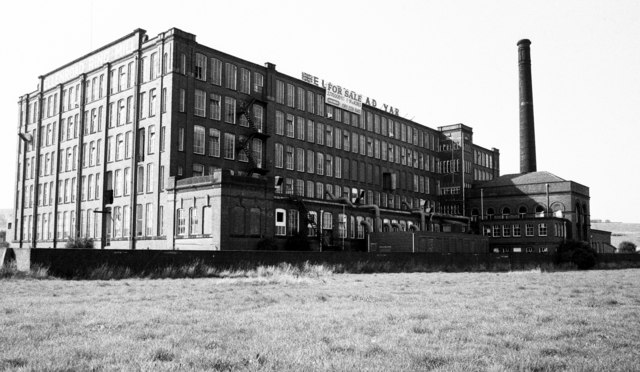
Ellenroad Ring Mill, as it was in 1984.

Lying by the older localities of Milnrow, Ogden and Haugh, Newhey is thought to have acquired its name as a result of land reclamation.

Newhey was home to the Newhey Brick and Terracotta Co. Ltd., a prosperous brick and tile works which opened on Huddersfield Road in 1899. Its bricks are found in buildings worldwide. Most mills and associated terraced houses in the Rochdale and Oldham areas were built from this "Newhey brick".

In the 1920s, Newhey had at least five cotton mills, including Ellenroad, Newhey, Coral, Haugh and Garfield (demolished 1969).

== Governance ==
From a very early time, Newhey was part of the Butterworth township of Rochdale parish, in the Hundred of Salfordshire.

From 1894 to 1974, Newhey was part of Milnrow Urban District in the administrative county of Lancashire. In the local government reforms of 1974, this urban district status was abolished and Newhey is now part of the Metropolitan Borough of Rochdale.

Newhey was previously part of the Littleborough and Saddleworth constituency. It is now represented in the House of Commons as part of the parliamentary constituency of Rochdale.

== Geography ==
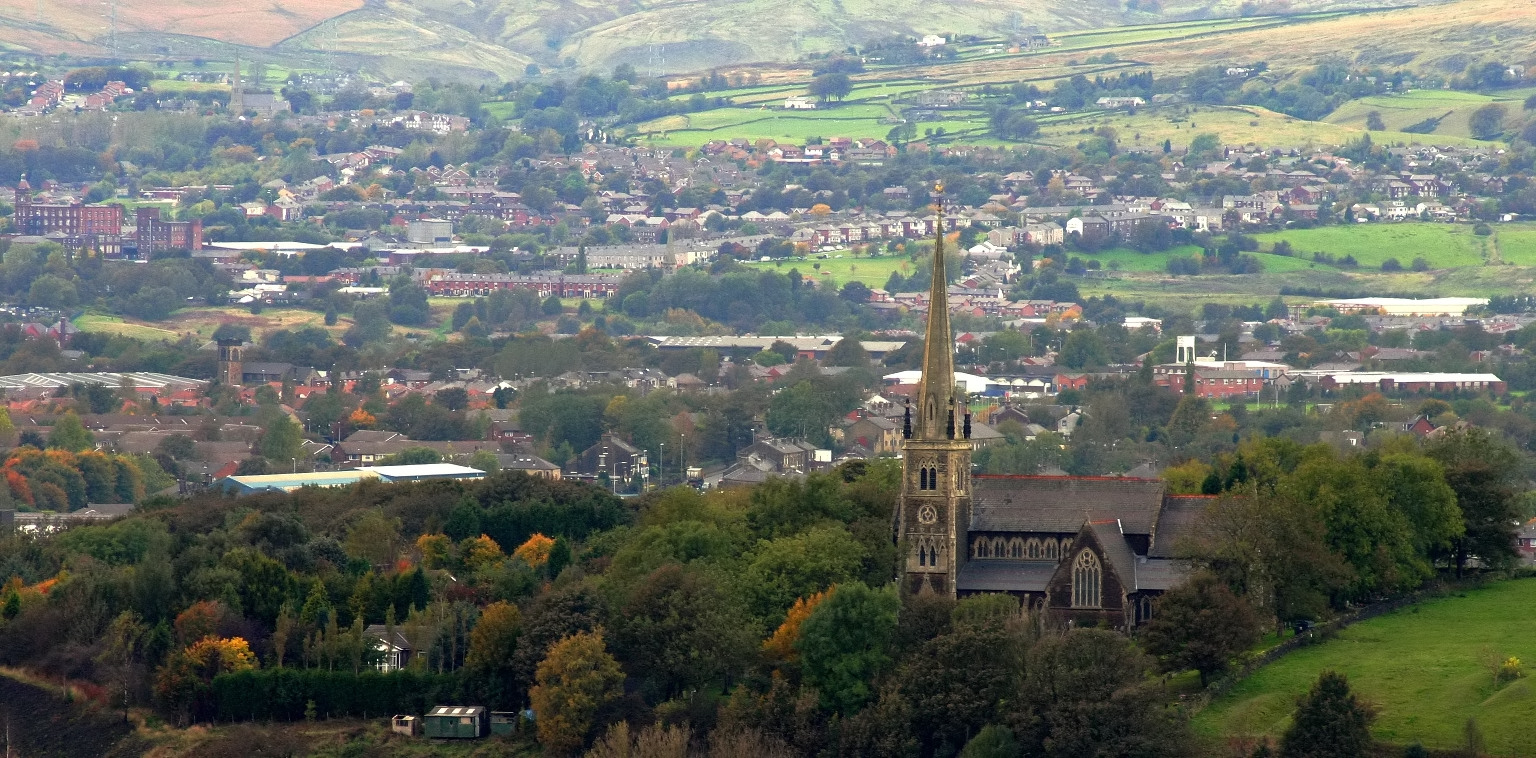
Looking over Newhey

The lowest elevation, at the River Beal, as approximately 150 m, rising to 250 m both to the South towards Shaw, and towards reservoirs North of the village.

The housing estate south of Newhey Road and east of Bentgate Street is known as Bentgate.

Localities in and around Newhey include Haugh and Woodbottom. Several reservoirs lie above and to the east, including Ogden, Kitcliffe, and Piethorne.

== Landmarks ==
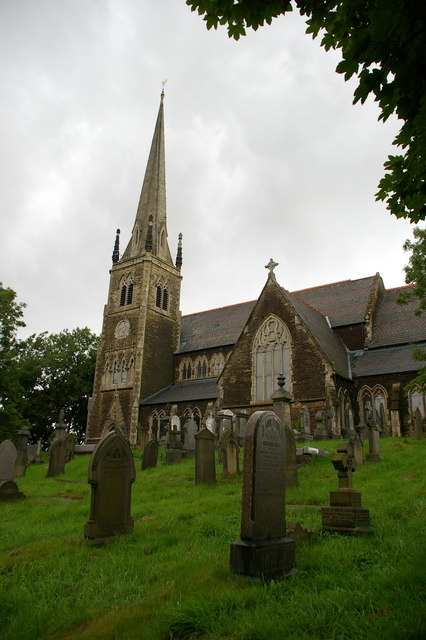
St Thomas's at Newhey

Milnrow War Memorial, a Grade II listed structure, is in Newhey's Memorial Park. Originally in central Milnrow (set back from the road near Milnrow Bridge), it was unveiled in 1924 by Major General A Solly-Flood, a former commander of 42nd (East Lancashire) Division. Sculpted from Sandstone by G Thomas in 1923, the memorial is surmounted by a bronze statue of a First World War infantry soldier with rifle and fixed bayonet, symbolic of the district's young manhood in early First World War. The plinth has bronze and slate panels which show the names of local men who died in the two World Wars.

Ellenroad Engine House was designed by Sir Philip Stott, 1st Baronet. Its tall chimney makes it a local landmark.

Newhey parish church, dedicated to St. Thomas, was built in 1876 to serve the new Anglican parish of Newhey. Its patron is the Bishop of Manchester. The church was badly damaged by arson on 21 December 2007.

== Transport ==
Newhey is served by the M62 motorway and Newhey Metrolink station.
Bus Services serve Shaw, Burnedge, Turf Hill, Milnrow, Kingsway Business Park and Rochdale, operated by Bee Network

== See also ==
- Listed buildings in Milnrow
