= Rope drive =

Belt drive using circular section ropes

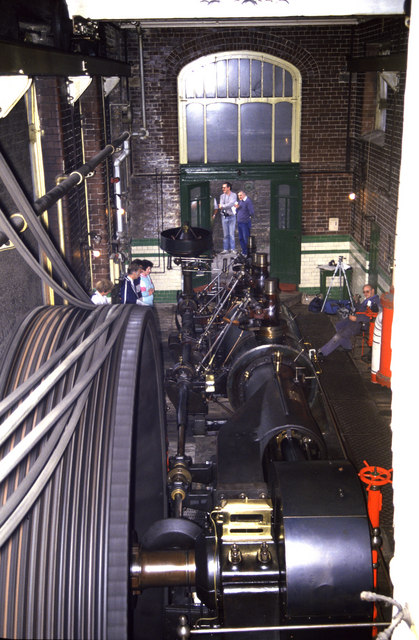
Mill engine at Bamford Mill

A rope drive is a form of belt drive, used for mechanical power transmission.

Rope drives use a number of circular section ropes, rather than a single flat or V-belt.

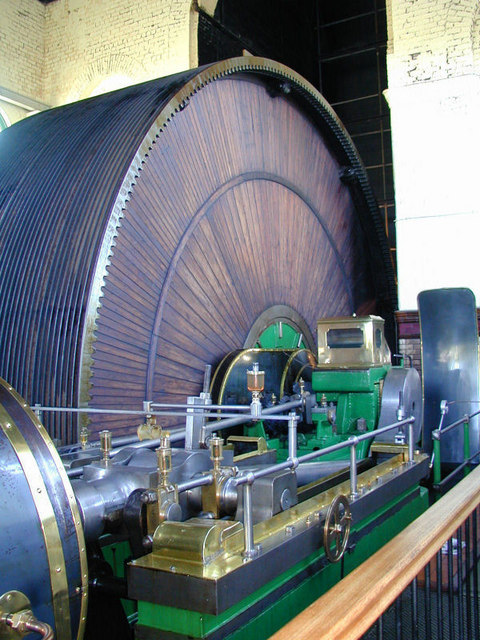
Flywheel and rope drum of the large mill engines Victoria and Alexandra at Ellenroad Mill

== Multiple rope drive ==
The first multiple rope drive was a 9-rope drive of 200 bhp produced by Combe Barbour for their Falls Foundry, Belfast, in 1863. James Combe experimented first with circular ropes laid from leather strips, then from manila hemp. The idea of using rope drives had arisen from his earlier, 1856, experiments in using a rope drive together with an expanding vee pulley, as part of a Van Doorne or Variomatic transmission. Combe Barbour were makers of textile machinery and differential speed gearing was often needed as part of the spinning process, where one shaft could be smoothly adjusted to run slightly faster or slower than another.

== Usage ==
Rope drives were most widely used for power-transmission in mills and factories, where a single mill engine would have a large rope drive to each floor, where lineshafts across each floor distribute power to the individual machines. These multiple rope drives replaced the earlier technique of a vertical wrought iron shaft with bevel gears at each floor. They remained in use for as long as mills were driven by central steam engines, rather than individual electric motors. Some were used with early electric motors, where these were large single motors driving a whole floor of machinery. A 1907 installation at Droylesden split the output of one motor between two floors with two new rope drives. Rope drives were rarely used in the internal-combustion era, although some were used with gas engines running on producer gas. A Yorkshire mill converted to use a 1,000 hp Allen diesel engine in 1938, and retained the rope drives.

Shaft drives had often used gearing from the engines to increase their speed, and thus their power transmission. This was avoided for rope drives, as the rope's maximum useful speed could be achieved from the engine's flywheel and flexibility of the ropes led to backlash in the gearing.

== Power ==
Power transmitted was typically 50 bhp per rope, for ropes working at 5,000 feet / minute. (Note: Approximately 60 rpm for a typical flywheel rope pulley of up to 30 foot diameter.) Groups of ropes could drive different floors and they also allowed individual ropes to be replaced separately, and without losing all power to a mill floor after a rope breakage.

US practice sometimes used a single rope, looped between floors and tensioned by an idler pulley, but this system was not used in the UK and each loop was tensioned between its two pulleys by one of them being movable. Rope drives were also cheaper than belts - around a quarter of the price.

== Factory power distribution ==
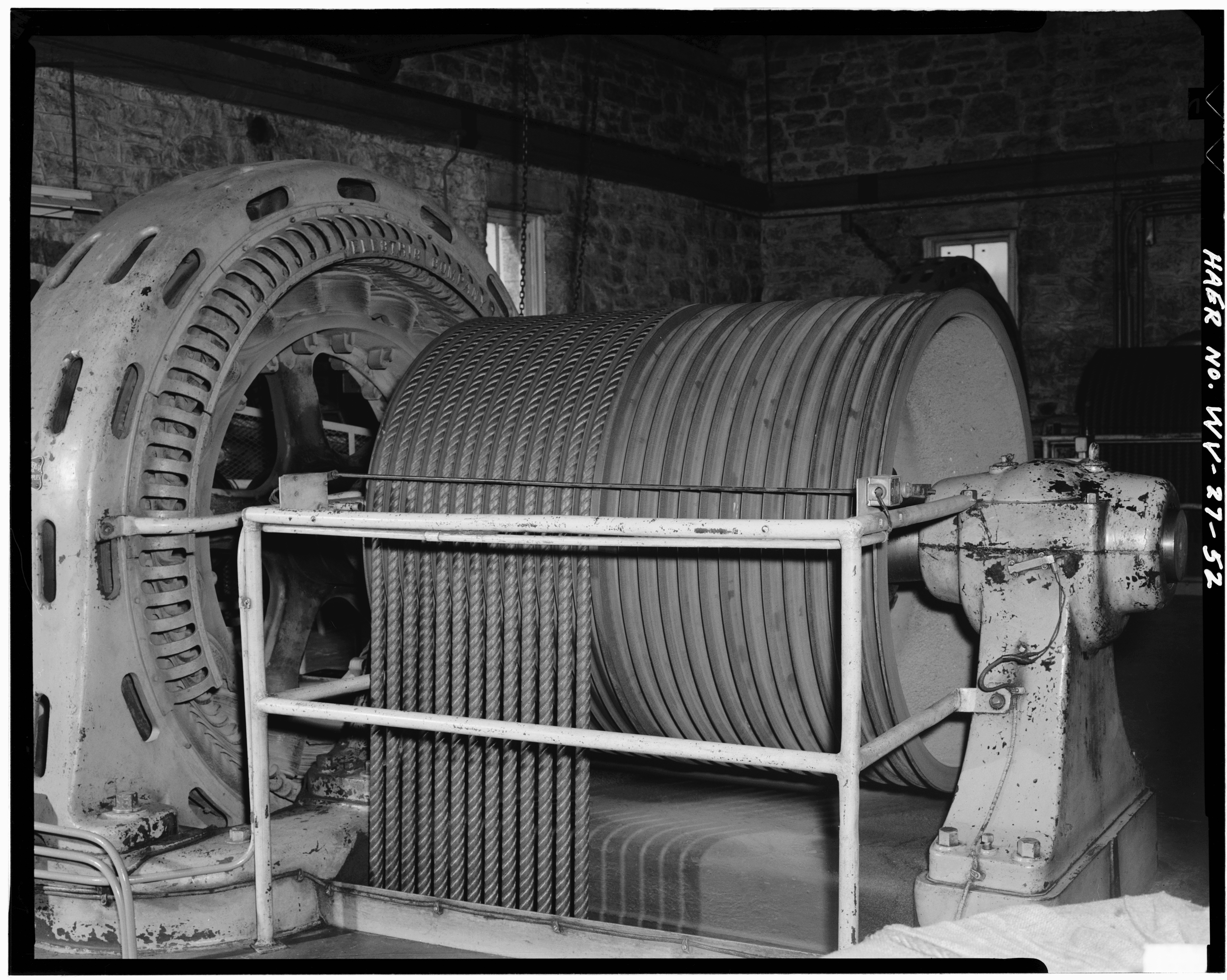
Rope drive in a hydroelectric plant

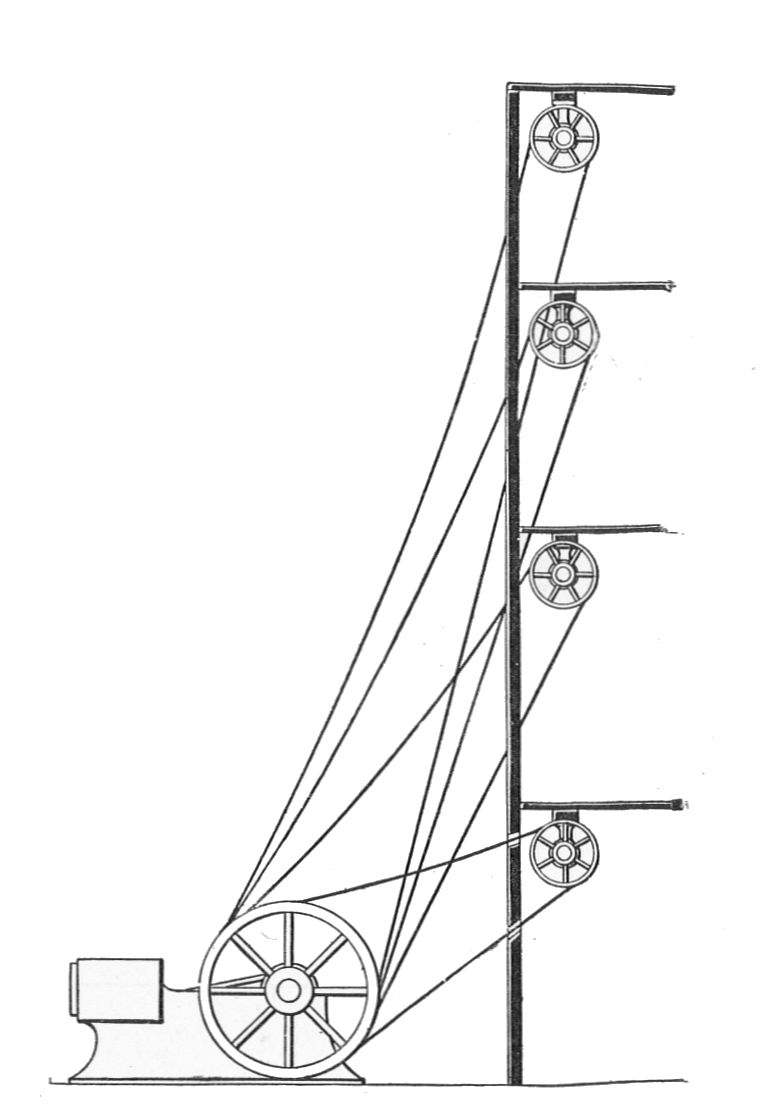
Multiple rope drives driving lineshafts on each factory floor

The rope drives were placed in a large diagonal shaft at the side of the building, usually windowless and distinctively visible from outside the building. (Note: Vertical shafts were not widely used for rope drives in the UK, although were used for belts, as diagonal ropes could be made self-tensioning on the lower pulley under their own weight.)

Rope drives required a larger such shaft than comparable belt or shaft drives. As the open shaft represented a channel for transmitting fires, unlike the narrow holes of a shaft drive, it needed careful fireproofing from the loom floors.

It was sometimes arranged for large drives that the engine drove a set of horizontal ropes to a pulley on a layshaft or 'second motion shaft' alongside the engine house, then diagonally up through the shaft.
