= Urmson & Thompson =

English company

- Industry: Engineering
- Founded: 1865
- Defunct: 1933 (Receivership)
- Headquarters: Oldham
- Number of locations: 1 (Hathershaw Ironworks)
- Products: Mill manufacturing, Laundry equipment, Stationary steam engines
- Owner: 1821– John Urmson & John E Thompson. 1899– Urmson & Thompson Ltd.

Urmson & Thompson was a company that manufactured stationary steam engines. It was based in Oldham, Lancashire, England. The company were general millwrights, also producing some steam engines during the 19th century and after 1904 produced large steam-driven engines for textile mills in Oldham.

== History ==
John Urmson and John E Thompson started business in 1865 in Hathershaw, Oldham. While Urmson was a trained engineer who had worked at Woolstenhulmes & Rye, Thompson is thought to have contributed capital. Thompson died in 1882, and Urmson with his sons John and Andrew continued the business. On the sons' death in 1888 the firm was incorporated, and continued until 1933.

The firm operated out of the Hathershaw Foundry. Initially millwrights, in the 1870s they started making stationary steam engines as well. From 1904 they made a series of large mill engines. The largest was a 2000ihp engine for Ace Mill Co. Ltd., Chadderton in 1914. This was erected in 1919.

The later engines were large. Arthur Roberts reported that Hartford Mill was powered by an 1800 hp twin-tandem compound engine by Urmson and Thompson, built in 1907. It was steamed at 160 psi at 68 rpm. It had a 5 ft stroke driving a 24 ft flywheel. The transmission method was a rope drive using 40 ropes. The engine was reputed to be the only twin-tandem that Urmson & Thompson built. It had two 30" diameter HP (high-pressure) cylinders at the rear, and two 60" LP (low-pressure) cylinders in front. There were Corliss valves on all cylinders. The air pumps were driven from each crosshead. There was a Whitehead governor. The engine cost £5400 and the three boilers cost £1900.

== Mills driven by Urmson & Thompson engines ==
Urmson & Thompson produced mill engines in the boom years of the 1870s, and millwrighted (i.e. produced the bevelled gear shafts) for mills such as Nile Mill, Chadderton. The period 1904–1914 was productive, when they created engines rating a total of 14,300 ihp for nine Oldham mills:

- Parkfield Mill, Oldham – 1874
- Hollinwood Mill, Failsworth – 1874
- Honeywell Mill, Oldham – 1874
- Copster Mill – 1904
- Hartford Mill, Werneth – 1907
- Gorse Mill, Chadderton – 1908
- Ace Mill, Chadderton – 1914 (aka Gorse No.2 Mill)
- Falcon Mill, Chadderton – 1915
