= Butterworth (surname) =

Butterworth is an English toponymic surname. It is derived from the former township of Butterworth, Lancashire, England, an area in which the surname was still very common as of 2014.

== People ==
Notable people who share this surname include:

- Aiden Butterworth (born 1961), retired English football player
- Albert Butterworth (1912–1991), English professional footballer
- Alexander Kaye Butterworth (1854–1946), General Manager of the North Eastern Railway
- Allen Butterworth (1939–1974), British archaeology and museum curator
- Anthony Butterworth (born 1945), British immunologist
- Archie Butterworth (1912–2005), Irish inventor and racing motorist
- Arthur Butterworth (1923–2014), English composer
- Benjamin Butterworth (1837–1898), American lawyer and politician
- Benjamin Butterworth (cricketer) (1832–1879), Australian cricketer
- Bob Butterworth (born 1942), former Florida attorney general
- Brad Butterworth (born 1959), yachtsman from New Zealand
- Brian Butterworth (born 1944), cognitive neuropsychologist at University College London researching speech, reading and mathematics
- Charles Butterworth (actor) (1896–1946), film actor, comedian of the 1930s and 1940s
- Charles Butterworth (philosopher) (born 1938), American professor of political philosophy
- Clara Butterworth (1888–1996), English actress and light operatic soprano
- Donna Butterworth (1956–2018), American actress
- Edgar Ray Butterworth (1847–1921), American funeral director
- Edwin Butterworth (1812–1848), English topographer of Lancashire
- Eliza Butterworth (born 1993), British-American actress
- Elizabeth Butterworth (born 1949), English artist
- Frank Butterworth (1870–1950), American football player and coach
- Frank Butterworth (footballer) (1914–1999), English amateur footballer
- Garry Butterworth (born 1969), British professional footballer
- George Butterworth (1885–1916), English composer killed in the First World War
- George Butterworth (cartoonist) (1905–1988), British political, strip and sports cartoonist, later a book illustrator
- George Butterworth (psychologist) (1946–2000), British professor of psychology who studied infant development
- Herbert Butterworth (1902–1938), English professional footballer
- Horace Butterworth (1868–1939), American university football coach in 1907
- Hugh Butterworth (1885–1915), English cricketer, schoolteacher and soldier
- Ian Butterworth (born 1964), English professional footballer
- Jack Butterworth, Baron Butterworth (1918–2003), British lawyer
- James Butterworth (1771–1837), English author
- Jez Butterworth (born 1969), English playwright and screenwriter
- Jim Butterworth (entrepreneur), American technology entrepreneur and documentary filmmaker
- Jim Butterworth (politician), Habersham County, Georgia Commission Chairman and State Senator
- Jon-Allan Butterworth (born 1986), British paralympic cyclist
- Joseph Butterworth (1770–1826), English law bookseller and politician
- Louise Butterworth (born 1985), English pole vaulter
- Luke Butterworth (born 1983), Tasmanian cricketer
- Mary Butterworth (1686–1775), Colonial American counterfeiter
- Michael Butterworth (born 1947), British author and publisher
- Mike Butterworth (1924–1986), British comic book writer
- Miriam Butterworth (1918–2019), American educator, politician, and activist
- Nick Butterworth (born 1946), British children's author and illustrator
- Oliver Butterworth (1915–1990), American children's author and educator
- Oliver Butterworth (violinist), British violinist, music educator, and arts administrator
- Peter Butterworth (1919–1979), English comic actor
- Ryan Butterworth (born 1981), Zimbabwean cricketer
- Stephen Butterworth (1885–1958), the inventor of the Butterworth filter
- Tyler Butterworth (born 1959), English actor
- Tyler Butterworth (sergeant), American military personnel and police officer
- Wally Butterworth (1901–1974), American radio announcer and host
- W. E. Butterworth (1929–2019), who wrote as W. E. B. Griffin
- William Butterworth (businessman) (1864–1936), American businessman and early Deere & Company president
- William John Butterworth (1801–1856), English colonel and Governor of the Straits Settlements
- William Walton Butterworth (1903–1975), American career diplomat and ambassador

== Fictional characters ==
- Chastity Butterworth, a comedy character played by Gemma Whelan in various live and TV shows
