= Butterworth =

Butterworth may refer to:

== Places ==
- Butterworth, Greater Manchester, a former township and civil parish centred on Milnrow, England, formerly in Lancashire
- Butterworth, Eastern Cape, now also known as Gcuwa, a town located in South Africa
- Butterworth, Penang, the principal town of Seberang Perai in the state of Penang, Malaysia
  - RMAF Butterworth, air base near Butterworth, Penang, Malaysia
  - Butterworth railway station, a major railway station serving Butterworth, Penang, Malaysia
- Butterworth, Ohio, a ghost town, United States
- Butterworth, Virginia, unincorporated community, United States

== People ==
- Butterworth (surname), including a list of people with the name

== Other uses ==
- Aston Butterworth, British racing car constructor
- Butterworth filter, a type of electronic filter design, eponym of Stephen Butterworth
- LexisNexis Butterworths, publisher
- Mrs. Butterworth's, a brand of pre-packaged syrups and pancake mixes
- Butterworth (1785 ship), originally a privateer, then a whaler
  - Butterworth Squadron, flotilla of whaling ships organised around Butterworth
