= George Butterworth (disambiguation) =

George Butterworth (1885–1916) was a British composer.

George Butterworth may also refer to:

- George Butterworth (psychologist) (1946–2000), British psychologist
- George Butterworth (cartoonist) (1905–1988), British cartoonist
- George Michael Butterworth, Old Testament scholar
- George Butterworth (tennis) (1858–1941), British tennis player
