= Thomas Butterworth =

Australian cricketer

Personal information
- Born: 17 December 1828; Rochdale, Lancashire, England
- Died: 15 July 1877 (aged 48); Kensington, London, England
- Relatives: Ben Butterworth (brother)

Domestic team information
- Years: Team
- 1857/58: Victoria
- 1866/67: Otago
- Source: Cricinfo, 6 May 2016

Thomas Butterworth (17 December 1828 – 15 July 1877) was an English-bon cricketer who played first-class cricket in both Australia and New Zealand. He was born at Rochdale in Lancashire in 1828.

Butterworth played two first-class matches for Victoria in 1857/58 and one for Otago in 1866/67. He is known to have played in other matches for the Gentlemen of Victoria in 1857 and in a match for Castlemaine Cricket Club in 1864 against an English touring team organised by George Parr. His brother, Ben Butterworth, also played in both of these matches, as well as making three first-class appearances for Victoria.

Butterworth died at Kensington in London in 1877. He was aged 51.
