= Edwin Butterworth =

English journalist, antiquarian and topographer (1812–48)

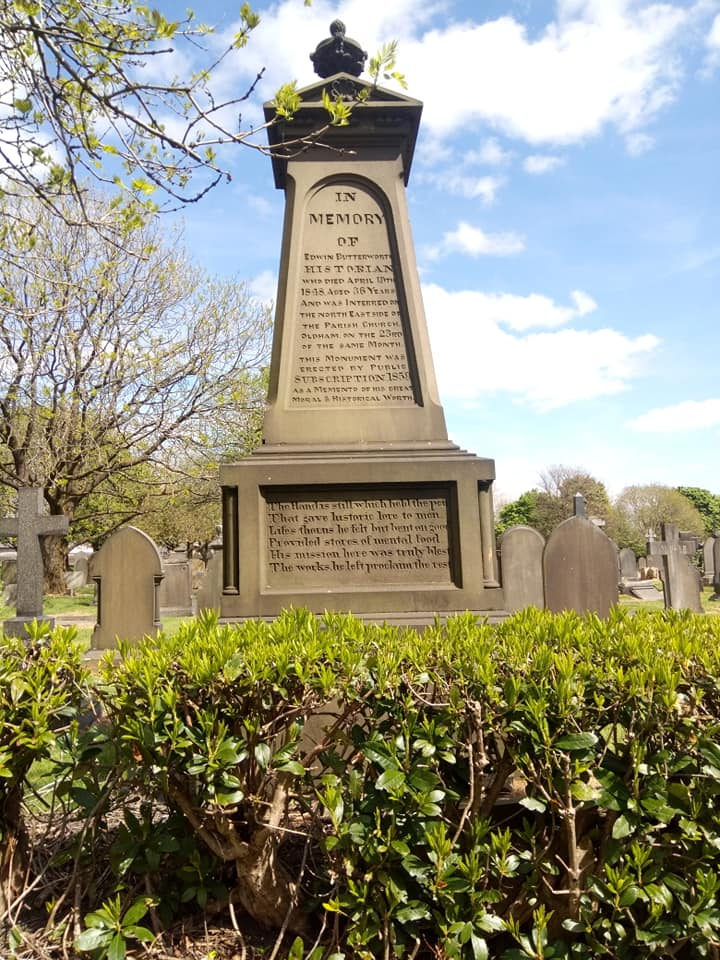
- The Grave of Edwin Butterworth
- Born: 1 October 1812; Oldham, Lancashire
- Died: 19 April 1848 (aged 35); Oldham, Lancashire
- Occupations: Journalist; Author; Antiquarian; Topographer
- Parent: James Butterworth

Edwin Butterworth (1 October 1812 – 19 April 1848) was an English journalist, topographer, antiquarian and writer on local history known particularly as a researcher for Edward Baines's History of Lancashire.

== Life and career ==
Butterworth was the tenth and youngest child of the topographer James Butterworth, and was born at Pitses, near Oldham, in 1812. He followed in the footsteps of his father, whom he assisted in his later works, but was more given to statistical research. When Edward Baines undertook the preparation of a history of Lancashire, he found a useful colleague in Edwin Butterworth, who visited many parts of the county in order to collect the requisite particulars.

During the six years in which he was engaged by Edward Baines he travelled on foot through nearly every town and village in the county. His own notes and those of his father formed a large mass of manuscript material. Later researchers have noted that Butterworth not only provided material for Baines's history of Lancashire, but also, without acknowledgement, wrote most of the text.

He wrote local history books, which produced little remuneration; his main income was as a journalist, acting as correspondent for several Manchester newspapers. He was for a considerable time registrar of births and deaths for the township of Chadderton.

In 1847, Butterworth conceived the idea of publishing a history of Lancashire in fifty volumes, based on his extensive notes; each volume, while part of the general series, would also be complete in itself. This project was encouraged by the Earl of Ellesmere. Overtures were made to Samuel Bamford, as it was thought that his pleasant style and Butterworth's facts would make a popular combination. The suggestion was roughly treated by the Earl, and Butterworth's death occurred before such a plan could have been completed.

He is described by those who knew him as genial and modest. Butterworth died, unmarried, of typhoid fever on 19 April 1848. He was buried at Greenacres cemetery in Oldham, and in 1859 a monument to his memory was erected there by public subscription. Such of his books and manuscripts (including material inherited from his father) as had not been accidentally dispersed were purchased by the Platt Brothers, and by them presented to the town. They are now in Oldham Local Studies and Archives.

== Publications ==
Butterworth published:

- Biography of Eminent Natives, Residents, and Benefactors of the Town of Manchester (Manchester, 1829)
- A History of Oldham in Lancashire (London, 1832)
- A Chronological History of Manchester brought down to 1834 (second edition, Manchester, 1834; the first edition was the Tabula Mancuniensis of his father)
- An Historical Description of the Town of Heywood and Vicinity (Heywood, 1840)
- A Statistical Sketch of the County Palatine of Lancaster (London, 1841)
- An Historical Account of the Towns of Ashton-under-Lyne, Stalybridge, and Dukinfield (Ashton, 1842)
- Views of the Manchester and Leeds Railway, drawn from nature and on stone by A. F. Tait, with a descriptive history by Edwin Butterwort h (London, 1845)
- Historical Sketches of Oldham, by the late Edwin Butterworth, with an appendix containing the history of the town to the present time (Oldham, 1856; the previous edition appeared in 1847)
