= Butterworth Building =

- U.S. National Register of Historic Places
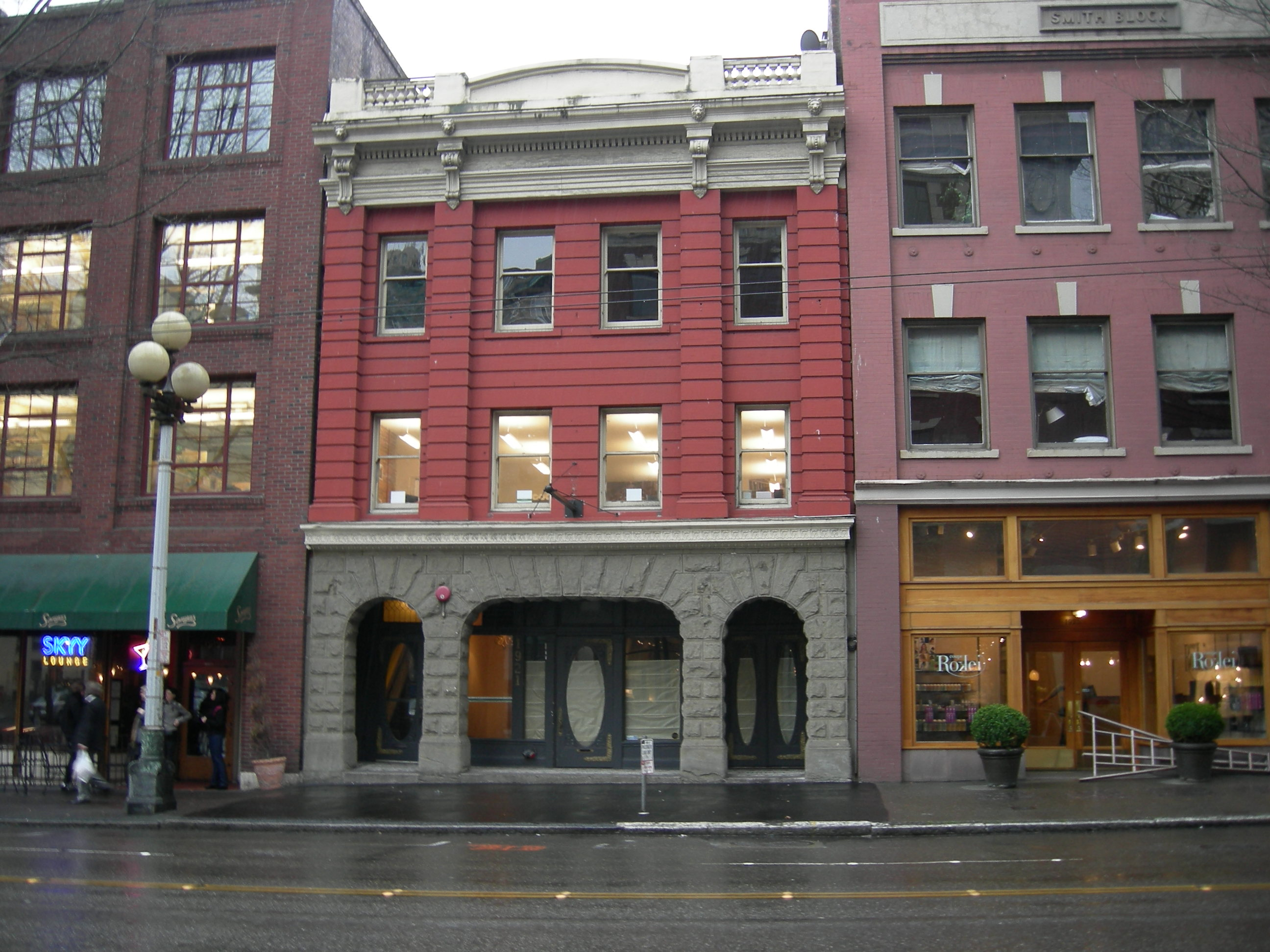
- Butterworth Building in Seattle

- Location within Downtown Seattle
- Location: 1921 First Ave. Seattle, Washington 98101
- Coordinates: 47.610509°N 122.342268°W
- Built: October 1, 1903; 123 years ago
- Architect: John Graham, Sr.
- Architectural style: Late Victorian
- NRHP reference No.: 71000873
- Added to NRHP: 14 May 1971

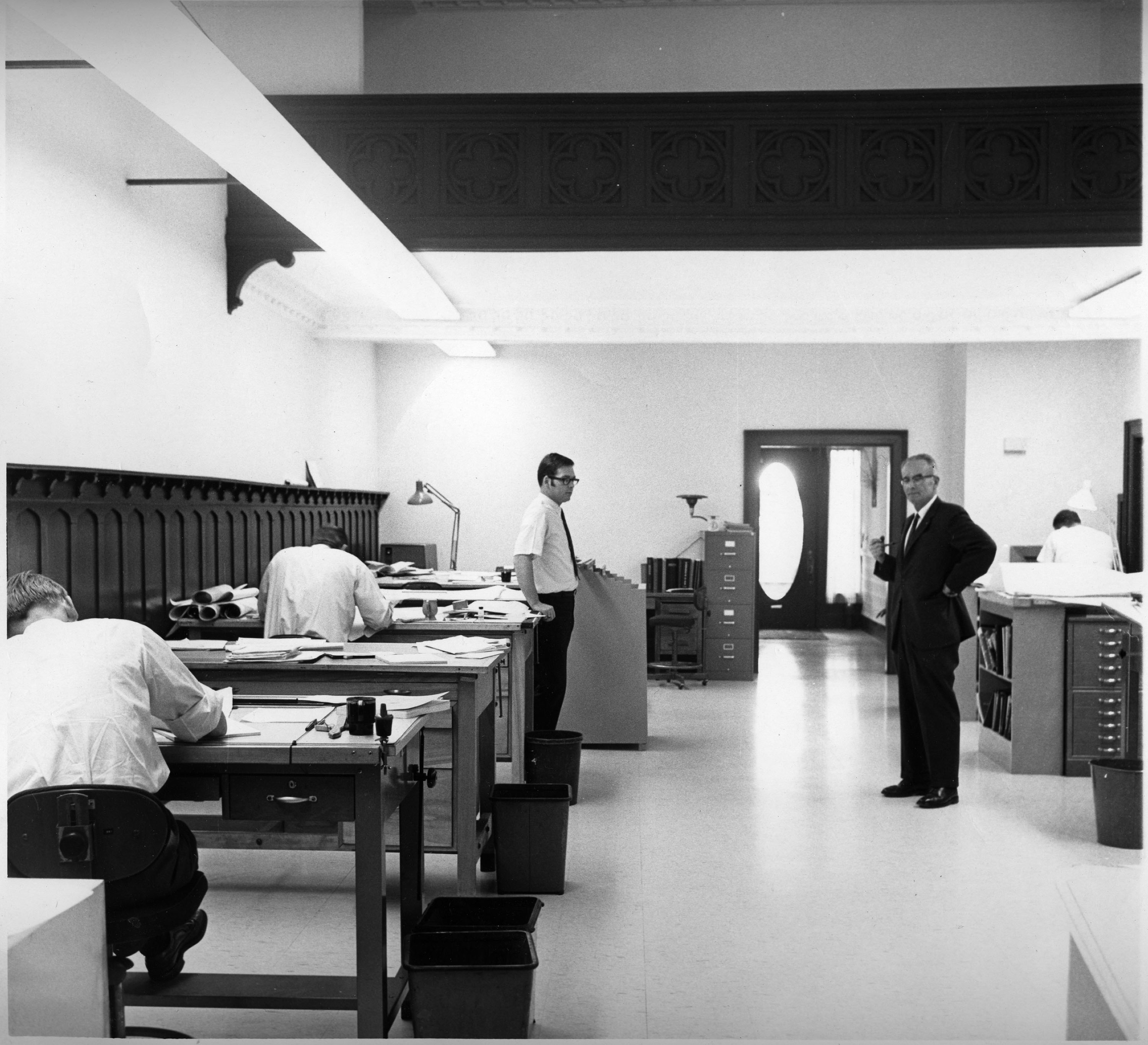
Livingstone Consulting Engineers office in the Butterworth Building, 1969

The Butterworth Building or Butterworth Block at 1921 First Avenue in Seattle, Washington was originally built as the Butterworth & Sons mortuary, which moved into this location in 1903 and moved to larger quarters in 1923. Located on a steep hill, the building has only three stories on the First Avenue side, but five on Post Alley. The building is listed on the National Register of Historic Places (NRHP); adjacent to Pike Place Market, it falls within the NRHP's Pike Place Public Market Historic District and the city's Place Market Historical District. Now owned by the McAleese Family since 2005.

The building was the city's first purpose-built mortuary building. Jeannie Yandel in 2009 described it as "The city's first place for comprehensive death-related services from corpse retrieval to coffin sales." The building had the first elevator on the West Coast of the United States, used to transport bodies. A Seattle Mail and Herald account from August 1904, shortly after the building opened, calls it "without question of doubt, the most complete establishment of its kind in the United States…" A 2008 Seattle Times article describes the building, still extant, as "[b]eautifully appointed in stained mahogany, art glass, ornamental plaster and specially designed brass and bronze hardware…" The basement, accessible through Post Alley at the rear, is now (as of 2009) home to Kells Irish Restaurant & Pub. Several recent accounts describe the Kells space as the former embalming room and crematorium, but the 1904 account says that the basement housed the building's heating plant, stables, and a storage space for funeral wagons.

The building is associated with several ghost stories. In 2010, the building was featured on an episode of Ghost Adventures.

== Original configuration ==
In the original configuration of the building, the upper floor consisted of three flats for employees of the firm. This floor was accessed by a separate entrance at the south end of the First Avenue façade. The next floor below contained a showroom for coffins (caskets), a separate showroom of child-sized coffins, a room of women's burial garments, and a private reception and consulting room. The main showroom of coffins had a view out the back to Elliott Bay. The 35 caskets on display in August 1904 were priced from US$25 to $200; garments ranged from a $4 robe to other garments costing as much as $125. These wide ranges of prices were typical of an establishment that intended to serve everyone from the poor to the city's wealthiest families. By policy, those who wished to remain with the bodies of their dead between encoffinment and obsequies were allowed to use the private rooms without additional charge.

The next floor down was the main floor facing onto First Avenue. The floor contained private offices, morgues, an embalming room, and a "utensil room" to store canopies, pedestals, rugs, laying-out beds etc. These rooms were accessed through the main entrance. A separate door to the north led to a vestibule and a funeral chapel with a main floor capacity of 150 and 50 in the balcony, as well as a separate choir balcony. An adjacent room for use of clergy and family had a capacity of about 15, and connected to a "retiring room", basically a full bathroom. The room for the use of clergy and family had a private entrance separate from the entrance to the chapel itself. Also on the first floor was a special "best show room" with particularly fine caskets; even in 1904 some of these ranged in price as high as $890.

The next floor down—below the First Avenue grade, but still above grade on Post Alley—contained a "stock room" with fireproof vaults in which bodies could be stored more or less indefinitely. The 1904 Seattle Mail and Herald account described these as "so much needed in Seattle when people are undecided as to the disposition of the dead", and up to the time of the construction of this building there was no such thing to be had in the city. The basement, level with Post Alley, housed the building's heating plant, stables, and a storage space for funeral wagons. Since 1983, the basement and stock room (now private banquet room) has been home to the McAleese family's Kells Irish Restaurant and Pub.
