= Tyler Butterworth (sergeant) =

American sergeant first class in the Virginia Army National Guard

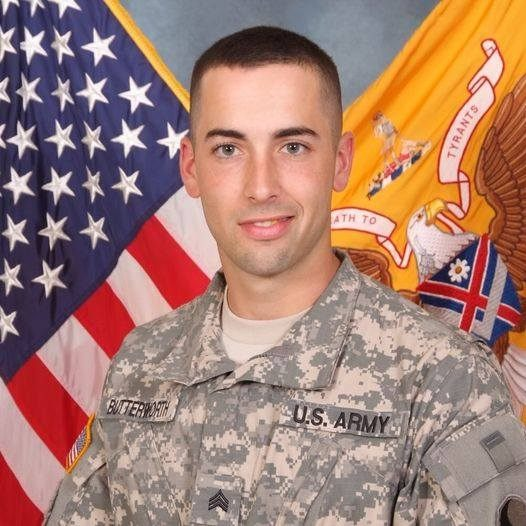
- Butterworth in 2011
- Branch: United States Army; National Guard Bureau; Virginia Army National Guard
- Rank: Sergeant first class
- Conflicts: Iraq War

Tyler Butterworth is an American sergeant first class in the Virginia Army National Guard and a civilian police officer. He posts humorous videos on social media depicting aspects of military life, which he uses as a recruitment tool for the National Guard.

== Career ==
Butterworth enlisted in the Virginia Army National Guard at 18 years old as an infantryman after being moved by the events of September 11 attacks. His service included a year-long deployment in support of Operation Iraq Freedom, followed by a reconnaissance mission deployment in Iraq. Upon returning, he attended community college while balancing a civilian career and part-time National Guard service.

Butterworth is a civilian police officer. Based in Arlington, Virginia, he transitioned into the Virginia Army National Guard's recruiting and retention battalion, focusing on reaching potential recruits through digital media. He later joined the National Guard Bureau's marketing team, using platforms like Instagram, TikTok, and YouTube to reach a younger audience.

Beginning in 2022, Butterworth's comedic social media videos under the handle @Butterworthdasyrup gained a large following. These videos humorously depict various aspects of military life, such as ASMR parodies and humorous takes on military meals. The content became an informal recruiting tool, with approximately 90 percent of his enlistments coming from social media engagement. Although his social media activity is personal and not officially endorsed by the U.S. Department of Defense, he adheres to its social media guidelines. In 2024, Butterworth started a ration-pack tasting series on YouTube, where he reviews military rations from various countries.
