= James Butterworth =

English author, antiquarian and topographer (1771–1837)

- Born: 28 August 1771; Ashton-under-Lyne, Lancashire
- Died: 23 November 1837 (aged 66); Oldham, Lancashire
- Occupations: Poet; Author; Antiquarian; Topographer
- Spouse: Hannah Boyton
- Children: 10, including: Edwin Butterworth

James Butterworth also known as Paul Bobbin (28 August 1771 – 23 November 1837) was an English author, poet, antiquarian and topographer of Manchester and the surrounding area.

== Life ==
The youngest of 11 children, Butterworth was born on 28 August 1771 in the parish of Ashton-under-Lyne, Lancashire. His parents, thought to be handloom weavers, sent him to school under John Taylor of Alt and there he took on some instruction of the lower classes.

Butterworth attained some skill in ornamental penmanship. After many years spent in tuition, he acted for some years as postmaster of Oldham, and died on 23 November 1837.

== Works ==
Despite expressing some early frustration with publishers, James Butterworth produced a series of books and pamphlets on local history, including his personal observations. His writings were:

- A Dish of Hodge Podge, or a Collection of Poems by Paul Bobbin, Esq., of Alt, near Oldham, printed for the author, 1800.
- Rocher Vale, a poem printed at Oxford 1804.
- An Historical and Descriptive Account of the Town and Parochial Chapelry of Oldham, Oldham, 1817; a second edition appeared in 1826, The Rustic Muse, a collection of poems, Oldham, 1818.
- A Sequel to the Lancashire Dialect, by Paul Bobbin, Couzin German of the famous Tim Bobbin of merry memory, Manchester, 1819; professedly written in the local dialects of the parishes of Ashton and Rochdale.
- The Antiquities of the Town, and a Complete History of the Trade of Manchester, Manchester, 1822; reissued in 1823 as A Complete History of the Cotton Trade, &c., by a person concerned in trade.
- History and Description of the Town and Parish of Ashton-under-Lyne and the Village of Dukinfield, Ashton, 1823.
- History and Description of the Towns and Parishes of Stockport, Ashton-under-Lyne, Mottram-Long-Den-Dale, and Glossop, with some memorials of the late F. D. Astley, Esq., of Dukinfield, and extracts from his poems, with an elegy to his memory, Manchester, 1827. These four works appear also to have been issued separately; the Memorials of F. D. Astley is dated 1828.
- A History and Description of the Parochial Chapelry of Saddleworth, Manchester, 1828.
- An Historical and Topographical Account of the Town and Parish of Rochdale, Manchester, 1828.
- The Instruments of Freemasonry Moralised, Manchester, 1829; a pamphlet.
- Tabula Mancuniensis, chronological table of the history of Manchester, Manchester, 1829; this pamphlet was the basis for Charles Henry Timperley's Annals of Manchester, and the Manchester Historical Recorder.
- A Gazetteer of the Hundred of Salford, Manchester, 1830, a pamphlet.

Some of Burton's manuscripts went, with those of his son Edwin, to the Oldham Lyceum. He is said also to have published Mancunium, a poem.

== Family ==
Burton married in 1792 Hannah Boyton, with whom he had ten children. The youngest, Edwin, was also known as a topographer.

== Notes ==
Attribution

This article incorporates text from a publication now in the public domain: Stephen, Leslie, ed. (1886). "Butterworth, James". Dictionary of National Biography. Vol. 8. London: Smith, Elder & Co.
