= Butterworth, Ohio =

Coordinates: 39°18′10″N 84°15′21″W

Butterworth is an extinct town in Warren County, Ohio, United States. It was located in Hamilton Township, west of Butterworth Road along the Little Miami River.

== History ==
A variant name was "Butterworth Station". The community was named after Benjamin Butterworth, the original owner of the site.
