= Edgar Ray Butterworth =

American funeral director (1847-1921)

Edgar Ray Butterworth (March 3, 1847 – January 1, 1921) was an American funeral director, believed to have coined the professional terms mortuary and mortician.

== A slow migration west ==
Butterworth was born in 1847 in Newton Upper Falls, Massachusetts. His paternal grandfather, Noah Butterworth, served in the American Revolution. His father was William Ray Butterworth; his mother's name was Eliza née Norwood, also from an old New England family. In 1857 his family moved to Wright County, Minnesota, where his father worked as a millwright for six years. This was during the period of the Sioux Wars in that frontier region. When the American Civil War, broke out, Edgar Butterworth tried to enlist but he was too young. In 1863, the family returned to Massachusetts.

From the age of 16—that is, roughly from the time of the family's return to Massachusetts—he was the prime breadwinner in his family. He worked for a time as a hatter; then, still in his teens and despite a limited formal education, he began to study law and was admitted to the bar in Massachusetts just after he reached the age of 21. In 1869, he married Grace M. Whipple, a direct descendant of William Whipple, a signer of the United States Declaration of Independence. She died only two years into the marriage, after bearing a child, Gilbert M. Butterworth.

In 1873, Butterworth moved to Saint Louis, Missouri, where he again worked as a hatter. Also in that year, he remarried to Maria L. Gillespie. They relocated to Fort Scott, Kansas and in 1876 to the rangelands of southwest Kansas, where he became a cattleman. He also hauled the bones of dead bison 125 miles (201 km) to the nearest railroad where he received US$10 per ton (907 kg).

There, on the plains of Kansas, he also had his first occasion to make a coffin. Traveling with his team and wagon, he encountered a settler in front of a "dugout" home, grieving for his wife and newborn child, both of whom had just died. With no lumber available on the grasslands, Butterworth fashioned a coffin from his own wagon box.

== Becoming an undertaker ==
In 1881 the Butterworths moved farther west, to Washington, arriving in Chehalis in August of that year. He came with the intent of engaging in stock-raising, but that enterprise was not yet under way in Eastern Washington and Butterworth correctly gauged that Washington west of the Cascade Range was not cattle country. Instead, he built the first steam-powered flour mill west of the Cascades. The following spring the Butterworths relocated a short distance to Centerville, (later Centralia), where Butterworth set up a small furniture business. He served as a member of the first city council of Centralia and later as the city's mayor; he also served two terms was in the state legislature. When an epidemic of "black diphtheria" hit the region, Butterworth was called upon to make coffins, which is the point at which he effectively entered the undertaking business.

Initially continuing in the furniture business, he also went into the business of selling coffins; he stocked a line of ready made coffins manufactured in Olympia, Washington. In 1892, by now a successful businessman, he relocated to Seattle, where he went into the undertaking business in a bigger way. He purchased a controlling interest in the Cross & Co. Undertakers located in the Masonic Temple that then stood on the northeast corner of Second Avenue and Pike street.

== E. R. Butterworth & Sons ==
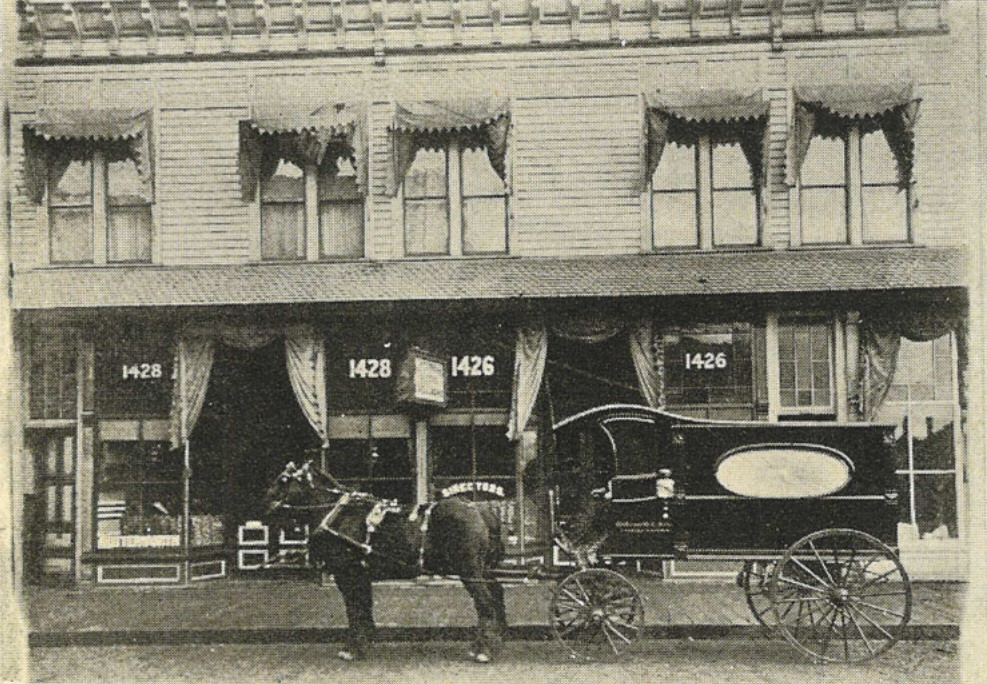
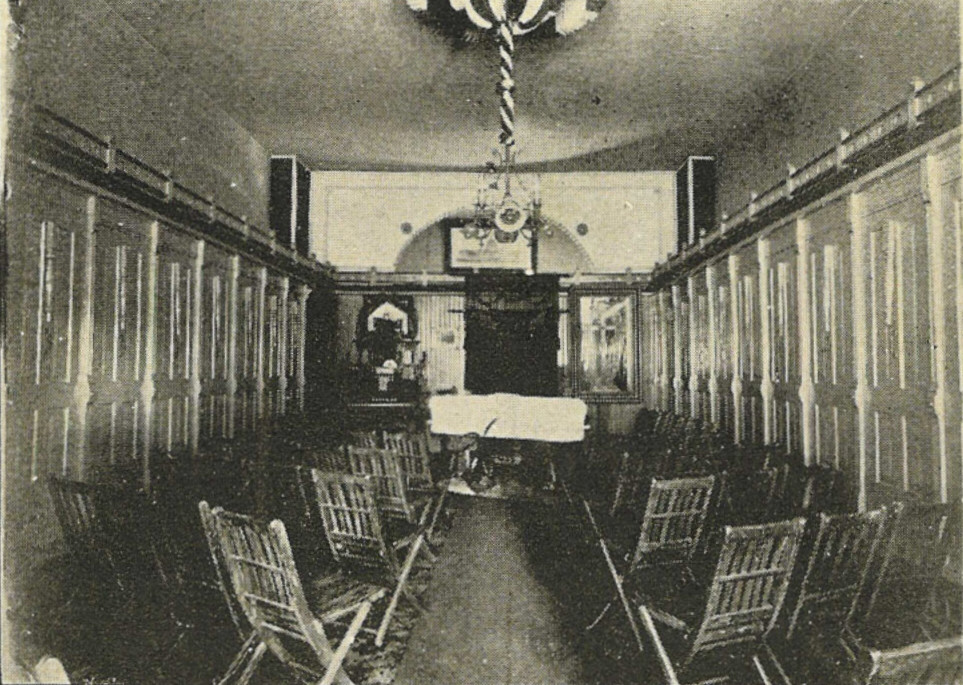

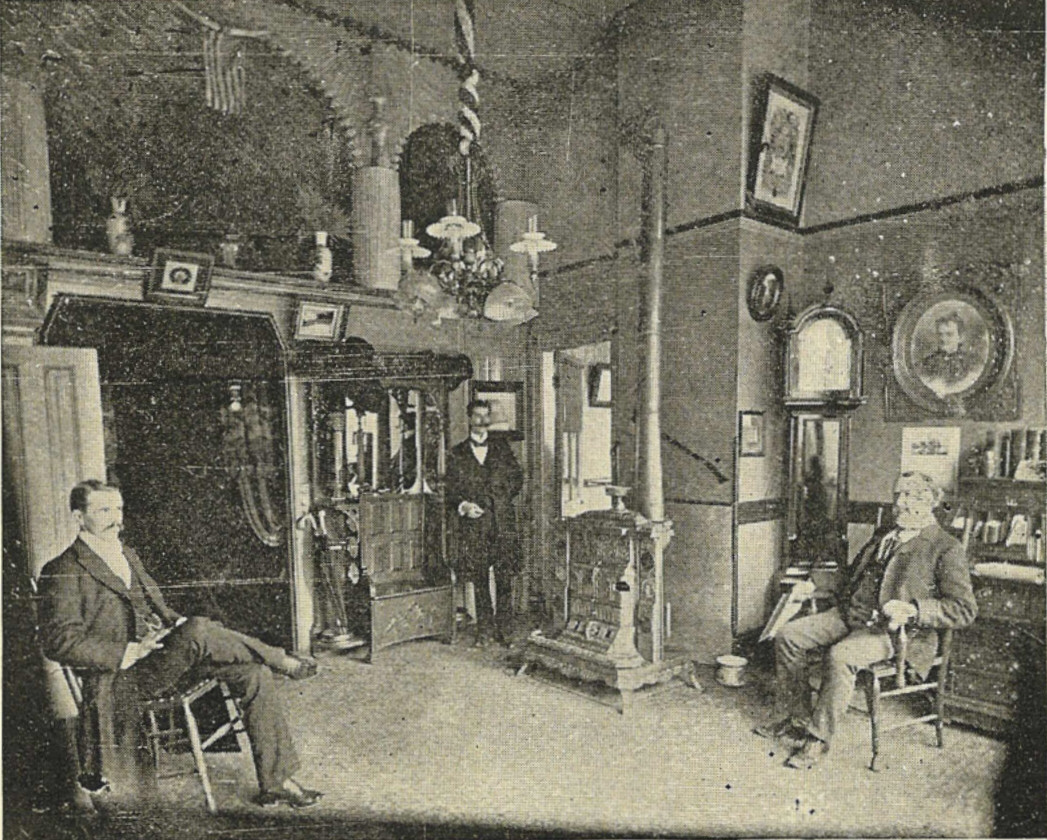
E. R. Butterworth & Sons on Seattle's Third Avenue in 1900

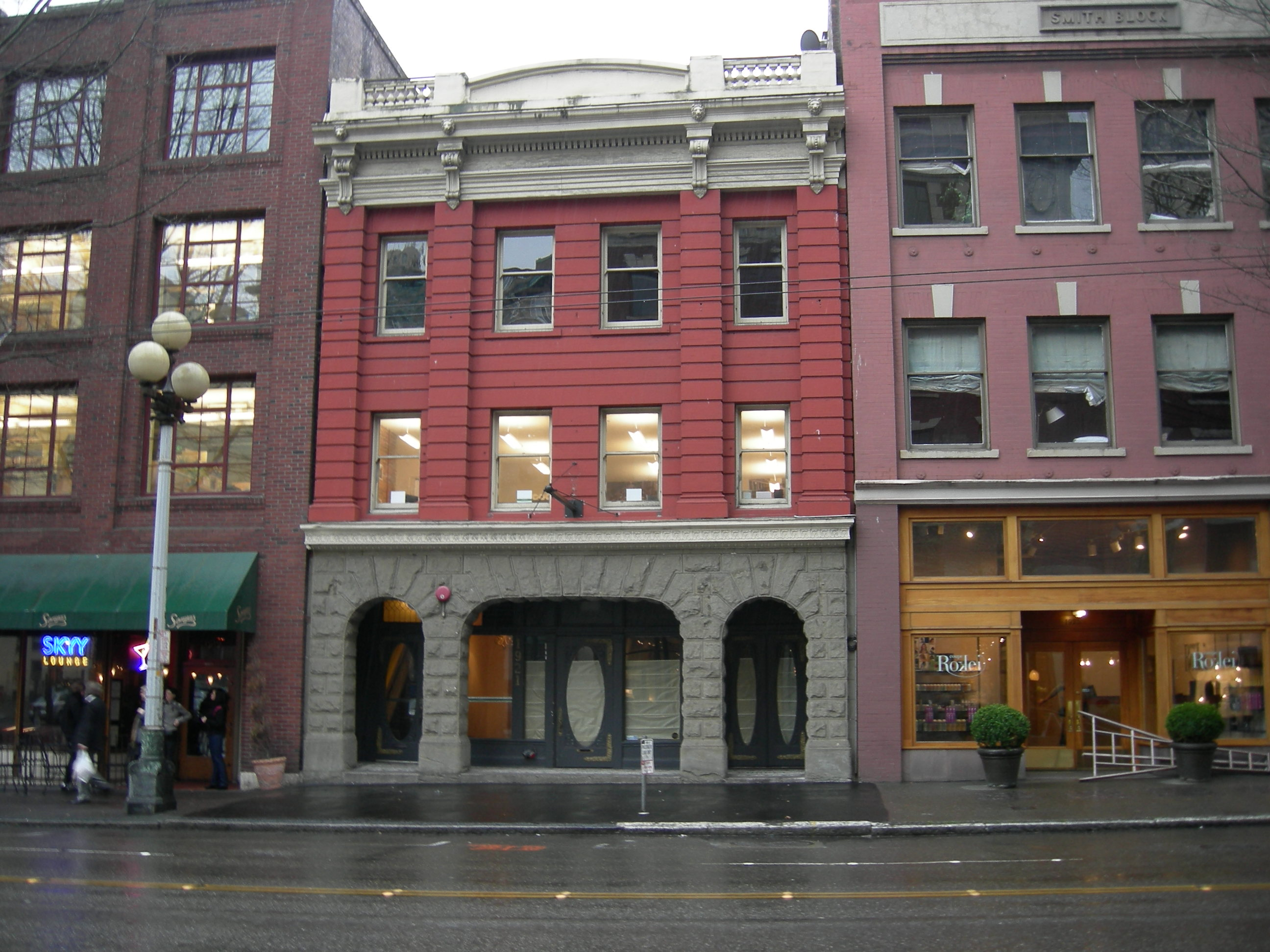
The Butterworth Block, photographed 2008

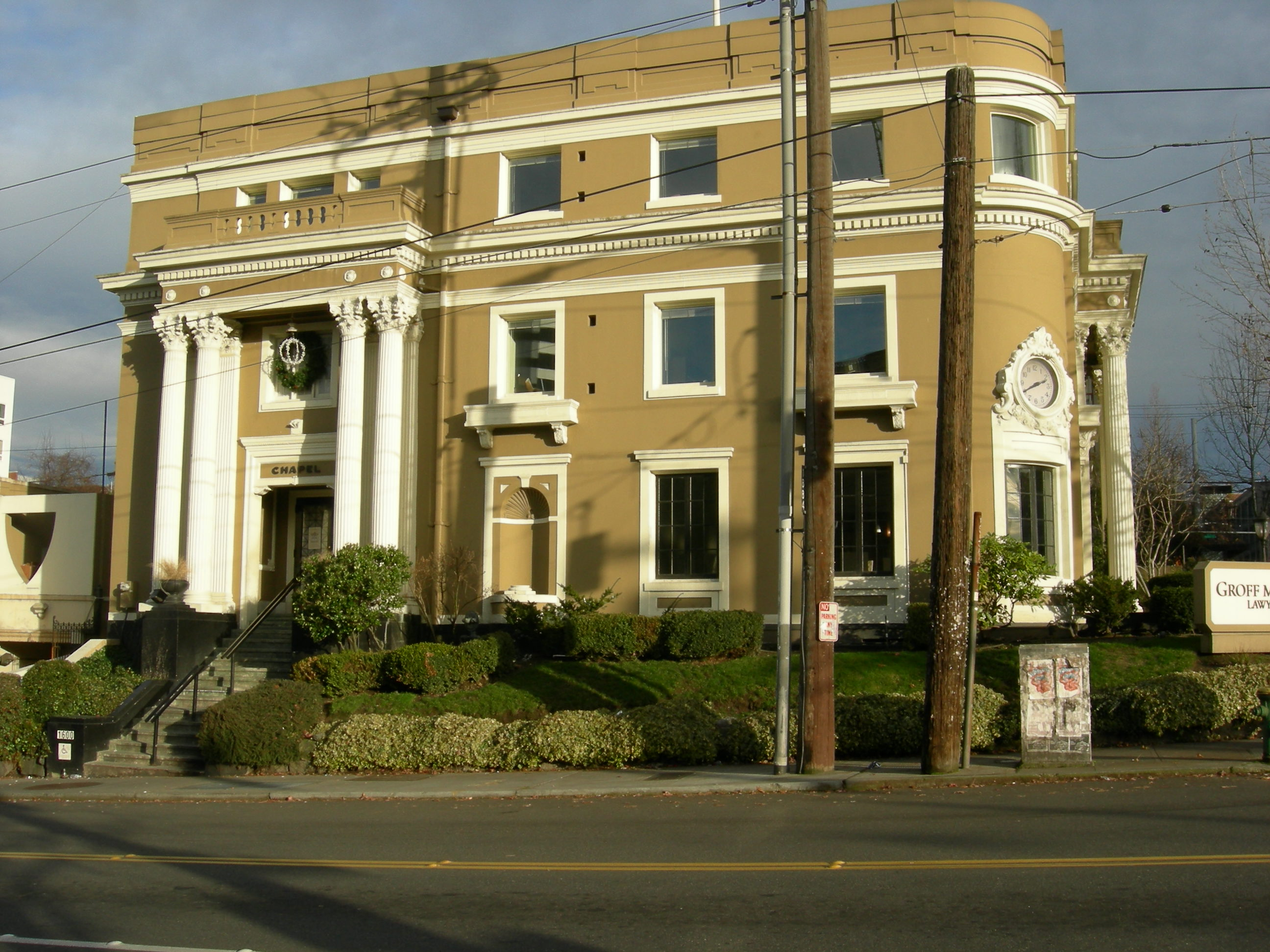
The Butterworth building at Melrose and Pine, photographed 2006. Now the Pine Box (left) and lawyer's offices.

The business was soon renamed E. R. Butterworth & Sons. Five of his sons joined him in the business: the aforementioned Gilbert Butterworth and his half-brothers Charles Norwood Butterworth, Frederick Ray Butterworth, Harry Edgar Butterworth, and Benjamin Kent Butterworth. Gilbert and Frederick would be the longest-lived, and were followed into the business by several of their own sons. By 1929, when Butterworth's son Gilbert was managing the business, it had already remained in the hands of a single family longer than any other Seattle funerary business. It would retain that status nearly until the family sold the business to New Orleans–based Stewart Enterprises in 1998, by which time it was one of the city's longest-running family-owned business of any type. The last Butterworth to run the business—which was by then Butterworth-Manning-Ashmore, after a series of mergers—was Edgar's great-great grandson, Bert Butterworth Jr.

From Second and Pike, the business moved to 1425 Second Avenue (later the 1896–1929 location of The Bon Marché department store); then to 1426-28 Third Avenue; and on October 1, 1903, to the custom built Butterworth Block at 1921 First Avenue. 1921 First Avenue now falls within the Pike Place Market Historic District, although the market was not founded until 1907. The building has been listed on the National Register of Historic Places since May 14, 1971.

The Butterworth Block or Butterworth Building was the city's first custom-built modern mortuary. Jeannie Yandel in 2009 described it as "The city's first place for comprehensive death-related services from corpse retrieval to coffin sales." The building had the first elevator on the West Coast of the United States, used to transport bodies. A 2008 Seattle Times article describes the building, still extant, as "[b]eautifully appointed in stained mahogany, art glass, ornamental plaster and specially designed brass and bronze hardware…" The basement, accessible through Post Alley at the rear, is now (as of 2009) home to Kells Irish Restaurant & Pub.

In 1923, the business moved again, to a building on the northeast corner of Melrose Avenue and Pine Street, also extant as of 2009. Clarence Bagley, writing in 1929, described the building as having a crematory and columbarium, fireproof receiving vaults, a funeral church and chapel, and drawing rooms, and utilizing "Cadillac motor equipment with special designed bodies" as their hearses, stocking "funeral furnishings… from the most simple to the magnificent." The former chapel of the Melrose mortuary now houses the bar The Pine Box. Whereas few traces 1921 First Avenue's original use remain at Kells, The Pine Box retains "leaded glass windows and enormous mirrors, ornate dark woodwork, vaulted ceiling, antique fixtures" and the original wood salvaged from the basement to build the bar top and tables.

Although the family is no longer in the business, the name lives on in the Butterworth-Arthur Wright Chapel at Mt. Pleasant Cemetery on Queen Anne Hill.

== Character ==
Butterworth was a pioneer of the modern approach to the business of undertaking. Clarence Bagley credits him as the likely coiner of the terms mortuary and mortician. He owned the first hearse north of the Columbia River. During Butterworth's lifetime, his business annually forgave the debts of customers who were not able to pay. Butterworth & Sons were also early adopters of the embalming techniques that now distinguish American funerary traditions from those more common in Western Europe.

He was a member of numerous fraternal organizations. He helped organize the Seattle lodges of the Independent Order of Odd Fellows and the Ancient Order of United Workmen, and was also a member of the Knights of Pythias, the Independent Order of Foresters, the Woodmen of the World, the Royal Arcanum and the Independent Order of Good Templars, as well as being a charter member of the Alaskan Brotherhood Association, and a life member Seattle's Arctic Club. He was an active member of Temple Baptist Church, but also a practicing spiritualist.

Inevitably, not all of the corpses handled by Butterworth had died peacefully. During the years of the Yukon Gold Rush (which began in 1897), parts of Seattle were dangerous and violent. Undertakers were paid $50 per body to take dead bodies off the street; Butterworth & Sons partook of that business. Butterworth, the city's leading undertaking business of the period, also handled many victims of the Spanish flu pandemic. Later, when health faddist doctor Linda Burfield Hazzard was convicted over one of the several patients she starved to death, Butterworth & Sons were implicated in the scandal, because they had cremated one of her victims, then produced a different, less emaciated body for the funeral. The mortuary was not convicted of any wrongdoing, but Hazzard went to prison.
