= Frank Butterworth (footballer) =

English footballer

Personal information
- Full name: Frank Cyril Buterworth
- Date of birth: 23 November 1914
- Place of birth: Barking, England
- Date of death: July 1999 (aged 84)
- Place of death: Wokingham, England
- Height: 6 ft 0 in (1.83 m)
- Position: Centre half

Senior career*
Years	Team	Apps	(Gls)
1935–1946	Barking		
- → Clapton Orient (guest)
1942–1946	→ Leeds United (guest)		
1943	→ Watford (guest)		
1946–1949	Walthamstow Avenue		
- * Club domestic league appearances and goals

Frank Cyril Butterworth (23 November 1914 – July 1999) was an English amateur footballer who played in non-League football for Barking and Walthamstow Avenue. He made two FA Cup appearances for Leeds United in 1946 and made over 100 appearances for the club during the Second World War.

== Personal life ==
Butterworth was stationed in Leeds during the course of his service with the British Armed Forces during the Second World War.

== Career statistics ==
Appearances and goals by club, season and competition
Club	Season	League			FA Cup		Total	
Club	Season	Division	Apps	Goals	Apps	Goals	Apps	Goals
Leeds United	1945–46	―	―		2	0	2	0
Career total			0	0	2	0	2	0
