= Oldham Local Studies and Archives =

- Interactive map of Oldham Local Studies and Archives
- 53.54073074655599°N 2.109518719240376°W
- Location: Oldham, England
- Website: www.oldham.gov.uk/info/200276/local_history/1856/archive_collections

Oldham Local Studies and Archives holds the archives for the town of Oldham. The archives are held at Union Street, Oldham, and run by Oldham Council. The archives date back to 1597 and include local authority records for the areas of Chadderton, Crompton, Failsworth, Lees, Oldham, Royton and Saddleworth.
