= Ben Butterworth =

Australian cricketer

Personal information
- Full name: Benjamin Butterworth
- Born: 2 May 1833; Rochdale, Lancashire, England
- Died: 6 January 1879 (aged 45); Chiswick, Middlesex, England
- Role: Fieldsman
- Relatives: Thomas Butterworth (brother)

Domestic team information
- Years: Team
- 1856/57–1861/62: Victoria

Career statistics
Competition	First-class
Matches	3
Runs scored	4
Batting average	1.00
100s/50s	0/0
Top score	2
Catches/stumpings	2/–
- Source: Cricinfo, 11 October 2020

Benjamin Butterworth (2 May 1833 – 6 January 1879) was an English-born Australian cricketer. He played three first-class cricket matches for Victoria between 1857 and 1862.

== Life and career ==
Ben Butterworth was born in Rochdale, Lancashire, and went to Australia in the 1850s. He established a business as a merchant in Castlemaine, Victoria, and married Eliza Hepburn, daughter of the prominent local pastoralist John Stuart Hepburn, at Hepburn's property at Smeaton on 9 March 1859.

In cricket, Butterworth was renowned for his fielding prowess in the position of long stop, which was an important position at the time, before the development of wicket-keeping techniques in the 1880s made it obsolete at the highest levels of the game. He was considered one of the best long stops in Australia, and "as good a long stop as anyone in England". He was chosen to play for Victoria for his long-stopping alone. Before Victoria's match against the touring English team in January 1862, The Age said: "Benjamin Butterworth, as long stop, is unrivalled in the Australian colonies. Takes the ball cleanly, throws in sharply and with certainty, and covers a great extent of ground." Of his batting it said only: "A wild bat, and cannot be depended upon for runs." In six first-class innings he made only four runs.

He captained a Castlemaine XXII to victory over the English team in March 1862. Two seasons later, in January 1864, he captained the Victorian XXII in a drawn match against the 1863-64 English team; he batted at No. 22.

Butterworth was appointed a magistrate in 1863. He returned to England with his growing family in the late 1860s and settled in Middlesex. When the first Australian cricket team toured England in 1878, he treated them to a trip up the River Thames to Windsor Castle. The Australian cricketer Tom Horan later recalled the trip as "a picnic which is still one of the brightest gems in my cricket memory".

Butterworth died at his home, "Smeaton House", in Chiswick in January 1879. Eliza survived him (and lived till 1923), along with their daughter and three young sons.

== See also ==
- List of Victoria first-class cricketers
