= Albert Butterworth =

English footballer (1912–1991)

Personal information
- Date of birth: 20 March 1912
- Place of birth: Ashton-under-Lyne, England
- Date of death: January 1991 (aged 78)
- Height: 5 ft 7 1/2 in (1.71 m)
- Position: Outside right

Senior career*
Years	Team	Apps	(Gls)
	Droylsden	?	(?)
1930	Manchester United	0	(0)
1932–1933	Blackpool	22	(5)
1933–1935	Preston North End	14	(4)
1936–1939	Bristol Rovers	98	(13)
- * Club domestic league appearances and goals

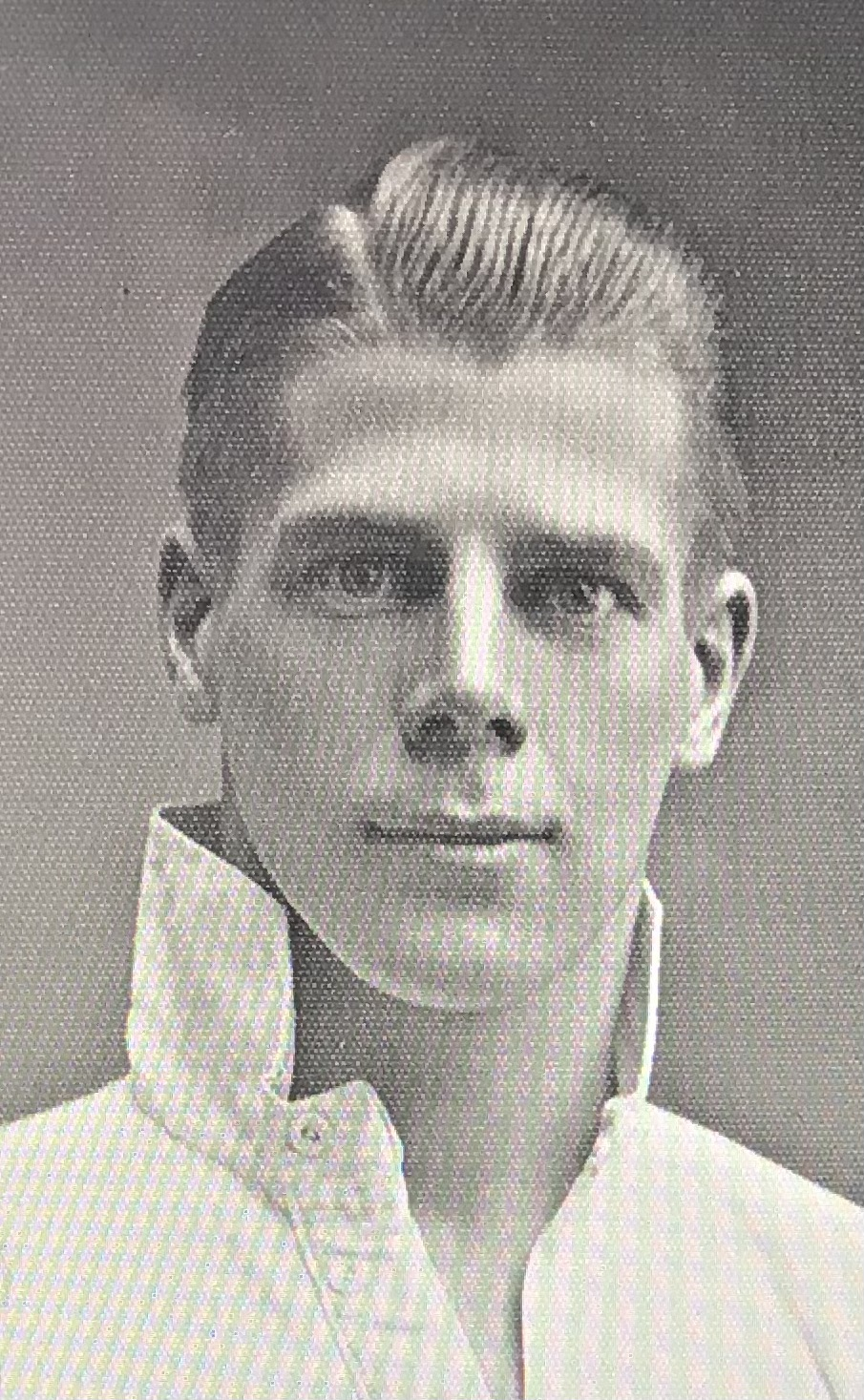
Albert Butterworth - Preston North End Team Photo c.1935

Albert Butterworth (20 March 1912 – June 1991) was an English professional footballer. An outside right, he made over 100 appearances in the Football League for Manchester United, Blackpool, Preston North End and Bristol Rovers.

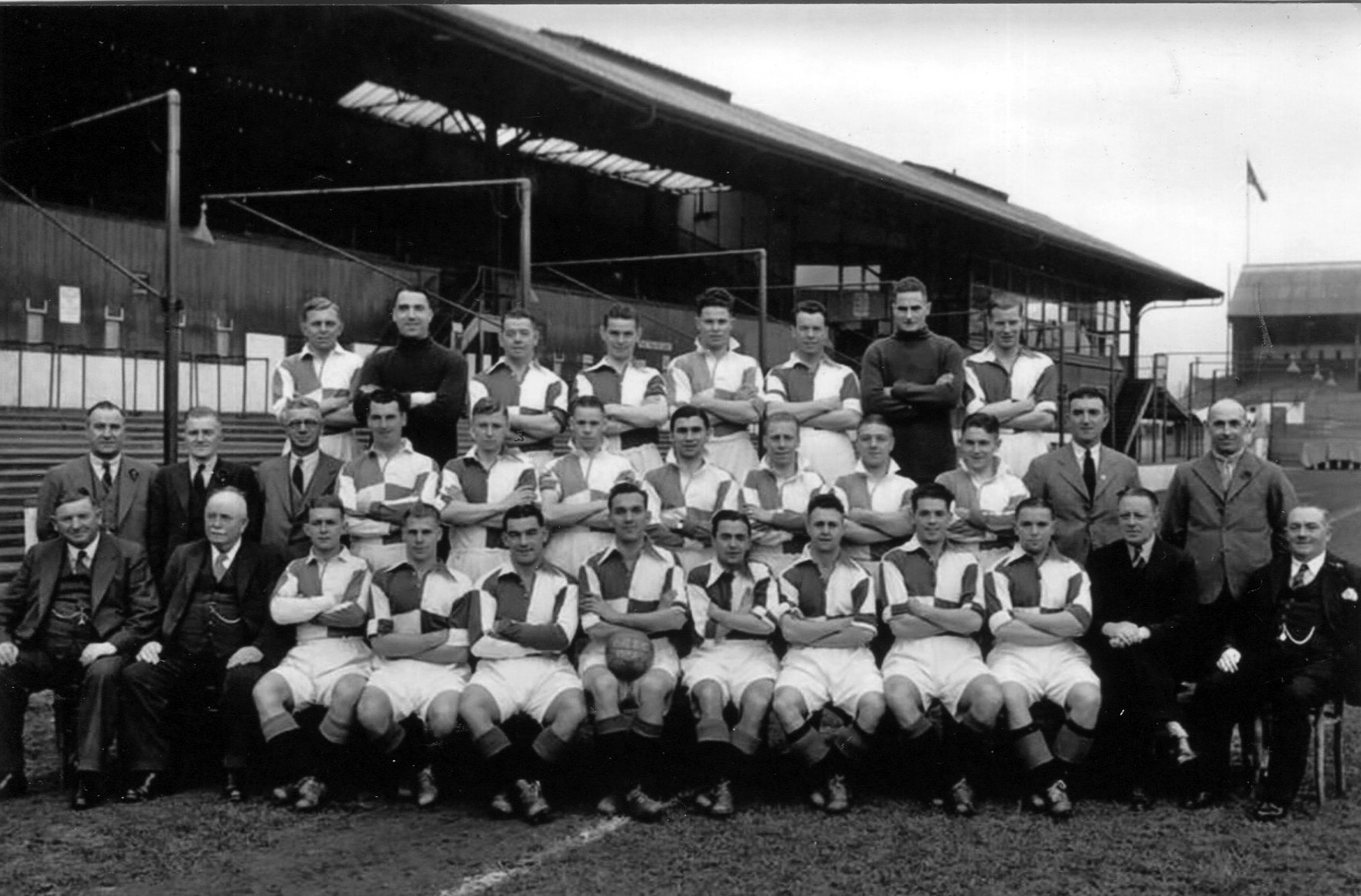
Albert Butterworth (Front Row - 4th from left)
