= Allen Butterworth =

British archaeologist and museum curator

- Allen Butterworth outside the Yorkshire Museum in 1970
- Born: 21 June 1939; Stockport, Cheshire, UK
- Died: 24 June 1974 (aged 35)
- Occupations: Archaeologist and Curator

Allen Butterworth (21 June 1939 – 24 June 1974) was a British archaeologist and museum curator.

== Biography ==
Butterworth was born in Stockport. He took undergraduate studies in Latin, Greek, and Romano-British Archaeology at the University of Leeds before a post-graduate diploma in Prehistoric European Archaeology from the University of London.

He joined Leicester Museums in 1964 before being appointed Keeper of Antiquities at Sheffield City Museums in 1966, eventually becoming the deputy director there in 1968. On 2 November 1970 he became the Keeper of the Yorkshire Museum, a position he kept until his sudden death on 24 June 1974. He was a member of the Museums Association and an examiner for the Museums Diploma, and was a member of the International Committee for Archaeology and History.

== Publications ==
- 1968. with Salter, A. and Sands, T. S., Souvenir guide. Sheffield: City Museums.
- 1971. "A Middle Bronze Age Dagger from Lindrick Dale, West Riding of Yorkshire", Yorkshire Archaeological Journal 42 (Part 168), 97-398.
- 1972. with Lewis, G. D. Prehistoric & Roman times in the Sheffield area. Sheffield: City Museums.
- 1972. "The Collections of the Yorkshire Museum", Annual Report of the Yorkshire Philosophical Society for 1971. 83–84.
