= George Butterworth (cartoonist) =

British cartoonist and book illustrator

- Born: January 5, 1905
- Died: 1988
- Education: Manchester School of Art
- Occupation: Cartoonist

George Goodwin Butterworth (1905–1988) worked as a British political, strip and sports cartoonist, and later a book illustrator. He often used the byline "GGB." Butterworth's lampoons of Hitler garnered him enough attention to place him on the dictator's "Death List." During World War II, his cartoon Maltese Cross in the Daily Dispatch gave groundswell to the island receiving the George Cross for heroism a week later (April 1942). An avid football supporter, Butterworth provided illustrations for the Manchester United F.C. programmes from 1933 until 1958.

== Early life ==
George Goodwin Butterworth was born on 5 January 1905 in Brinscall, near Chorley in Lancashire.

His mother was Edith Harris and his father Frederick W. Butterworth, a British parallel bars champion. George was their third son.

George showed promise as an artist and gained admission to the Stockport School of Art at age sixteen. He was accomplished enough there to receive a scholarship to the Manchester School of Art. According to his biography, his anatomical studies impressed local doctors.

== Career ==
Butterworth started his career aged 17, as a cartoonist drawing sports caricatures for the Stockport Advertiser, Cheshire Daily Echo, and County Express in the Stockport and Greater Manchester areas. He was offered full-time employment in 1923 with the Manchester Evening Chronicle. At this time he was signing his works 'Gee Bee'. From 1932 he drew for the Kemsley Group of papers, including the Daily Dispatch, and Empire News. During this period, Butterworth was illustrating stories for various newspapers and publications including programs for the Manchester United football organization, the Evening and Sunday Chronicle.

With war declared against Nazi Germany, in September 1939, Butterworth took the role as political cartoonist. His daily cartoons during this period proved to be so successful, both nationally and internationally that he soon came to the attention of Adolf Hitler and Benito Mussolini. Needless to say neither was impressed. During World War II his cartoon Maltese Cross in the Daily Dispatch partly resulted in the island receiving the George Cross in April 1942.

After the end of the second world war, Butterworth had to find new subjects. His attentions soon turned to Joseph Stalin, and the then perceived threat of the Soviet Union. During this time he also poured scorn on Prime Minister Clement Attlee and the 1945-1951 Labour Government. These years of austerity, rationing, world crisis, and financial upheaval were all easy ammunition for his popular daily cartoons.

Butterworth abruptly halted his relationship with the Manchester United upon the death of many of his beloved "Busby Babes," and fellow Manchester journalists in the Munich air disaster. He stated at the time that he could not find folly in it anymore

Between 1956 and 1968, Butterworth found regular inspiration writing a daily comic strip "The Daily Dees," which chronicled a family with two girls and a boy.

In his retirement in New Milton and Anglesey, Wales he painted in oils, mainly landscapes. He was reported at the time to have had a keen, mischievous political brain.

== Posthumous ==
An exhibition of George Butterworth's work was held at the Political Cartoon Gallery London September to October 2007.

In 2007 a biography by Timothy Benson of George Butterworth was published by the Political Cartoon Society entitled Butterworth: The Political Cartoons of George Butterworth 1938–1953 and includes over 200 of his editorial cartoons.

George's widow, Betty Butterworth, generously gave English Heritage a large collection of his original cartoons and ephemera. They are on display at their new home in Cornwall, Pendennis Castle.
