= Listed buildings in Manchester-M14 =

Manchester is a city in Northwest England. The M14 postcode area is to the south of the city centre, and contains the areas of Fallowfield, Moss Side, and Rusholme. The postcode area contains 59 listed buildings that are recorded in the National Heritage List for England. Of these, one is listed at Grade I, the highest of the three grades, three are at Grade II*, the middle grade, and the others are at Grade II, the lowest grade.

The postcode area is largely residential, and most of the listed buildings are houses, or originated as houses, and were later converted into other uses. Many of the large houses date from the middle and later part of the 19th century, and this reflects the commercial prosperity of the city at that time. In the area are colleges and halls of residence for university students, and some of the large houses have been converted for these purposes. The other listed buildings include churches, public houses and hotels, and a war memorial.

== Key ==
Grade	Criteria
I	Buildings of exceptional interest, sometimes considered to be internationally important
II*	Particularly important buildings of more than special interest
II	Buildings of national importance and special interest

== Buildings ==
Name and location	Photograph	Date	Notes	Grade
Platt Hall; 53.45048°N 2.22231°W		c. 1763–64	A country house, later a museum, in Georgian style. It is in red brick on a stone plinth, with sandstone dressings, bands, a modillioned cornice, and a hipped slate roof. The house consists of a main block with three storeys and seven bays, and single-bay three-bay links to two pavilions with two storeys and three bays. In the main block the middle three bays project slightly under a pediment, and in the centre, steps lead up to a tetrastyle Ionic porch with a pulvinated frieze, a moulded cornice, and a square-headed doorway. The windows are sashes, the windows above the porch with a pedimented architrave, the window above that with a shouldered architrave, and the others with flat-arched heads.	II*
174–178 Ladybarn Lane; 53.43650°N 2.21382°W	—	Late 18th century	A row of three brick cottages with a slate roof. They have two low storeys, a single-depth plan, and four bays. On the front are small rectangular bay windows under a verandah with wooden columns. The windows are horizontal-sliding sash windows.	II
Rose Cottages; 53.43875°N 2.21502°W	—	Late 18th century (probable)	A row of five brick cottages with a slate roof, two low storeys, a single-depth plan, and two bays each. On the front some cottages have porches, some have external privies, and at the rear each cottage has a small pantry window and a small stair window.	II
Platt Chapel; 53.44683°N 2.21871°W		1790	The chapel, once used by Unitarians and altered during the 19th century, it has since been used for other purposes. The building is in red brick with a corbel table, a slate roof, a red tiled ridge, and coped gables. It has a rectangular plan, with a north apse, and a wing and extension on the west. On the east side are three round-headed windows with imposts, at the south is a round-headed doorway and round-headed windows, and on the gable is a bellcote.	II
96 and 98 Ladybarn Lane; 53.43872°N 2.21444°W	—	Late 18th or early 19th century	A pair of red brick houses with a 20th-century pantile roof. They have two storeys with cellars, a double-depth plan, and rear extensions. On the front, both houses have a small porch and a segmental-headed transomed window on each floor.	II
132 Ladybarn Lane; 53.43768°N 2.21374°W	—	Early 19th century	A brick house with a slate roof, two storeys, a double-depth plan, and a symmetrical front of three bays. There is a central porch with Tuscan pilasters and a cornice. Above this is a blind window, and the other windows are sashes with flat-arched heads.	II
273 and 275 Wilmslow Road; 53.44963°N 2.22020°W		c. 1830–1840	A pair of stuccoed houses on a plinth, later offices, with a string course and a slate roof. There are three storeys, a symmetrical front of five bays, a double-depth plan, and a large rear extension. The outer bays are taller, and contain Tuscan columns on the ground floor, Ionic columns on the middle floor, and pilasters on the top floor, all engaged and with plain friezes. In the left bay is a porch and a door with a fanlight, and in the right bay is a window with an architrave. The windows are replacement casements with hood moulds.	II
4 Moon Grove; 53.45174°N 2.21928°W	—	c. 1833–1836	A house in brown and grey brick with a slate roof, and in Georgian style. There are two storeys with cellars, a double-depth plan, three bays, and a rear extension. Steps lead up to a round-headed doorway with a fanlights, and the windows are sashes.	II
6 Moon Grove; 53.45152°N 2.21907°W	—	c. 1833–1836	A house in brown and grey brick with a slate roof, and in Georgian style. There are two storeys with cellars, a double-depth plan, three bays, and a rear extension. Steps lead up to a round-headed doorway with a fanlights, and the windows are sashes.	II
5 and 7 Moon Grove; 53.45173°N 2.21880°W	—	1833–1840	A pair of red brick houses with a slate roof in Georgian style. They have two storeys with a cellar, a double-depth plan, and three bays. Steps lead up to round-headed doorways with fanlights, and most of the windows are sashes.	II
68 Platt Lane; 53.45088°N 2.22593°W	—	1835	A red brick house in late Georgian style, with a stuccoed ground floor and a slate roof. There are two storeys, a cellar and attic, a double-depth plan, and a symmetrical front of three bays. Steps lead up to a central doorway that has Ionic pilasters and a fanlight. The windows are sashes, and at the rear is a round-headed stair window.	II
66 Platt Lane; 53.45094°N 2.22566°W	—	c. 1835	A red brick house in late Georgian style, with a stuccoed plinth and a slate roof. There are two storeys, a cellar and attic, a double-depth plan, and a symmetrical front of three bays. Steps lead up to a central doorway that has Ionic pilasters and a fanlight. The windows are sashes, and there are two flat-headed dormers on the roof. In the right return is a pedimented gable containing a window with a pedimented architrave, and at the rear is a round-headed stair window.	II
Ladybarn Cottage; 53.43777°N 2.21373°W	—	Early to mid-19th century	A cottage and workshop in brick with a three-span slate roof. The cottage has two storeys and three bays. There is a central round-headed doorway with pilasters, a semicircular fanlight, and sash windows. In the workshop behind are various windows, including a canted bay window.	II
Behrens Hall; 53.44630°N 2.21684°W	—	1835–1838	A stuccoed brick house on a stone plinth, with sandstone dressings and a hipped slate roof. It is in Classical style, ann has two storeys over cellars, and a symmetrical front of three bays. In the centre, steps lead up to a porch with four Ionic columns, a moulded frieze, and a pediment containing an acroterion. The doorway has a square head and a fanlight, and the windows are sashes, the window over the door having an architrave with a cornice. On the right side is a canted bay window, and on the roof is a glazed dome.	II
Brook House, walls and piers 53.45784°N 2.22063°W	—	c. 1836	The house, later used for other purposes, was designed by Richard Lane in Gothick style, and altered in 1897. Is in stuccoed brick with a slate roof. There are two storeys, the original part has four bays, and it is flanked by later single-storey extensions. Most of the windows are sashes, some with Tudor arched heads, and there are mullioned and transomed windows. Other features include two-storey bay windows, one with a stepped parapet. The boundary wall has stone coping, and at the entrance are quadrant walls and stone piers.	II
2 Conyngham Road; 53.45669°N 2.21881°W	—	c. 1840	A rendered house on a plinth, with a sill band, prominent bracketed eaves, and a hipped slate roof. It is in late Georgian style, with two storeys, a symmetrical front of three bays, and a one-bay west wing. In the centre is a porch with pilasters, Ionic columns distyle in antis, a plain frieze, and a moulded cornice. The windows are sashes.	II
2 Wilmslow Road; 53.45765°N 2.22704°W	—	c. 1840	A house, later used for other purposes, in stuccoed brick on a plinth, with sandstone dressings, a frieze, elongated eaves brackets, and a hipped slate roof. There are two storeys, a double-depth plan, four bays, and a rear wing. The upper floor windows are sashes with moulded architraves and sills on consoles.	II
466 and 468 Moss Lane East; 53.45756°N 2.22967°W	—	c. 1840	A pair of stuccoed brick houses on a plinth, with pilasters, a rusticated ground floor, wooden eaves, and a slate roof. They have two storeys, a double-depth plan, a symmetrical front with two bays each, recessed lower one-bay side wings, and rear extensions. In the centre are paired porches with pilasters, a frieze with wreaths, a cornice with a blocking course, and doorways with fanlights. The windows have architraves and contain casement windows imitating sashes.	II
St Anselm Hall; 53.45436°N 2.21378°W		c. 1840	A house, later used for other purposes, in stuccoed brick with a hipped slate roof. There are two storeys and a cellar, and a front of four bays. The first two bays project forward and are symmetrical with a plinth, a frieze, and a bracketed cornice. Steps lead up to a central doorway with a moulded surround, a frieze with a keyblock, a moulded cornice, and a door with a fanlight, and the windows are sashes. In the other bays are a rectangular bay window and casement windows.	II
Victoria Park Hotel; 53.45335°N 2.22219°W		c. 1840	Originally three houses, later combined into one as a hotel, it is stuccoed and has a slate roof. There is an H-shaped plan, two storeys, and five bays. In the centre is a two-storey projecting gabled porch, with a plinth, a sill band, and a coped parapet. It contains a segmental-pointed arched doorway with a hood mould. In the outer bays are canted bay windows, and the other windows are sashes.	II
Ward Hall; 53.45678°N 2.22134°W	—	c. 1840	A house, later part of a college, it is in stuccoed brick on a plinth, with sandstone dressings, rusticated quoins, a sill band, a frieze, a dentilled cornice, and a hipped slate roof. It has a roughly rectangular plan with rear extensions, two storeys and a basement, and a symmetrical front of three bays, the middle bay projecting slightly under a pediment. The central porch has four columns, Tuscan pilasters, a frieze with a lettered panel, and a moulded cornice on consoles. The windows are sashes with architraves, and on the ground floor also with pediments. On the left is a recessed three-storey two-bay wing, and on the right is a two-storey bow window.	II
Whitworth Park Mansions; 53.45781°N 2.23642°W	—	c. 1840	A terrace of four stuccoed brick houses with a hipped slate roof. They have three storeys with cellars, a double-depth plan, and each house has three bays and two rear two-storey extensions. All the houses have a central recessed porch with Doric columns distyle in antis, an entablature with paterae on the frieze, and a doorway with pilasters and a fanlight. Some of the houses have canted bay windows, and the other windows are sashes with moulded architraves.	II
Buckingham Crescent, 114 and 116 Daisy Bank Road; 53.45861°N 2.21728°W	—	c. 1845	A pair of houses, roughcast and stuccoed on brick with a plinth, bands and a slate roof. They have an H-shaped plan, two storeys, and four bays, the outer bays projecting and gabled. On the ground floor are French windows, and above the windows are sashes. On the sides are porches, the porch of No. 116 having a frieze, a moulded cornice, a pedimented gable, and a round-headed doorway.	II
Buckingham Crescent, 118 and 120 Daisy Bank Road; 53.45850°N 2.21778°W	—	c. 1845	A pair of houses, roughcast on brick, with a band, a slate roof, and a U-shaped plan. There are two storeys with cellars, and a symmetrical front of four bays, the outer bays projecting and pedimented. Each outer bay contains a pilastered bay window, and in the centre is a French window. The upper floor contains sash windows, and on the sides are pilastered rectangular porches.	II
Former Church of St James; 53.44967°N 2.21450°W		1845–46	The church was closed in the 1980s, and has been converted for other uses. It is in sandstone with slate roofs, and in Early English style. It consists of a nave with a clerestory, north and south aisles, a chancel with a north vestry and a south chapel, and a southwest steeple. The steeple has a four-stage tower with clasping buttresses, and a broach spire with lucarnes.	II
Holy Trinity Church, Rusholme; 53.45016°N 2.22544°W		1845–46	The church was designed by Edmund Sharpe in Decorated style, and is built in yellow, brown and buff terracotta, with a slate roof. It consists of a nave with a clerestory, a west porch, north and south aisles, a chancel and a southwest steeple. The steeple has a three-stage tower with angle buttresses, a south doorways, three-light windows with crocketed gablets, an embattled parapet with corner pinnacles, and flying buttresses to a drum at the base of the octagonal spire.	II*
Langdale Hall and former coach house 53.45510°N 2.21971°W	—	1846	A former house in sandstone on a plinth, with bracketed eaves and a slate roof. It has two storeys and an attic, a double-pile plan, and three bays, the outer bays are projecting and gabled with bargeboards and finials. In the centre is a porch with a segmental arch, moulded jambs, and a brattished parapet. In the outer bays are canted mullioned and transomed bay windows. Attached at right angles to the rear is the former coach house that has 1 1/2 storeys, a segmental-pointed entrance, and a gabled dormer.	II
Addison Terrace; 53.45857°N 2.21550°W		c. 1848	A terrace of twelve houses, stuccoed on brick, with slate roofs and red ridge tiles. They have two storeys with attics, a double-depth plan, two bays each, rear extensions, and gables with bargeboards, some with finials. The houses have paired Tudor arched doorways with chamfered surrounds and fanlights, and ground-floor rectangular bay windows, and there are otherwise individual variations.	II
180 Ladybarn Lane; 53.43637°N 2.21388°W	—	Mid-19th century	A brick house with a slate roof, two storeys, a double-depth plan, and a symmetrical three-bay front. The central flat-roofed porch has a round-headed doorway and a blind window above. The windows are casements imitating sash windows.	II
Buckingham Crescent, 108–112 Daisy Bank Road; 53.45865°N 2.21664°W	—	Mid-19th century	A block of three houses, roughcast on brick, with a slate roof. There are two storeys and five bays, the outer bays projecting and with coped gables. In the middle three bays the ground floor projects, and contains a Tudor arched doorway with a blocked fanlight and a hood mould, and has a coped parapet. The windows are sashes. Each outer bay contains a canted bay window, and on the sides are gabled porches.	II
Eaglesfield; 53.45637°N 2.21701°W		Mid-19th century	A red brick house with rusticated quoins, sill bands, a bracketed eaves cornice, and a hipped slate roof. There are three storeys and a symmetrical front of three bays. The central flat-roofed porch has corner pilasters, a cornice and blocking course, and it contains a round-headed doorway with pilaster jambs and a moulded head with a keystone. On the ground floor are three-light windows with pilastered architraves and cornices, and above are sash windows with moulded architraves.	II
Newbury; 53.45880°N 2.21434°W	—	Mid-19th century	A stuccoed house on a plinth, later used for other purposes, with rusticated quoins, a string course, prominent bracketed eaves, and a slate roof with three small gables and finials. There are two storeys, three wide bays, and a single-storey extension on the left. In the centre is a pilastered panel containing a round-headed window, and a round-headed window above. In each outer bay is a rectangular two-storey bay window with a hipped roof containing sashes, those on the ground floor flanked by paired Ionic pilasters. In the right return are three wide bays, a 20th-century porch, and a canted bay window.	II
Norton Place; 53.43983°N 2.21961°W	—	Mid-19th century	A row of three stuccoed houses with sandstone dressings, corner pilasters, a sill band, bracketed eaves, and a slate roof. They have two storeys with basements and attics, a double-depth plan, eight bays, and rear extensions. On the ground floor are five canted bay windows, doorways with Corinthian pilasters, and round-headed doors with fanlights. On the upper floor the windows have architraves with keystones, and in the centre is a lettered plaque, above which is a gable with a round-headed window.	II
Park House; 53.45682°N 2.22248°W	—	Mid-19th century	A sandstone house with a slate roof, two storeys, and a symmetrical front of three bays, the middle bay projecting and gabled. In the centre is a single-storey bay window that has a parapet with a central upstand containing a shield. Elsewhere on the front and on the returns are two-storey bay windows, some rectangular, some canted, all with sash windows.	II
Summerville; 53.45842°N 2.21271°W	—	c. 1850	A house in Italianate style, stuccoed on brick, with a plinth, corner pilasters, bracketed eaves, and a slate roof. It has an irregular double-depth plan, two storeys with cellars, four bays, and a rear wing at the left end. The porch has paired Ionic piers, a frieze and a dentilled cornice. The windows are sashes with moulded architraves. In the right return is a rectangular bay window with Ionic pilasters, an entablature with a dentilled cornice, and a balustraded parapet.	II
Lodge and gateway, The Firs; 53.44383°N 2.21444°W	—	1851	Designed by Edward Walters, the lodge is in stuccoed brick with a slate roof. There are two storeys, a square plan, and two bays. In the right bay is a rectangular two-storey bay window, and to the left a doorway with an architrave. The bay window has mullioned and transomed windows, a gable and bargeboards pierced with quatrefoils. To the left is a small oriel window. The gateway has square gate piers with pyramidal caps, elaborate wrought iron gates, and curving brick walls.	II
The Firs and annex 53.44340°N 2.21401°W		1851	A large house designed by Edward Walters in Italianate style, built in stuccoed brick with slate roofs, and later converted into a hotel. It has an irregular linear plan, with two and three storeys over cellars. The entrance front has a string course, modillioned eaves, and sash windows with moulded architraves. The round-headed doorway has a moulded head and a volute keystone, and a fanlight. To the left is a link to the annex, the former coach house and office, and at the end is a three-storey service wing.	II
188 Ladybarn Lane; 53.43613°N 2.21411°W	—	1862	Originally a Methodist chapel, later used for other purposes, it is in red brick with sandstone dressings and a slate roof. The symmetrical gabled front facing the road has three storeys and three bays. There is a central square-headed doorway with fluted pilasters, a frieze with triglyphs and metopes, and a cornice. The windows have round heads, and over the central first floor window is an inscribed stone plaque.	II
Denison House; 53.45456°N 2.21898°W		1862	A house, later used for other purposes, in sandstone with slate roofs. It has an H-shaped plan with a side wing, and is in Gothic style. There are two storeys with cellars and attics, a main range of three bays flanked by gabled bays, and with a two-bay left wing. The porch has a Tudor arch and a hood mould, a cross-window above, and a Tudor arched stair window to the left. In the right bay is a rectangular bay window with mullioned and transomed windows.	II
High Elms; 53.45687°N 2.21971°W	—	Mid to late 19th century	A house, later offices, in red brick on a stone plinth, with sandstone dressings, a string course, and a slate roof. There are two storeys and a cellar, and a symmetrical front of three bays. The outer bays have coped gables, and the narrower central bay has a raked parapet. In the centre is a doorway with a Tudor arch, a moulded surround, hollow spandrels, a hood mould, and above is a decorated panel. The windows are mullioned with arched lights.	II
Rampant Lion public house and wall 53.45657°N 2.21568°W		Mid to late 19th century	A house, later used for other purposes, in red brick on a chamfered plinth, with sandstone dressings and a slate roof with an ornamental ridge. There are two storeys with an attic and a cellar, a front of three bays, with a slightly projecting wing to the left, and a larger wing to the right containing a two-storey canted bay window. The central doorway has a segmental head and a moulded surround, and the windows have quoined jambs and segmental pointed heads. To the left of the building is a high screen wall.	II
Marylands; 53.45629°N 2.22235°W	—	c. 1870	A former house in yellow and grey brick with dressings in sandstone and red brick, and a slate roof with ridge tiles. It has an L-shaped plan, two storeys and an attic, and three bays, the outer bays gabled. The doorway is elaborate, with set-in shafts, a fanlight, and a gablet with an apex finial. Most of the windows are sashes, and there is a segmental bow window.	II
Church of the Holy Innocents and St James; 53.44296°N 2.21978°W		1870–1872	The church is in yellow sandstone with dressings in red sandstone and a slate roof with green slate diapering. It consists of a nave with a clerestory, north and south aisles, a south porch, a chancel with a north vestry, a south chapel and an apse, and a free-standing southeast steeple. The steeple has a four-stage tower with angle buttresses, a south doorway, clock faces, corbel tables, corner pinnacles, and an octagonal spire with lucarnes.	II
Queen of Hearts public house (former Holy Innocents School); 53.44296°N 2.21877°W		1870–1872	The school has been converted into a public house. It is in yellow sandstone with dressings in red sandstone, and has a slate roof. It consists of a tall hall with gabled wings at the ends. The hall has buttresses and tall transomed windows rising to gabled half-dormers. In the east front is a gabled porch with a moulded surround and pilasters, and mullioned windows.	II
Xaverian College (part) and archway 53.45546°N 2.22208°W	—	1874–75	Originally a house designed by Alfred Waterhouse, it is in red brick with blue brick bands and a tiled roof. There are 2 1/2 storeys, a front range and a rear wing. In the angle is a rectangular tower with a gabled wooden porch, a Lombard frieze, and a saddleback roof with cresting on the ridge. The windows are sashes, some with balconies, and there is a dormer window with a half-hipped roof and a finial. Attached to the north side is an archway with a gable and a ball finial.	II
St Chrysostom's Church, Rusholme; 53.45755°N 2.21851°W		1874–1877	The church, designed by G. T. Redmayne in Early English style, is built in sandstone with slate roofs and red ridge tiles. It consists of a nave and chancel in one cell with a clerestory, north and south aisles, a south porch, a south chapel, and a small tower in the angle of the north aisle. The tower has an octagonal bell stage and a small spire. At the west end is a gabled porch above which is a statue under a canopy with colonettes.	II
Greygarth Hall; 53.45717°N 2.22140°W		1880–1890	A house, later a hall of residence, in yellow brick with sandstone dressings, string courses, modillioned moulded eaves, and hipped slate roofs. It has an irregular plan, two storeys with a basement and attics, and a west front of three bays. The outer bays project slightly, and between them is a three-storey stair tower with a round-headed window and balcony, and a pyramidal roof. In the left bay is a two-storey canted bay window, and to the right is a gabled porch.	II
Dalton Hall and forecourt walls 53.45692°N 2.21823°W		1881–82	A hall of residence by G. T. Redmayne, it is in stock brick with dressings in red brick, sandstone and red terracotta, sill bands, and slate roofs with red ridge tiles and stone copings. The hall has a long range with a south rear wing, three storeys, a basement and attics, and gables of varying sizes. Steps lead up to the doorway that has an arched head, a moulded surround and a hood mould, and above are ornamental terracotta panels. The windows are mullioned, and there is a stair window with a transom. The forecourt wall has low brick piers with twisted iron bars between.	II
Greenhayes Centre; 53.45660°N 2.23655°W	—	1896	A school, later used for other purposes, it is in red brick with buff terracotta dressings and a hipped slate roof. The building consists of a main range and two cross-wings under separate roofs. There are two storeys, the main range has six bays, and above the central two bays is an ornamental gable. On the roof is a flèche with a balustrade and an open lantern.	II
Westwood House; 53.45755°N 2.24353°W	—	1896	A block of six former almshouses in red brick on a double plinth, with terracotta dressings, a band, and red pantile roofs with coped gables and finials. They have an E-shaped plan, 1 1/2 storeys, a symmetrical five-bay front, and three rear wings. The windows are narrow with hood moulds, and the doorways have arched heads.	II
Christ Church, Moss Side; 53.45921°N 2.23614°W		1899–1904	The church is in glazed red brick with red sandstone dressings and a slate roof, and is in Gothic style with Arts and Crafts features. It consists of a nave with a clerestory, a west porch, north and south aisles, and a chancel. Rising from the left side of the west gable is a bellcote with chequer-board decoration. The west porch has three bays, with buttresses rising to octagonal pinnacles, and an openwork traceried parapet, and in the centre is a segmental-headed doorway.	II*
Former First Church of Christ, Scientist; 53.45796°N 2.21650°W		1903–04	Originally a Christian Science church, it was designed by Edgar Wood in Expressionist style with Art Nouveau details, and later used as offices. It is in red brick, partly rendered, with a slate roof. The building has a Y-shaped plan, with a main range and two splayed wings, and with a cylindrical turret with a conical roof in an angle. In the gable end is a semicircular-headed doorway with splayed sandstone sides, above which is a cruciform-shaped window. At the other end is a porch with a segmental-headed arch. On the roof are tall dormer windows.	I
Arched gateway, former First Church of Christ, Scientist; 53.45820°N 2.21640°W		1903–04	The gateway, designed by Edgar Wood in Art Nouveau style, is in red brick with some sandstone, and has a slate roof. It consists of a segmental arch with a steep gable containing a small semi-cylindrical oriel window. At the sides are canted buttresses with flat tops.	II
Hulme Hall (original portion); 53.45705°N 2.22350°W		1906	A hall of residence by Percy Worthington in Arts and Crafts style, in red brick with sandstone dressings and green slate roofs. It consists of three wings around a quadrangle, with a north extension. They are mainly in two storeys with paired gables, and most of the windows are mullioned and transomed with casements. In the east wing are two-storey oriel windows, and in an angle is a tower with an embattled parapet and an octagonal stair turret.	II
Ashburne Hall, lodge and gates 53.44602°N 2.21552°W		1910–1933	A hall of residence by Percy Worthington that was extended over years. It is in brick with details in stone and clay, and with slate roofs, and consists of blocks in a reversed L-shaped plan beside a quadrangle. The blocks are in two storeys with attics and gables, and most of the windows are sashes. The Alice Barlow Memorial Gates dated 1924 are in the boundary wall, they are elaborate, and in wrought iron; and the lodge, added in 1926, is in Regency style, and built in stuccoed brick with a hipped slate roof; both were designed by Hubert Worthington.	II
Synagogue; 53.44258°N 2.22158°W		1912	The synagogue, designed by Joseph Sunlight, is in brick and faced with sandstone, and has a slate roof. The main block facing the road has a gable and a copper dome, to the right is a tower, and to the right of this is a flat-roofed staircase block. The main block has a row of mullioned windows on the ground floor, and a large segmental-headed three-light window above. The tower is square with corner pilasters, a round-headed doorway with a moulded surround, above which is a rectangular window and a small lancet window. At the top is an open-sided cupola with a domed roof.	II
Fallowfield War Memorial; 53.44282°N 2.21936°W	—	Early 1920s (probable)	The war memorial is in the churchyard of the Church of the Holy Innocents. It is in stone and has a rectangular plinth with a smaller sloping plinth above. On this is a tapering shaft and a Celtic-style wheel cross. The shaft and cross have detailed carving. On the plinth is an inscription and the names of those lost. There is also a stone tablet with a bronze plaque, also with an inscription and names.	II
Appleby Lodge; 53.44916°N 2.21835°W		1936–1939	A group of three blocks of flats in Moderne style arranged around a central garden. They are in red brick with parapets and flat roofs, and have three storeys. The windows and door frames are in steel. The blocks at right angles to the road have rounded ends, and the other block at the east end has a U-shaped plan. The flats have cantilevered balconies, those on the ends being curved. At intervals are flat-roofed porches, and above them are recessed stair towers with full-height small-paned windows.	II
Hollings Building, Manchester Metropolitan University; 53.44723°N 2.21726°W		1957–1960	A college building by Leonard C. Howitt consisting of a classroom block, a restaurant block and a workshop block. The classroom block has seven storeys in a hyperbolic paraboloid concrete frame with brick infill, open above the top storey. The restaurant block is semicircular with two storeys, and the workshop block to the east has a single storey and a zigzag roof. In 1995–96 the central hall of the restaurant block was replaced by a library and offices.	II
