= St Chrysostom's Church, Victoria Park =

Coordinates: 53.4575°N 2.2185°W

St Chrysostom's Church
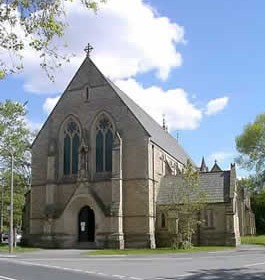
- St Chrysostom's seen from the northwest
- OS grid reference: SJ 85594 95658
- Location: Victoria Park, Manchester
- Country: England
- Denomination: Church of England
- Churchmanship: Anglo-Catholic
- Website: stchrysostoms.co.uk

History
- Status: Parish church
- Consecrated: 13 October 1877

Architecture
- Functional status: Active
- Heritage designation: Grade II listed
- Architect: George Tunstal Redmayne

Administration
- Province: York
- Diocese: Manchester
- Archdeaconry: Manchester
- Deanery: Manchester North & East

Saint Chrysostom's Church is the parish church in Victoria Park, Manchester, England. The church is of the Anglo-Catholic tradition, and also has a strong tradition of being inclusive and welcoming.

The church's patron saint is Saint John Chrysostom. It is one of three working churches dedicated in honour of St John Chrysostom in the Church of England; the others are in Liverpool and Peckham, S. London.

The church is in the Deanery of Manchester North and East within the Archdeaconry of Manchester, the Diocese of Manchester and Province of York.

== History and geography ==
The parish which St Chrysostom's Church serves, extends from Dickenson Road in the south, to Plymouth Grove in the north, from Wilmslow Road (west) to Stockport Road (east), and includes large areas of Rusholme, Longsight and all Victoria Park. St Mary's Hospital, Victoria Baths, the Chinese Consulate, Longsight Market, and a large part of the Curry Mile are all in the parish.

Historically the area known as Victoria Park was from 1850 included in the parish of St James, Birch, and remained so until 1878, when the new parish was created from parts of the parish of St James and others.

In 1836, a unique enterprise was undertaken by Richard Lane and Partners, architects, to establish a residential area to the east of Wilmslow Road, an "estate" of substantial houses in spacious grounds, where prosperous business and professional families could live. Lane was noted for his public work in the neo-classical style, for example his Chorlton-on-Medlock Town Hall. The facade of this building remains on the Manchester Metropolitan University All Saints Campus and now forms part of the Mabel Tylecote Building.

By 1850 about 50 houses by various architects had been built. Victoria Park contains examples of work by several architects including Alfred Waterhouse (Xaverian College); George T. Redmayne (Dalton Hall and St Chrysostom's); Edward Salomons (Hirstwood) and Edgar Wood (Church of Christ Scientist).

The park attracted well-known people during the 19th century, including Richard Cobden, MP, George Hadfield, MP, Sir Charles Hallé, Ford Madox Brown, the Pankhursts and Sir Arthur Roscoe, uncle of Beatrix Potter.

A church was included in line drawings issued by Lane in 1836. The building was started in the 1840s but was abandoned because the Victoria Park Company went bankrupt.

== Church building ==
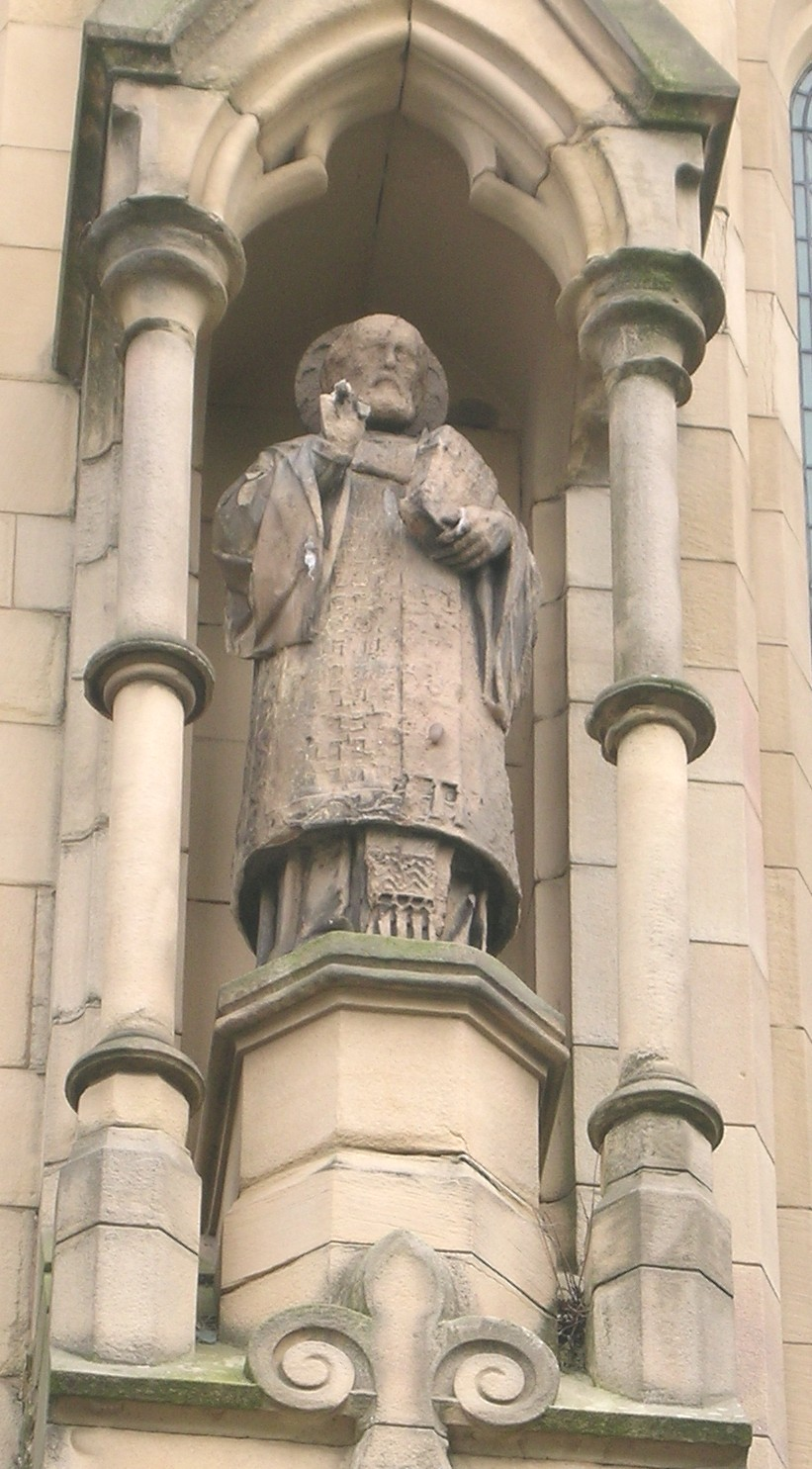
Statue of St Chrysostom at the Church

The church, in the early English style, was built to the design of George Tunstal Redmayne between 1874 and 1876 at a cost of £13,000. It was consecrated by the Bishop of Manchester, Bishop James Fraser on 13 October 1877.

The church was internally destroyed by fire during the evening of 1 October 1904. The installation of electricity was blamed as the cause, but was never proved. Rebuilding commenced under the guidance of architect John Ely. The work was done according to Redmayne's original plans, with only small variations.

During rebuilding the congregation of St Chrysostom's met in an "iron church" on the corner of Upper Brook Street and Daisy Bank Road.

Consequently, what is seen today, both outside and inside is the rebuilt church of 1906 with very little alteration. The building is Grade II listed.

Although the parish which the church serves has changed considerably since its foundation, the church has changed little. It remains significant and prominent in the landscape and life of the area, and commands a strong and notable position in the Victoria Park Conservation Area.

=== Stained glass ===
Most of its windows are the work of the stained glass artists Burlison and Grylls, influenced by the Pre-Raphaelite style. The windows in the nave and chancel have a uniform style, which adds a distinct character to the church. The pale elaborate canopies, detailed paintwork, dark robes and magnificent rich colours are characteristic of their work. Many of the windows depict saints of the British Isles, or great teachers of the church, such as St Augustine, St Ambrose, St Paulinus, St Hilda, the Venerable Bede and St Patrick. John Keble, and Edward Pusey, heroes of the Anglo Catholic movement are honoured with windows. In the chancel doctors of the Latin and Greek Church are honoured, including, Ambrose, Chrysostom, Athanasius and Augustine.

The windows have much detail, including heraldic devices, monograms, and, in War Memorial windows, reproduction of photographs. The saints' windows have appropriate symbols, and the saints often have simple text-bearing scrolls. The window of St John Chrysostom in the chancel is noteworthy: the patron saint is depicted holding a model of the church. Some windows in the Anson Chapel are the work of local Manchester artist, Walter Pearce. They represent a later period than those of Burlison and Grylls and have a distinctive use of colour. One window commemorates several of the major campaigns of the First World War. There is also a round stained glass window depicting angels in a rich art deco style.

=== Stations of the Cross ===
The Stations of the Cross are a later addition to the church fabric and are the work of Ian Howgate c. 1938. Howgate worked with the Faith-Craft studio of the Anglo-Catholic Society of the Faith. A similar set is found in Christ Church, Isle of Dogs, London.

=== War Memorial ===
The War Memorial consists of wooden panelling in the Anson Chapel, and was made by George Macfarlane and Sons of Manchester, to the design of P A Robson, architect of Manchester and London. The plaques were the work of Miss E Attwood. A granite slab was placed outside the main west door of the church ‘in order that adequate indication of the Memorial might be made.’ The memorial was completed in 1923 and was unveiled and dedicated on Sunday 13 May. At 11am the Dean of Manchester preached, and the memorial was unveiled by Lieut-Colonel G. B. Hurst K.C., M.P. At 3.15pm a ‘Special Masonic Service’ was held, conducted by the Archdeacon of Manchester and Rev. A. F. Aldis.

Two years later two windows, on the south and west walls were placed in the Anson chapel. They were the gift of J. S. Williamson, and are the work of the Manchester stained glass designer Walter J. Pearce. Their design complements the War Memorial. They were dedicated on 15 November 1925, by Revd Geoffrey Harold Woolley, V. C., M.C. and unveiled by Col. Sir Thomas Blatherwick, D.S.O. of the 6th Battalion, the Manchester Regiment.

Following the Second World War it was decided to incorporate the names of those who died in that war in two panels on either side of the existing five panels of the war memorial.

== The clergy ==
The first priest to serve St Chrysostom's as rector was Fr. William Marsden. Fr. Marsden had been curate to Archdeacon Anson, Vicar of St James, Birch, from which parish St Chrysostom's was principally formed. Archdeacon Anson was a leading tractarian priest in Manchester at the time, and no doubt his influence helped form the tradition which was to develop and remains at St. Chrysostom's.

Fr. Marsden was the longest-serving rector of St Chrysostom's. He was appointed in 1877 and died in 1899. The list of successive rectors is as follows: Fr. John Bernhard Steinlen Barratt, Fr. Clive Robertson Pattison Muir, Fr. Benjamin Pollard, Fr. Roland Harry William Roberts, Fr. William Preston, Fr. Robert Eric Charles Browne, Fr. Charles Challen, Fr. James Wardle Harpur, Fr. Ian Deighton Corbett, Fr. Michael James Gervase Melrose, Fr. John William Bruce Tomlinson and Fr. Ian Gomersall. Until 2025 Fr Lee Orsini was the Priest in Charge following Fr Gomersall’s long service. Fr Admos Chimwohu is the priest looking after the parish.

== The organ ==
The organ was built in 1906, the original organ having been lost in the fire of 1904. It occupies a chamber on the north side of the choir, and sports a front comprising the larger pipes of the great open diapason stops. The console is immediately below this front, behind the choir-stalls.

The organ is the work of William Hill & Son. It is used as the main accompaniment to worship, as well as for recitals and other concert use.

In 2006 the instrument was awarded a Historic Organ Certificate Grade II* by the British Institute of Organ Studies.

Since 1906, three alterations have been made:

- The hitch-down swell pedal was replaced by a balanced pedal
- A tremulant was added to the swell organ
- A Watkins and Watson 'Discus' blower and humidifier were installed (c. 1958)

It is an instrument of exceptional quality, substantially unaltered from the 1906 specification in both action and tone.

On the down side, the choir organ suffered rain-water damage in 1998 (the roof has, of course, been repaired) and has not been playable since. Furthermore, the instrument now being 100 years old, is showing signs of general wear to the extent that a major conservative restoration is required.

== See also ==
- Listed buildings in Manchester-M14
