= Robert Eric Charles Browne =

Belfast-born clergyman and writer

Rev. Robert Eric Charles Browne (11 August 1906 – 1975) was a Church of Ireland and later Church of England, clergyman, and a religious writer.

== Career ==
Browne was born in Belfast, the son of Canon John Edward Browne. He studied at Trinity College, Dublin and obtained a B.A. degree from Trinity in 1928 and an M.A. in 1938. In 1929, he was ordained a deacon in the Church of Ireland by the Bishop of Down, and he was ordained priest a year later.

He served curacies in Belfast, initially at St Luke's and then at St Thomas. In 1942, he was appointed Chaplain of Saint Columba's College, Dublin (in Rathfarnham). In 1946 he moved to London to become the Secretary to the Theological Colleges department of the SCM (Student Christian Movement).

Three years later he moved to Manchester and became Rector of All Saints, Gorton and in 1953 he became incumbent of the tractarian St Chrysostom's Church in Victoria Park, Manchester, from which he retired, due to ill health in 1959. Browne was appointed an examining chaplain to the Bishop of Manchester in 1952 and a Canon of Manchester Cathedral from 1964.

He died in Manchester in 1975.

== Works ==
While Rector of St Chrysostom's Church Browne wrote two books, Meditations on the Temptations and Passion of our Lord (1955) and the influential work The Ministry of the Word in 1958.
