= Greygarth Hall =

Listed building in Manchester, England

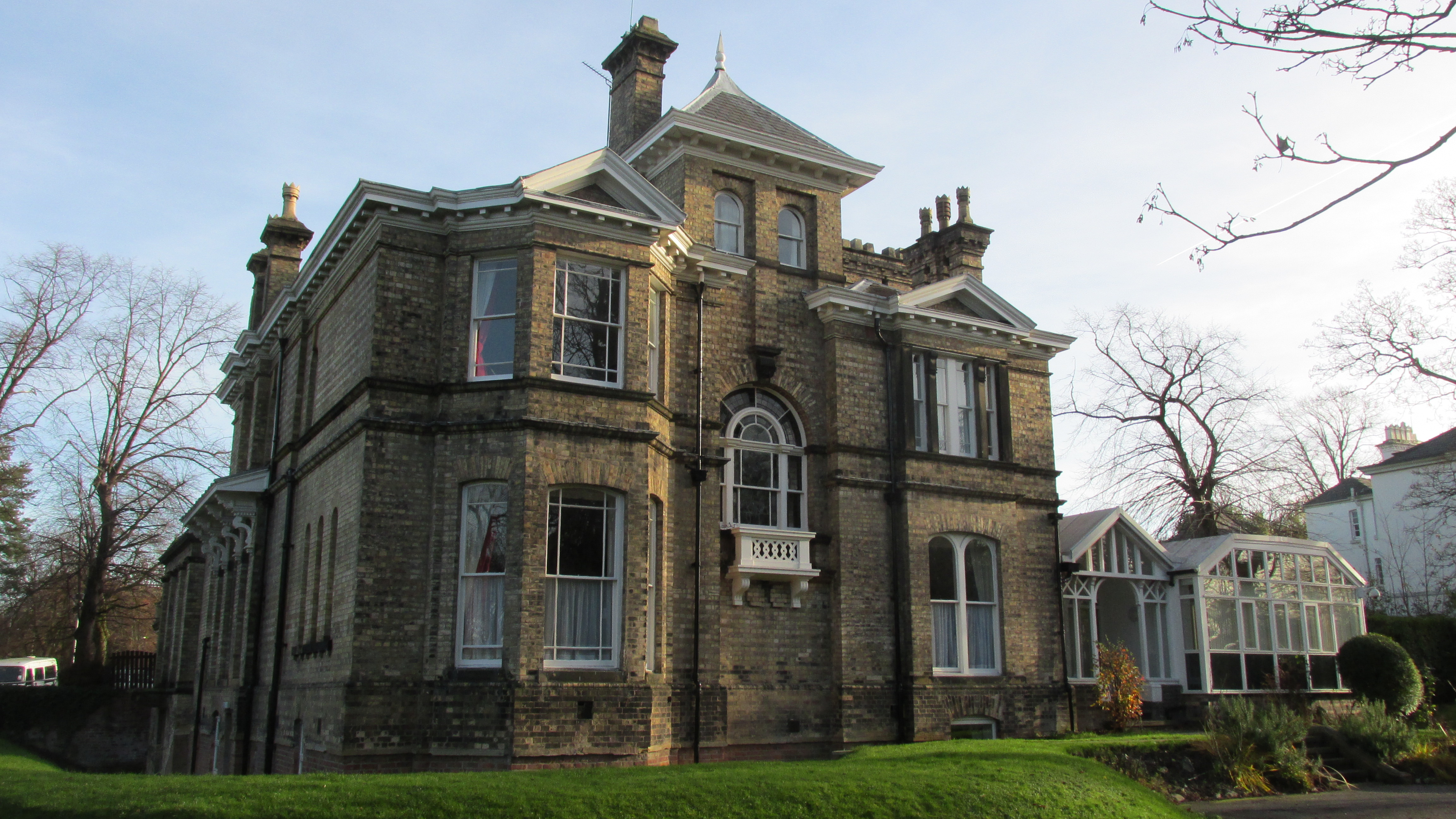
- Interactive map of the Greygarth Hall area

General information
- Type: Inter-university hall of residence for men
- Location: Victoria Park, Manchester, England
- Coordinates: 53°27′26″N 2°13′18″W
- Current tenants: 22
- Inaugurated: 1961
- Renovated: 2010–11
- Owner: Opus Dei

Design and construction
- Designations

Listed Building – Grade II
- Official name: Greygarth Hall
- Designated: 6 June 1994
- Reference no.: 1291317

Website
- www.greygarth.org.uk

Greygarth Hall is a catered inter-university hall of residence for men, situated in Victoria Park, south Manchester, England. It is one of the halls on the "Rusholme campus" close to the famous Curry Mile. Greygarth Hall was founded in 1961, and in 2010–2011 was extensively refurbished. The hall is a grade II listed building and was a University of Manchester Licensed Hall from 1965 until the university abolished the 'licensed' state in the early 2000s.

Greygarth is a voluntary organisation run by residents of Greygarth Hall University Residence, which is promoted by the Greygarth Association, a registered charity working for the advancement of education in the light of Christian principles. Among the various activities that take place at Greygarth, those of a spiritual nature are entrusted to Opus Dei, a personal prelature of the Catholic Church.

== Overview ==
Greygarth Hall is a corporate undertaking of Opus Dei, a personal prelature of the Catholic Church. It is, however, open to male students of all faiths and backgrounds. Greygarth has a large range of facilities; its own library, computer and laptop rooms, newspaper reading room, a large garden including a 5-a-side football pitch and a TV lounge. In autumn 2011, Greygarth Hall reopened after a year of extensive refurbishment.

== Spiritual activities ==
Daily Mass is celebrated in an oratory.

Other spiritual activities are organised such as seminars on Christian faith, retreats, and praying of the rosary.

== Notable alumni ==
The filmmaker Roland Joffé (born 1945) stayed at Greygarth Hall while studying in Manchester.

== See also ==
- Listed buildings in Manchester-M14
