= Queen of Hearts, Manchester =

Listed former pub in England

Queen of Hearts
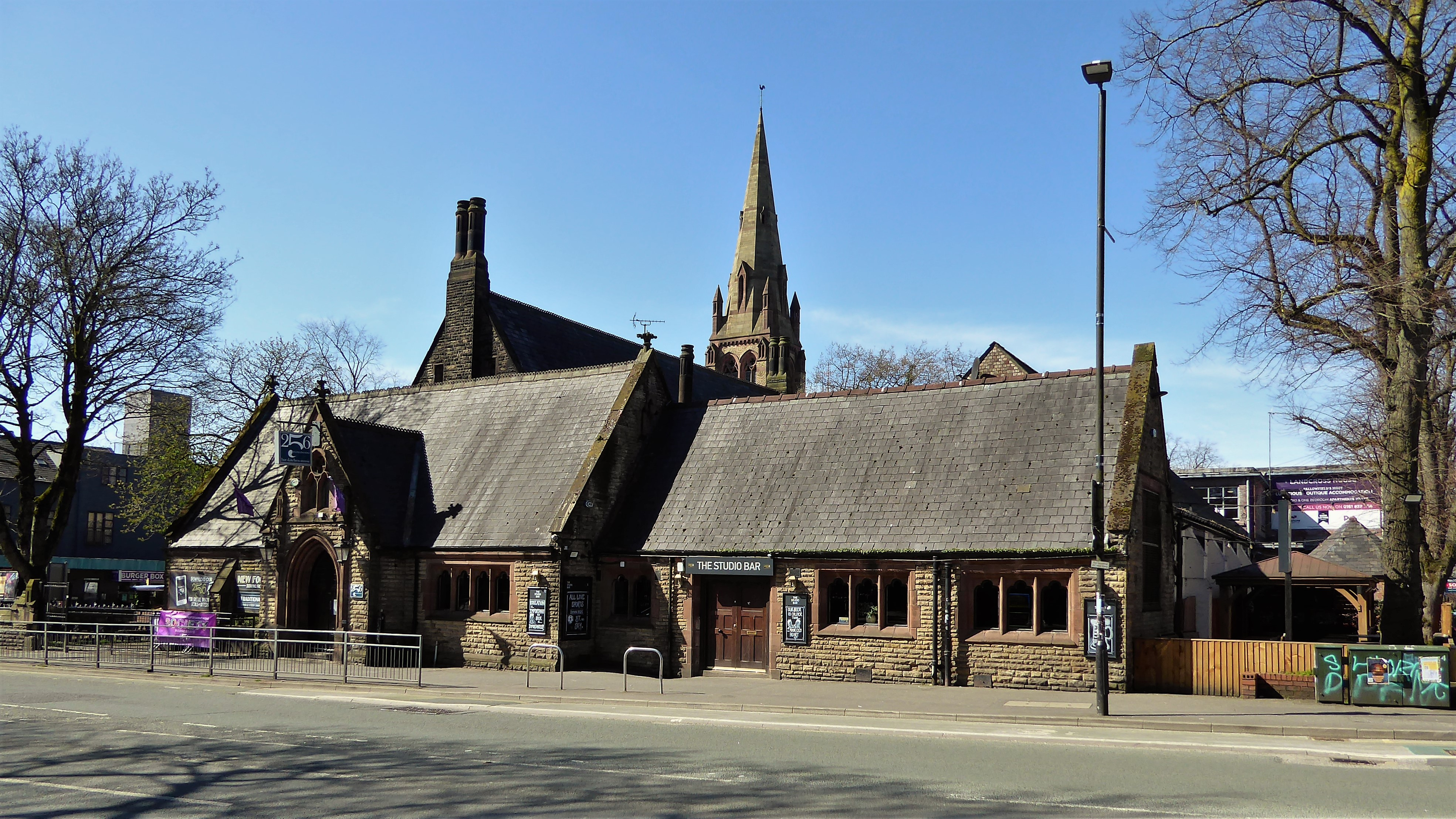
- The building in 2023, now a bar and venue

- Location within Greater Manchester
- Former names: Holy Innocents School
- Alternative names: 256 Wilmslow Road

General information
- Type: School (former); Public house (former); Bar and venue (current)
- Architectural style: Gothic
- Location: 256 Wilmslow Road, Fallowfield, Manchester, England
- Coordinates: 53.4430°N 2.2190°W
- Year built: 1870–1872; 154 years ago
- Renovated: 2011 (refurbished)

Design and construction
- Architects: Price and Linklater
- Designations

Listed Building – Grade II
- Official name: Queen of Hearts public house
- Designated: 6 June 1994
- Reference no.: 1254889

Website
- 256fallowfield.co.uk

The Queen of Hearts (now trading as 256 Wilmslow Road) is a Grade II listed building on Wilmslow Road in Fallowfield, an area of Manchester, England. Designed by Price and Linklater in the Gothic style and built between 1870 and 1872 for the Church of the Holy Innocents as a school, it was later converted into a public house, receiving its listing while serving that role, and now operates as a bar and venue.

== History ==
The building was designed by the architectural partnership Price and Linklater, who also designed the adjacent Church of the Holy Innocents. It was constructed between 1870 and 1872 as a church school serving the Fallowfield parish. It continued in educational use into the 20th century before later being adapted for licensed premises. By the later 20th century it was trading as the Queen of Hearts public house. On 6 June 1994, the building was designated a Grade II listed structure.

In April 2011, Hydes Brewery acquired the premises and reopened them in September of the same year. The interior featured a lobby leading into a large space formed from the former church hall. Hydes sold the venue in 2015, after which it became an independent operation, and the physical link between the two buildings was removed at that time.

Following its sale, the premises continued to operate as a bar and events space. It now trades as 256 Wilmslow Road, occupying the former school building.

== Architecture ==
The building is constructed of yellow sandstone with red stone detailing and has a steep slate roof. Its layout is mainly rectangular, running east to west, with an additional wing at the north‑east corner. The design follows a Gothic approach. The main part is a tall single‑storey hall divided into five sections, with lower gabled wings at each end. The hall has buttresses, a low roofline, and tall windows that extend into small gabled projections. The gables of the wings contain paired windows.

The east side of the east wing, facing Wilmslow Road, includes a gabled entrance porch with a pointed arch doorway and a small two‑part window above it, flanked by octagonal shafts. To the right is a recessed three‑bay section with a series of stone‑framed windows of varying widths, each with trefoil‑shaped heads.

== See also ==
- Listed buildings in Manchester-M14
- Listed pubs in Manchester
