= Edgar Wood Centre =

Church building in Manchester, England

Coordinates: 53.4579°N 2.2164°W

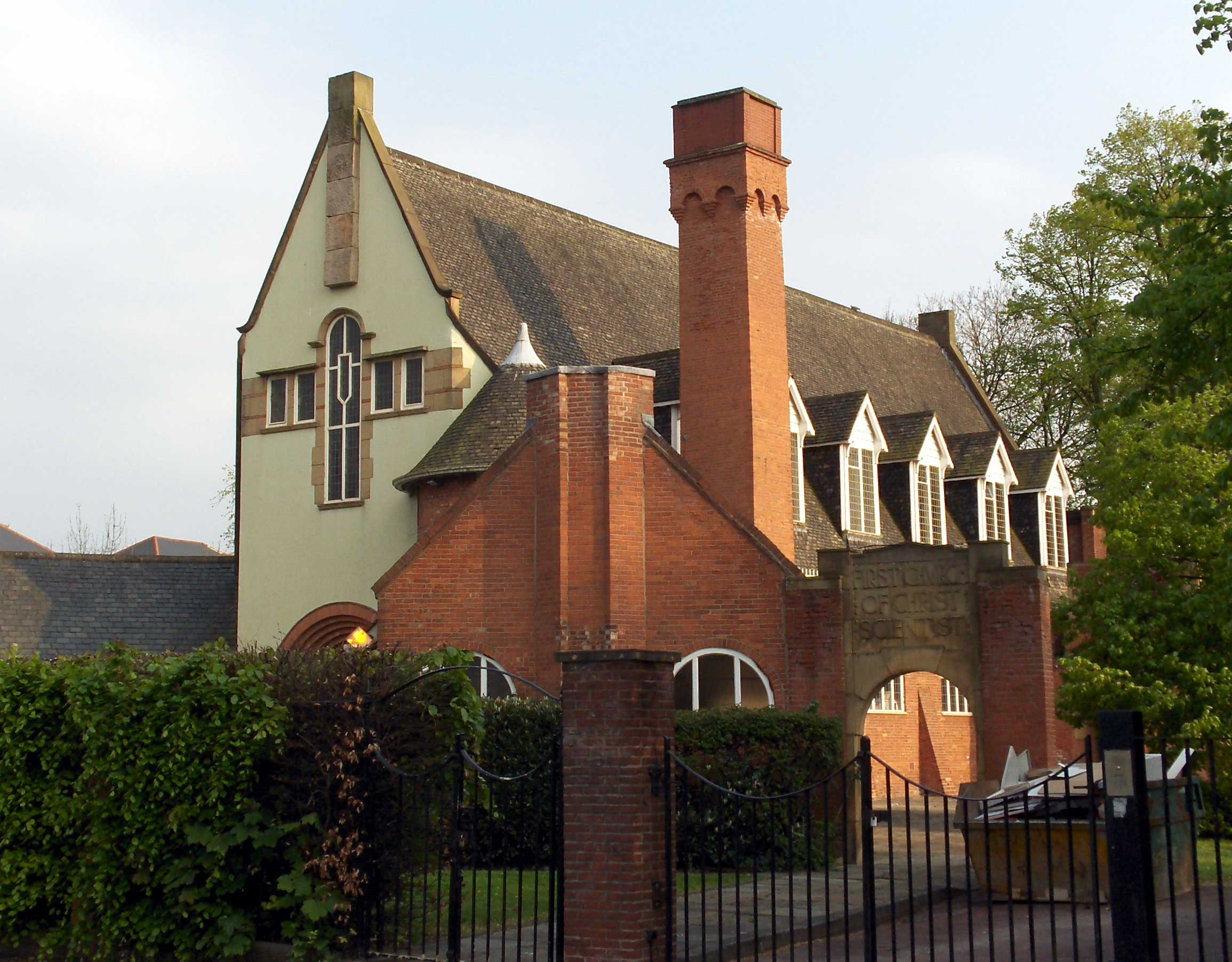
- Side view of the church

- Location in Greater Manchester
- OS grid reference: SJ 85729 95702
- Location: Victoria Park, Manchester
- Country: England
- Denomination: Universal Church of the Kingdom of God

Architecture
- Functional status: Active
- Heritage designation: Grade I
- Designated: 18 December 1963
- Architect: Edgar Wood
- Architectural type: Church
- Groundbreaking: 1903

The Edgar Wood Centre (now Daisy Bank Manor) is a former Church of Christ, Scientist building in Victoria Park, Manchester, England. The church was designed by Edgar Wood in 1903. Nikolaus Pevsner considered it "the only religious building in Lancashire that would be indispensable in a survey of twentieth century church design in all England". It is a Grade I listed building and has been on the Heritage at Risk Register published by Historic England.

== History ==
The building was designed by the architect Edgar Wood for the Christian Scientists' first church in Britain. Construction began in 1903–4. A shortage of space and money led to modifications to the design, and further work took place in 1905–7.

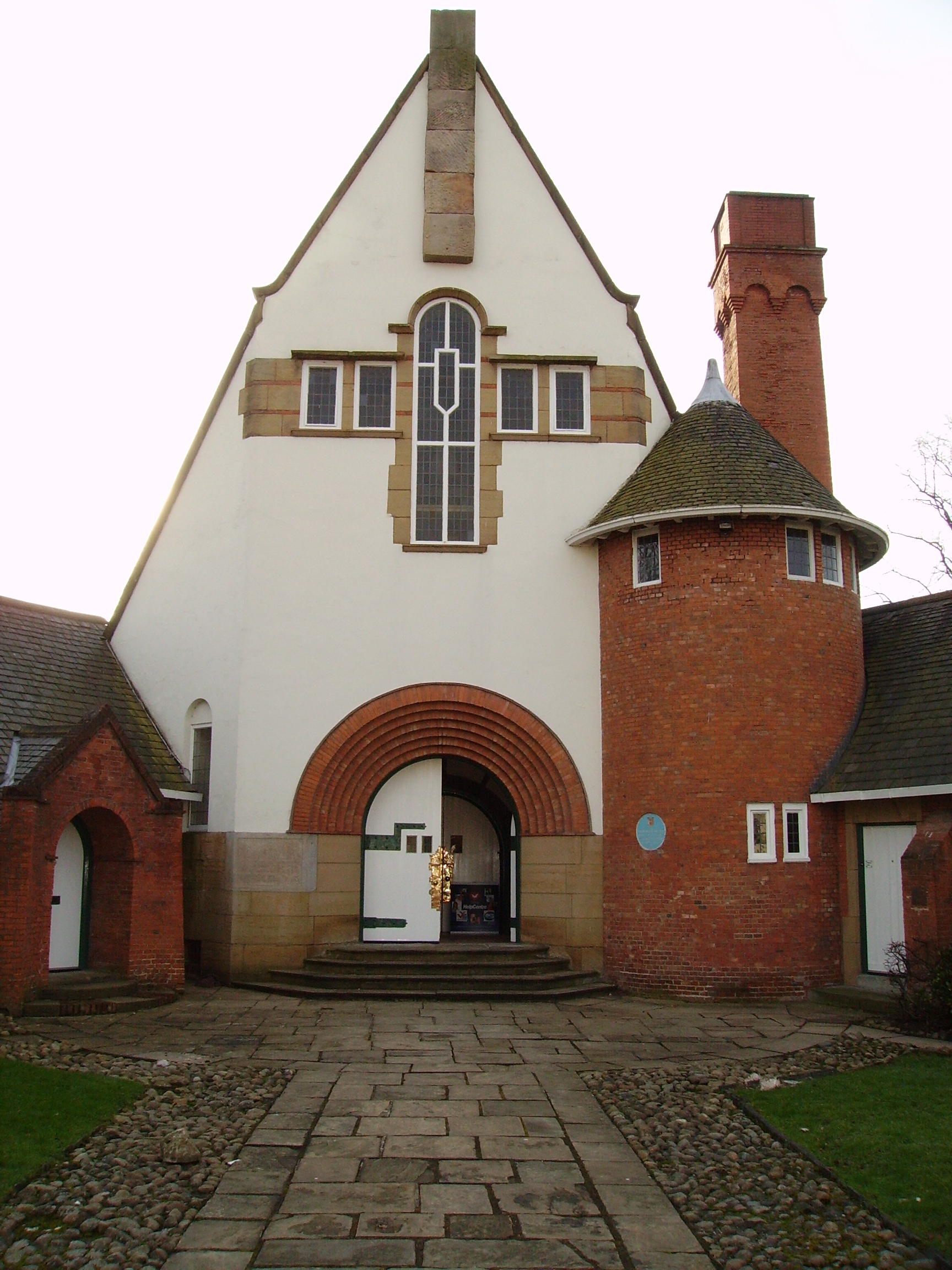
Edgar Wood Centre: the gateway

Pevsner described the church as "one of the most original buildings of that time in England, or indeed anywhere". The church was decorated by bronze lettering of parts of the Bible and works by Mary Baker Eddy, an Arabic organ screen, and chairs designed by Wood.

It was designed by Edgar Wood in Expressionist style with Art Nouveau details, and later used as offices. It is in red brick, partly rendered, with a slate roof. The building has a Y-shaped plan, with a main range and two splayed wings, and with a cylindrical turret with a conical roof in an angle. In the gable end is a semicircular-headed doorway with splayed sandstone sides, above which is a cruciform-shaped window. At the other end is a porch with a segmental-headed arch. In the roof are tall dormer windows.

The Grade-II listed gateway, designed by Wood in Art Nouveau style, is also red brick with some sandstone, and a slate roof. It consists of a segmental arch with a steep gable containing a small semi-cylindrical oriel window. At the sides are canted buttresses with flat tops. There is a blue plaque to Wood on the gateway.

The church closed in 1971 and was heavily vandalised before reopening as the Edgar Wood Centre in 1975. In turn, this closed in 2003, and the building was then used as a Universal Church of the Kingdom of God centre. The centre currently (2024) operates as a wedding and event venue under the name of Daisy Bank Manor. It was placed on the English Heritage Register of Buildings at Risk 2007, but is no longer listed as "At Risk". The church has been a Grade I listed building since 18 December 1963. Most of the furnishings and stained glass have been removed.

== See also ==
- Grade I listed churches in Greater Manchester
- Listed buildings in Manchester-M14
