= George Tunstal Redmayne =

British architect (1840–1912)

G. T. Redmayne
- Born: George Tunstal Redmayne; 27 December 1840; Highgate, London, England
- Died: 21 August 1912; Haslemere, Surrey, England
- Education: Tonbridge School
- Occupation: Architect
- Parents: Giles Redmayne (father); Margareta Robey (mother)
- Buildings: St Chrysostom's Church; Dalton Hall; Manchester Tennis and Racquet Club; Manchester School of Art

George Tunstal Redmayne, more usually G. T. Redmayne (1840–1912), was the youngest of four sons of Giles Redmayne and his wife, Margareta Robey. He was born in London and attended Tonbridge School for two years before being educated by private tutors. His father was a wealthy linen draper and silk mercer who owned a house in London and Brathay Hall in the Lake District, where he employed architect Alfred Waterhouse in the mid-1850s. Redmayne became Waterhouse's pupil in 1859 and remained with him as his assistant. He married Waterhouse's sister, Katherine, in 1870; they had two sons, Martin (born 1871) and Leonard (born 1877). Redmayne died at his residence, Great Stoakley in Haselmere, in 1912.

Redmayne ran Waterhouse's Manchester office after Waterhouse opened another in London. He established an independent practice in Manchester in the late 1860s and, by 1869, had an office in the Royal Insurance Buildings on King Street. He continued to practise in the city until 1894, when he moved to Surrey. Waterhouse proposed him as an Associate of the Royal Institute of British Architects (RIBA) in 1872 and as a Fellow in 1877. He served as President of the Manchester Society of Architects in 1886.

His commissions in Manchester included the neo-Gothic St Andrew's Chambers on the corner of Albert Square, built in 1874 for Scottish Widows Life Assurance Society, and the Manchester School of Art on Cavendish Street built in 1880–01, also in the neo-Gothic style. He designed St Chrysostom's Church, constructed between 1874 and 1877 in Victoria Park, where he also designed Dalton Hall, a university hall of residence, in 1882. All these buildings are designated Grade II by Historic England.

== Gallery of architectural work ==
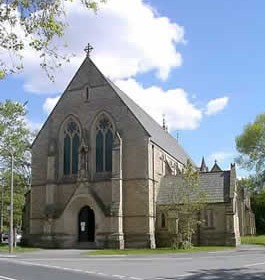
St Chrysostom's Church

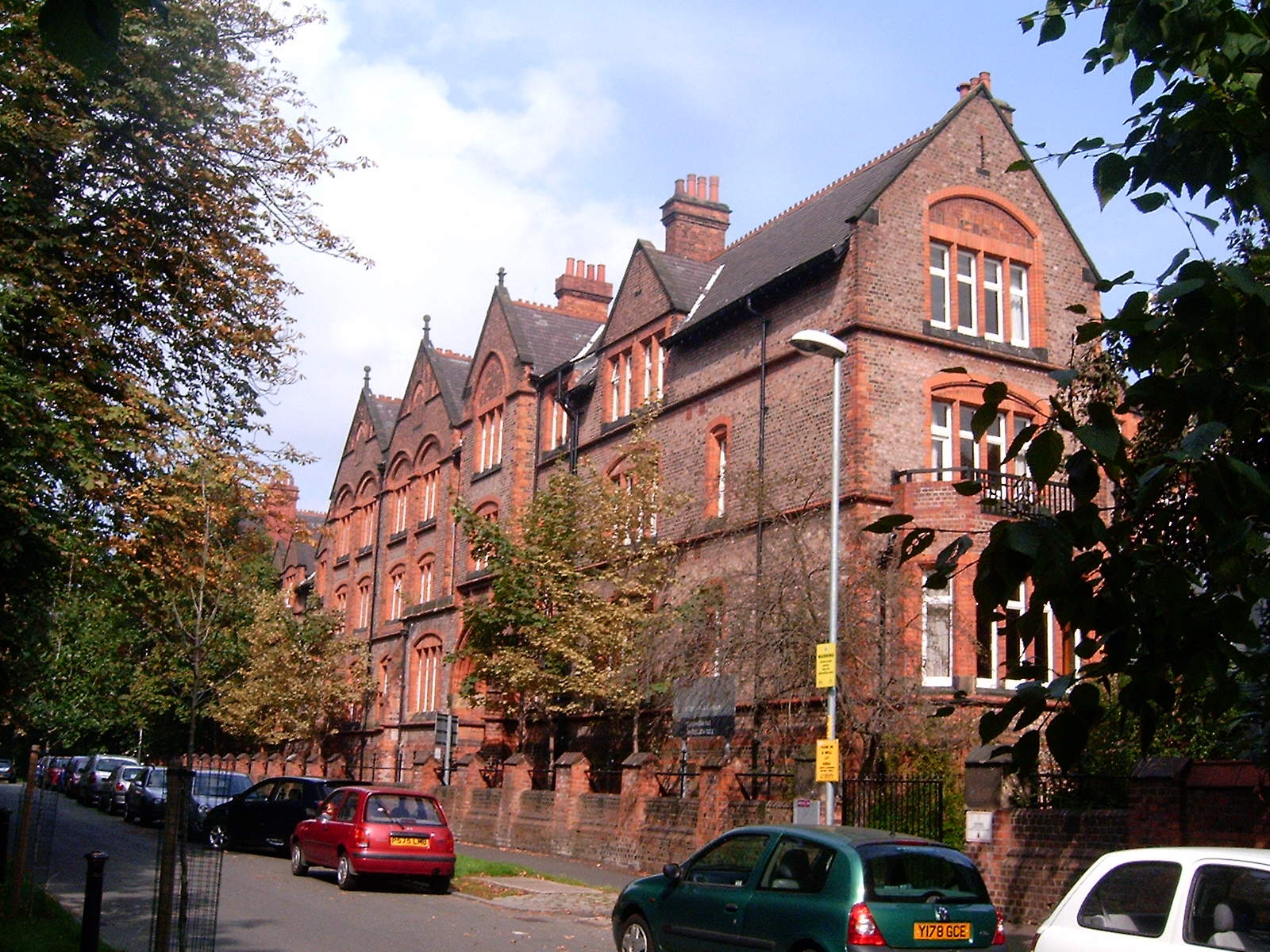
Dalton Hall

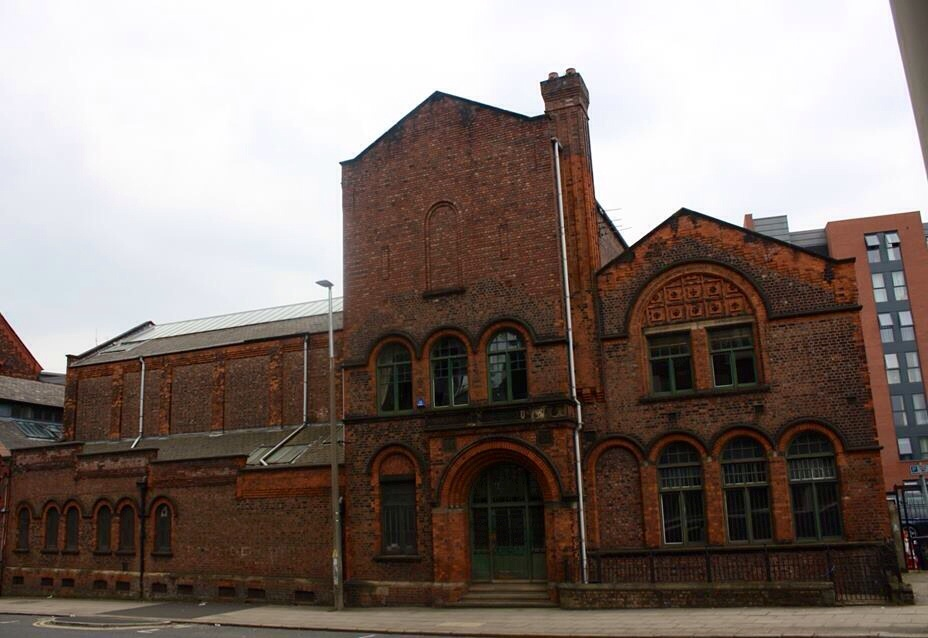
Manchester Tennis and Racquet Club
