= Dalton-Ellis Hall =

Building in Manchester, England

Coordinates: 53°27′25″N 2°13′05″W

- Hall of Residence
- University of Manchester
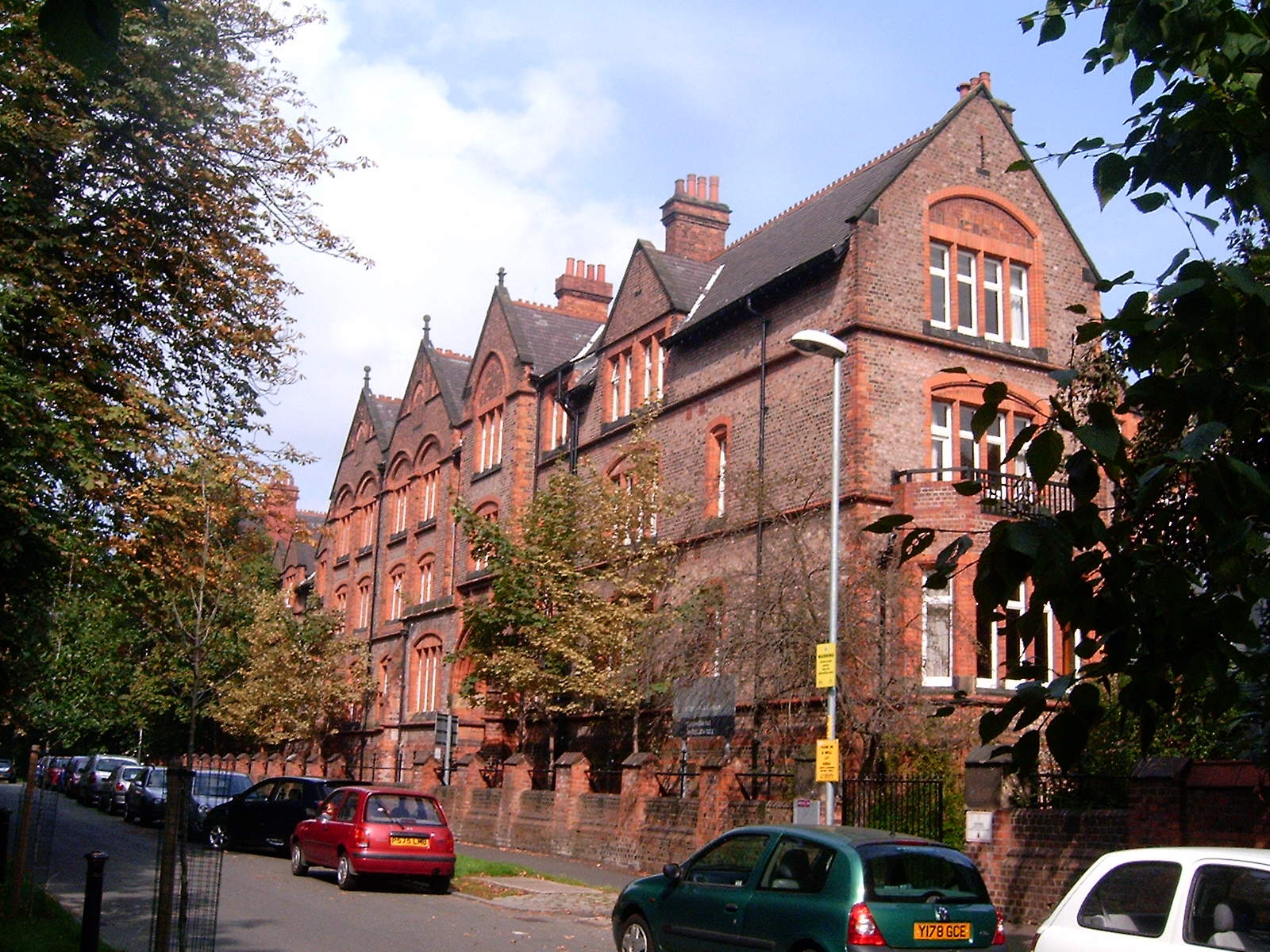
- The "Main Hall" block at Dalton-Ellis
- Location: Manchester, UK
- Established: 1987 as Dalton-Ellis
- Former names: Dalton Hall founded 1876; Ellis Llwyd Jones Hall founded in 1919
- Gender: Co-ed
- Principal: Timothy Stibbs
- Residents: 279
- Blocks: 5 (Main Hall, Sutherland, Fiddes, Ewings and Graham)

Listed Building – Grade II
- Official name: Dalton Hall with attached forecourt walls
- Designated: 2 October 1974
- Reference no.: 1208904

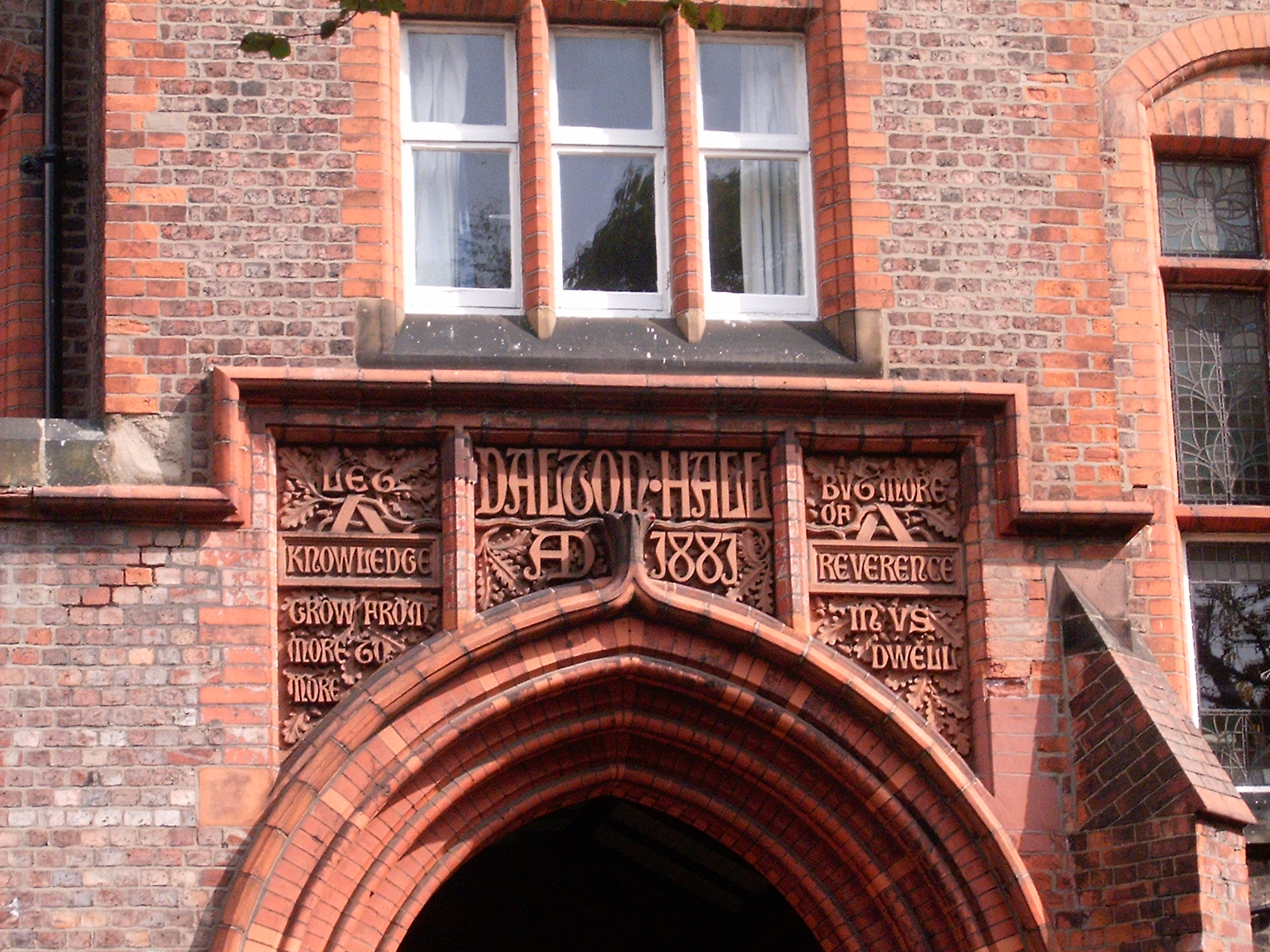
Inscription above the original main entrance to the hall. The inscription reads "Let knowledge grow from more to more but more of reverence in us dwell".

Dalton-Ellis Hall is a hall of residence complex at the University of Manchester in Manchester, England. It is situated in the south of the city on Conyngham Road in Victoria Park, next to St Chrysostom's Church. It is close to Wilmslow Road in Rusholme. Dalton-Ellis has 279 male and female residents in catered accommodation. The hall admits both undergraduate and postgraduate students; most are undergraduate first years.

The complex comprises several residential blocks built at various stages. They include the Grade II listed Main Hall, the first purpose-built hall of residence in England, opened in 1882, the Nield Wing extension to Main Hall, Fiddes, Graham, Ewings, and Sutherland built in 1994. Dalton-Ellis Hall has a second Grade II listed block, Eaglesfield, which is not currently in use.

Sunnyside houses the complex's library and music rooms and other facilities include a squash court, tennis courts, croquet lawn, and a bar. There is a computer cluster and a reading room. The hall also has a history of sporting success fielding rugby, hockey, netball, cricket, football and croquet teams.

== History ==
The Dalton-Ellis Hall complex is a product of the merger of Dalton Hall and Ellis Llwyd Jones Hall in 1987. The history of the separate halls goes back to the 19th century.

=== Dalton Hall ===
Dalton Hall was founded by the Quakers in 1881 as accommodation for students from a Quaker background attending Owens College, the forerunner to the University of Manchester. It was named after John Dalton, a scientist and Quaker in the city. The hall moved to the building currently used as Dalton-Ellis's Main Hall in 1882. The building, like the neighbouring St Chrysostom's Church was designed by George T Redmayne.

In 1892 the large Victorian house now known as Eaglesfield was bought to increase the hall's capacity. In the early years of the 20th century, its capacity was increased with the addition of the Nield Wing extension to Main Hall, which contained more rooms and a Junior Common Room. Dalton Hall became a university hall of residence in 1958. Although the original intention was to admit both men and women, once the university started to admit women, this proposal was dropped and Dalton Hall remained a male only hall until it merged with Ellis Llywd Jones Hall in 1987.

Between February and September of 2023, internal decoration of Graham and Ewings were refurbished.

=== Ellis Llwyd Jones Hall ===
Ellis Llwyd Jones Hall was founded in 1919 as a female only hall. The hall was originally built in Old Trafford, but was moved brick by brick to Victoria Park in 1981. It was named after Ellis Llwyd Jones, son of Sir James Jones who donated the hall to the university in memory of his son.

== Gallery ==
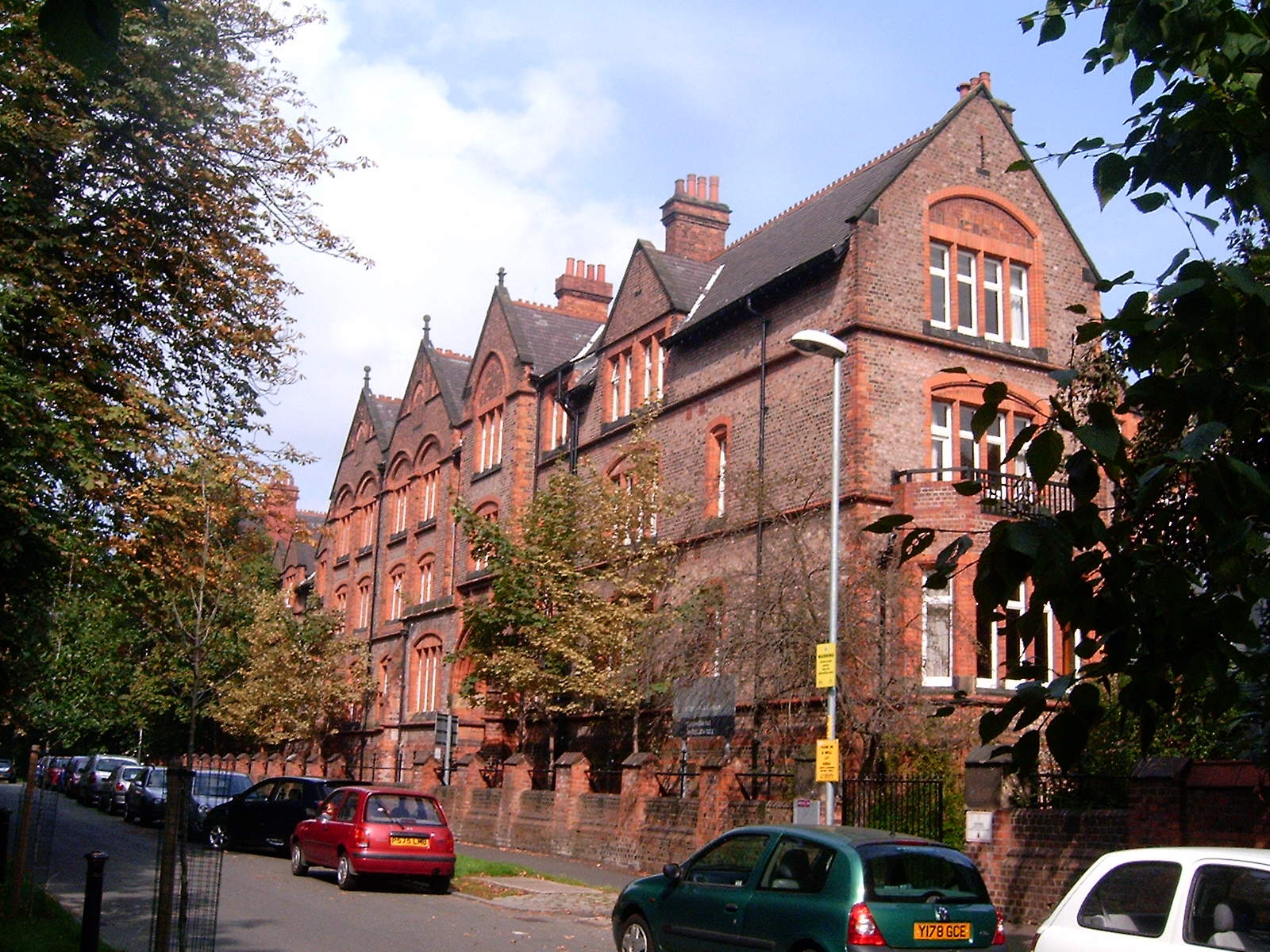
Main Hall

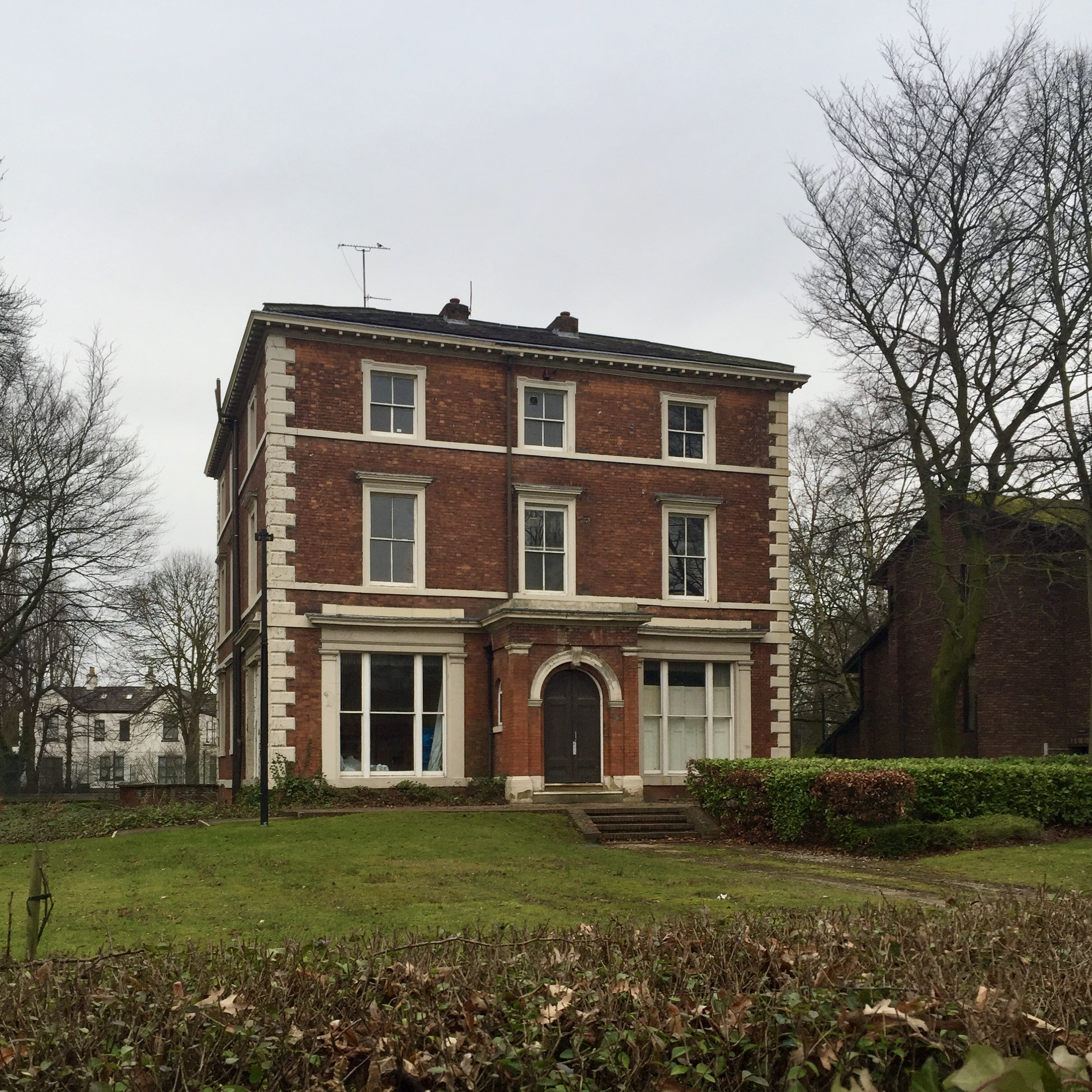
Eaglesfield

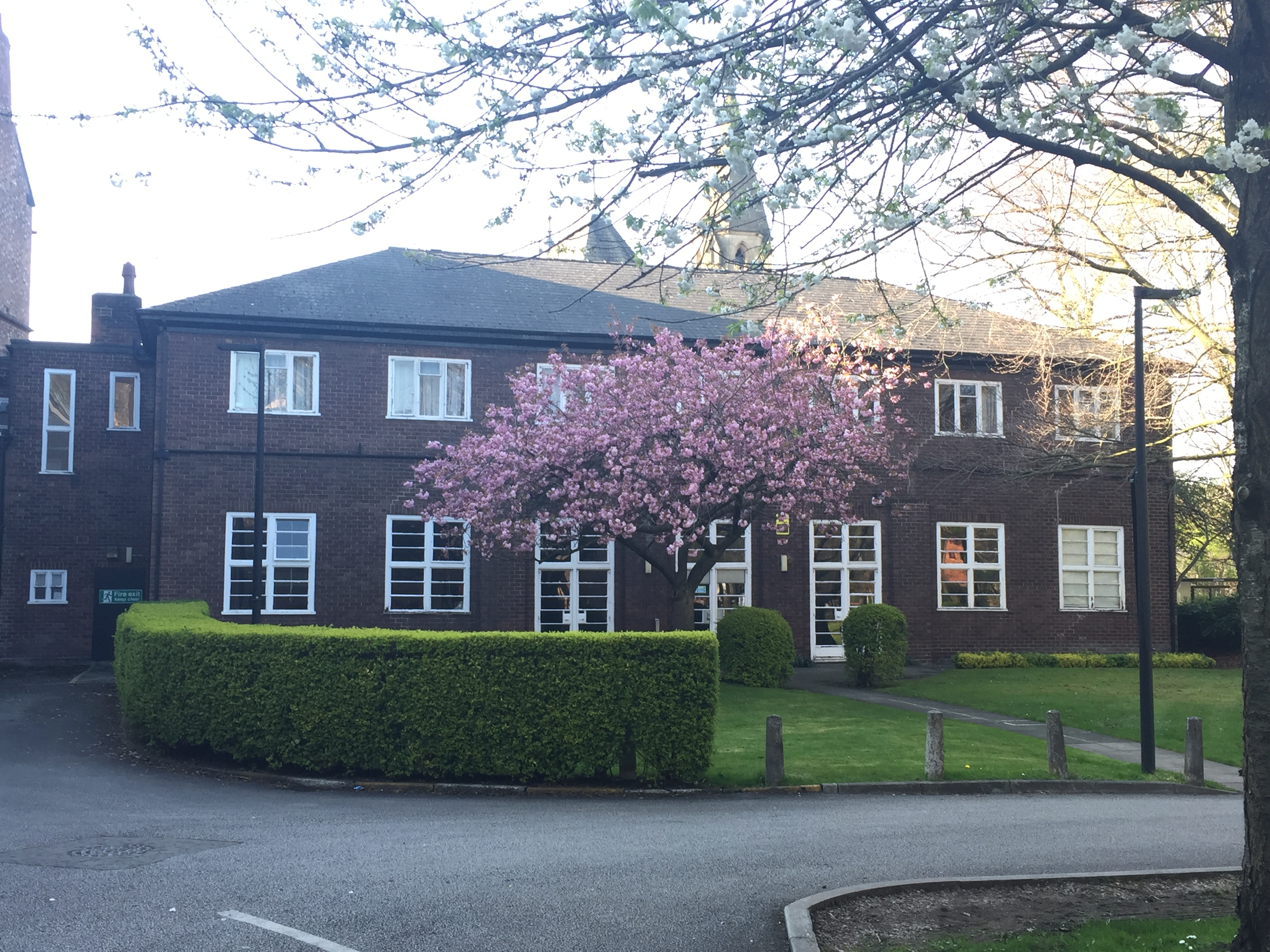
Nield Wing

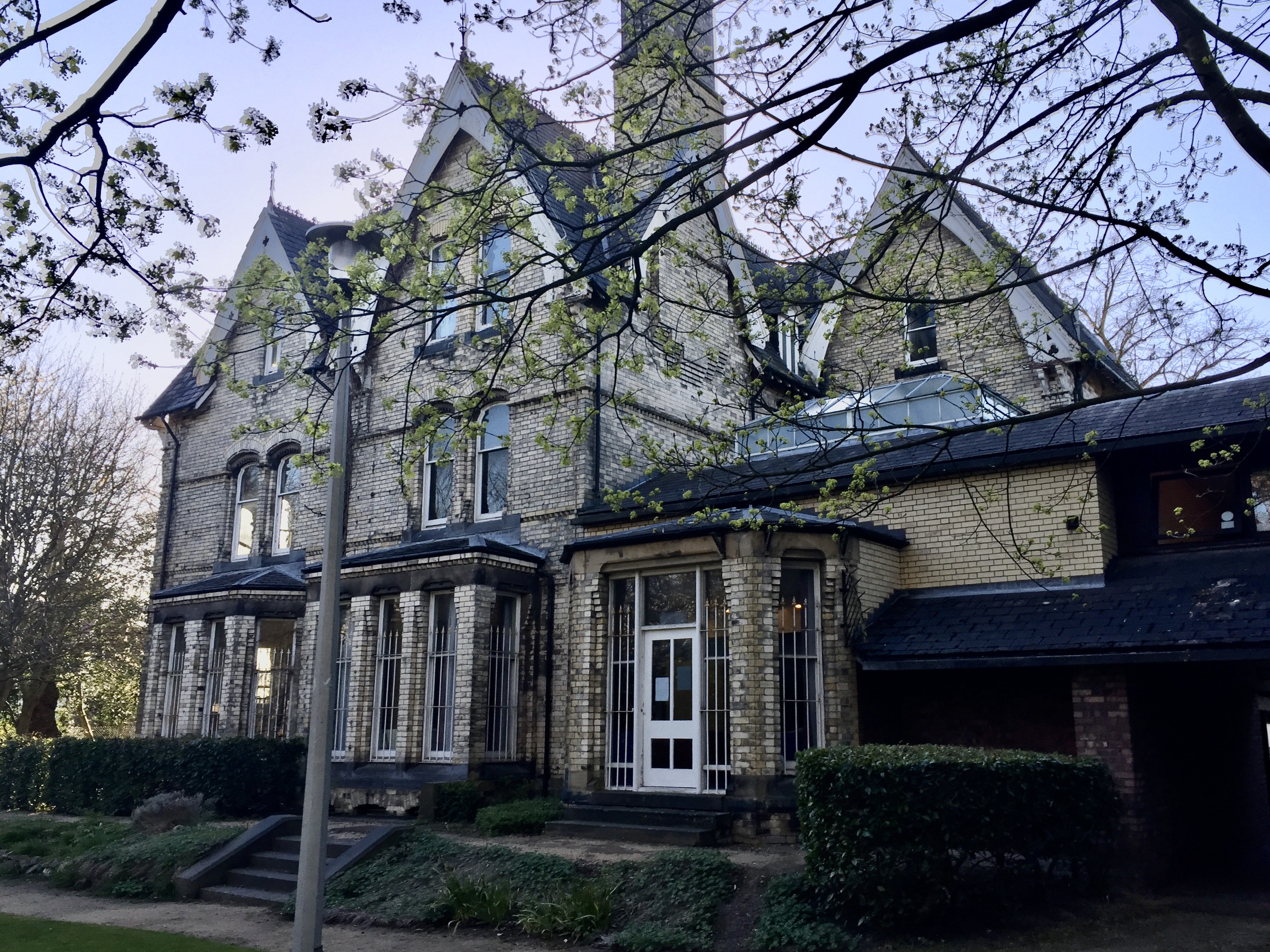
Sunnyside

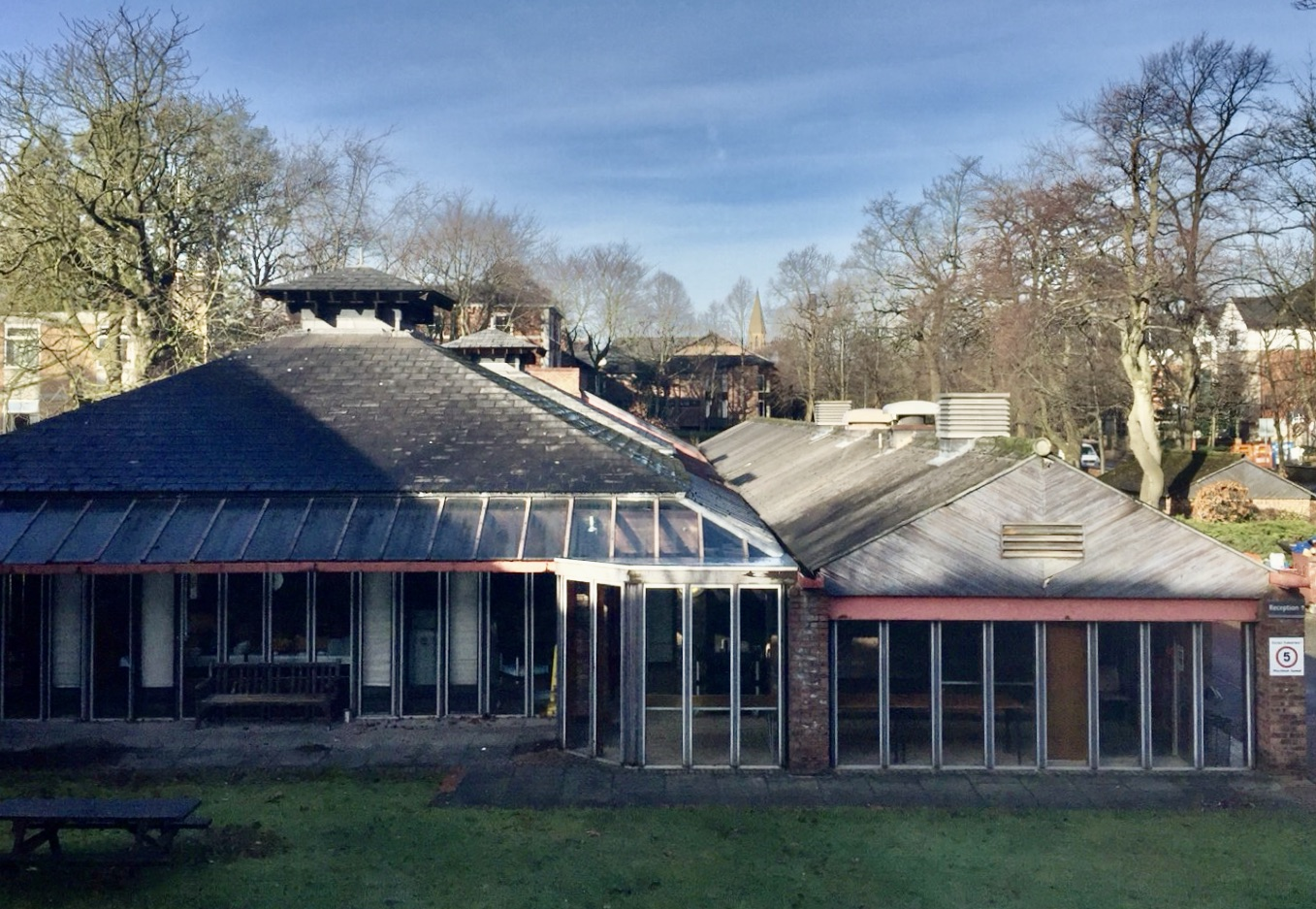
Dining Hall

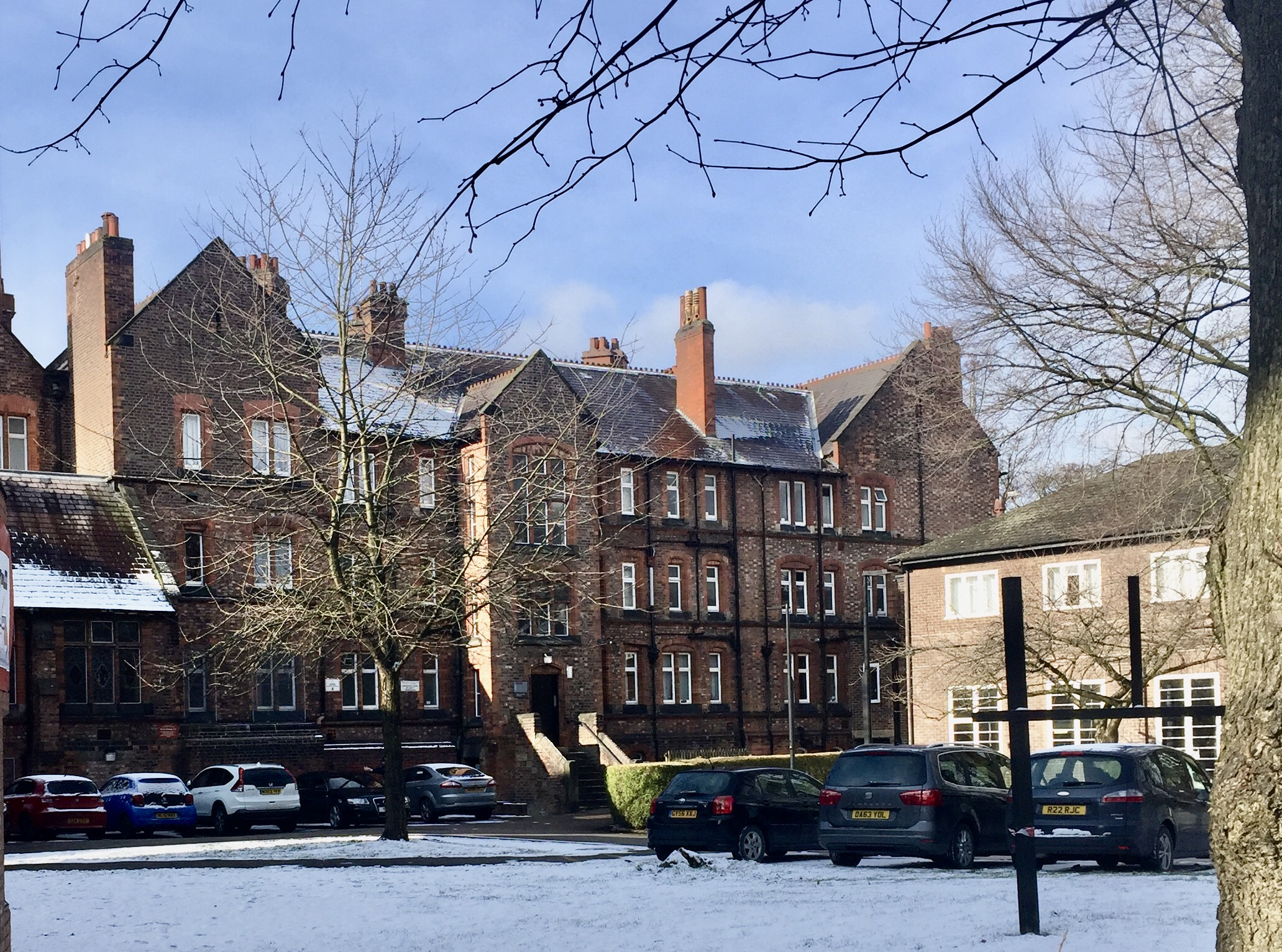
Car park

=== Ewings Block ===
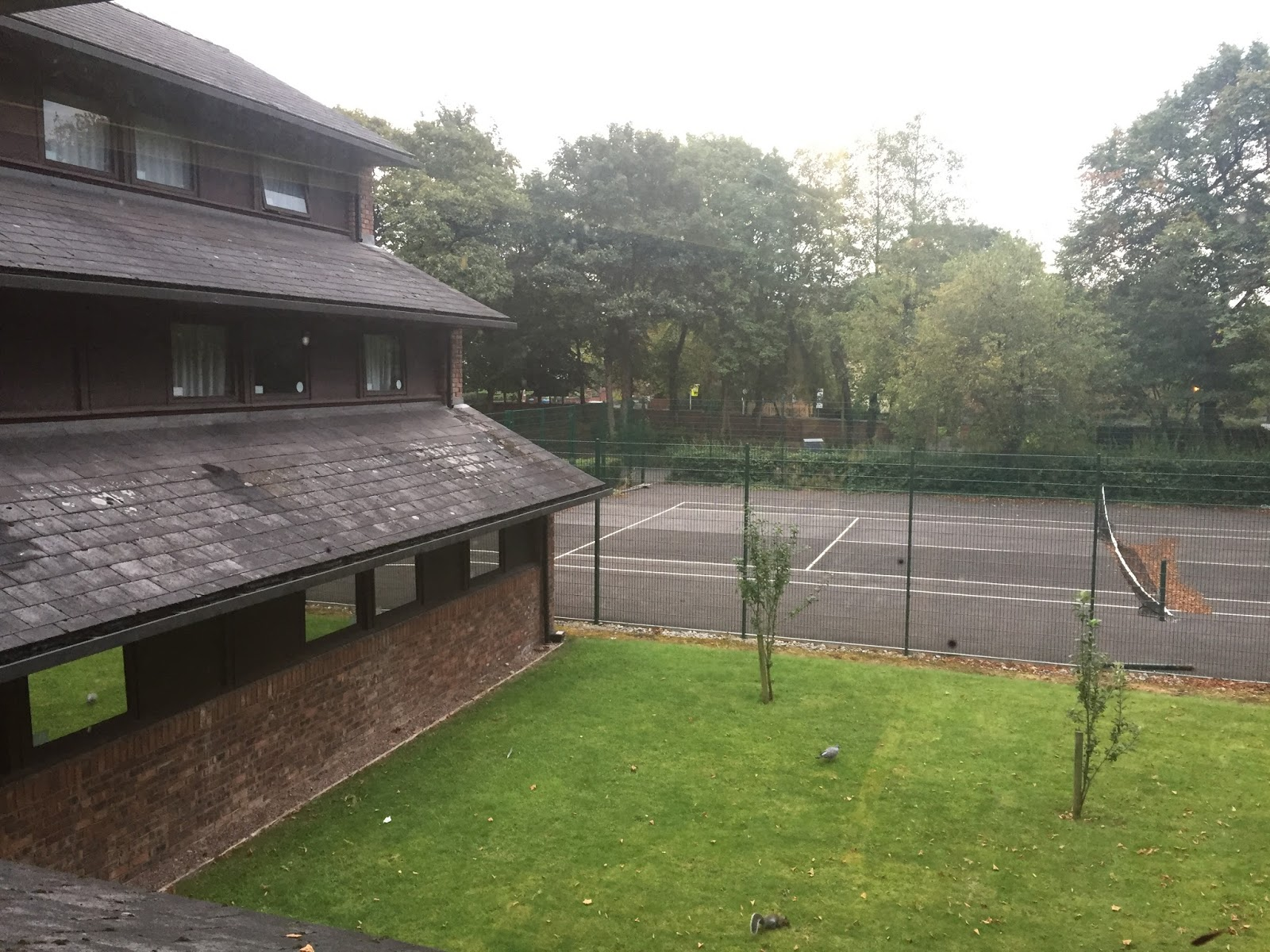
Ewings exterior

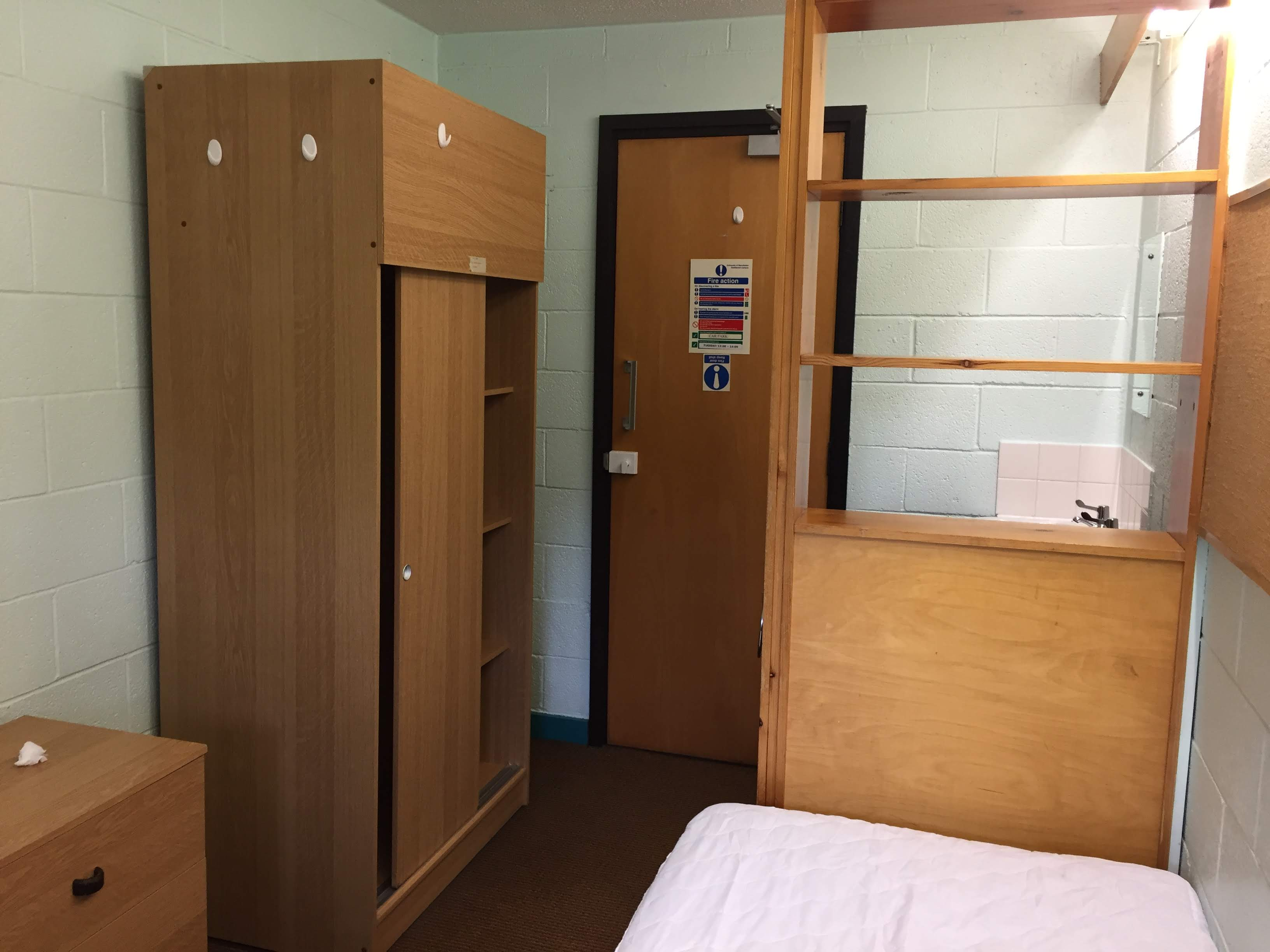
Room interior

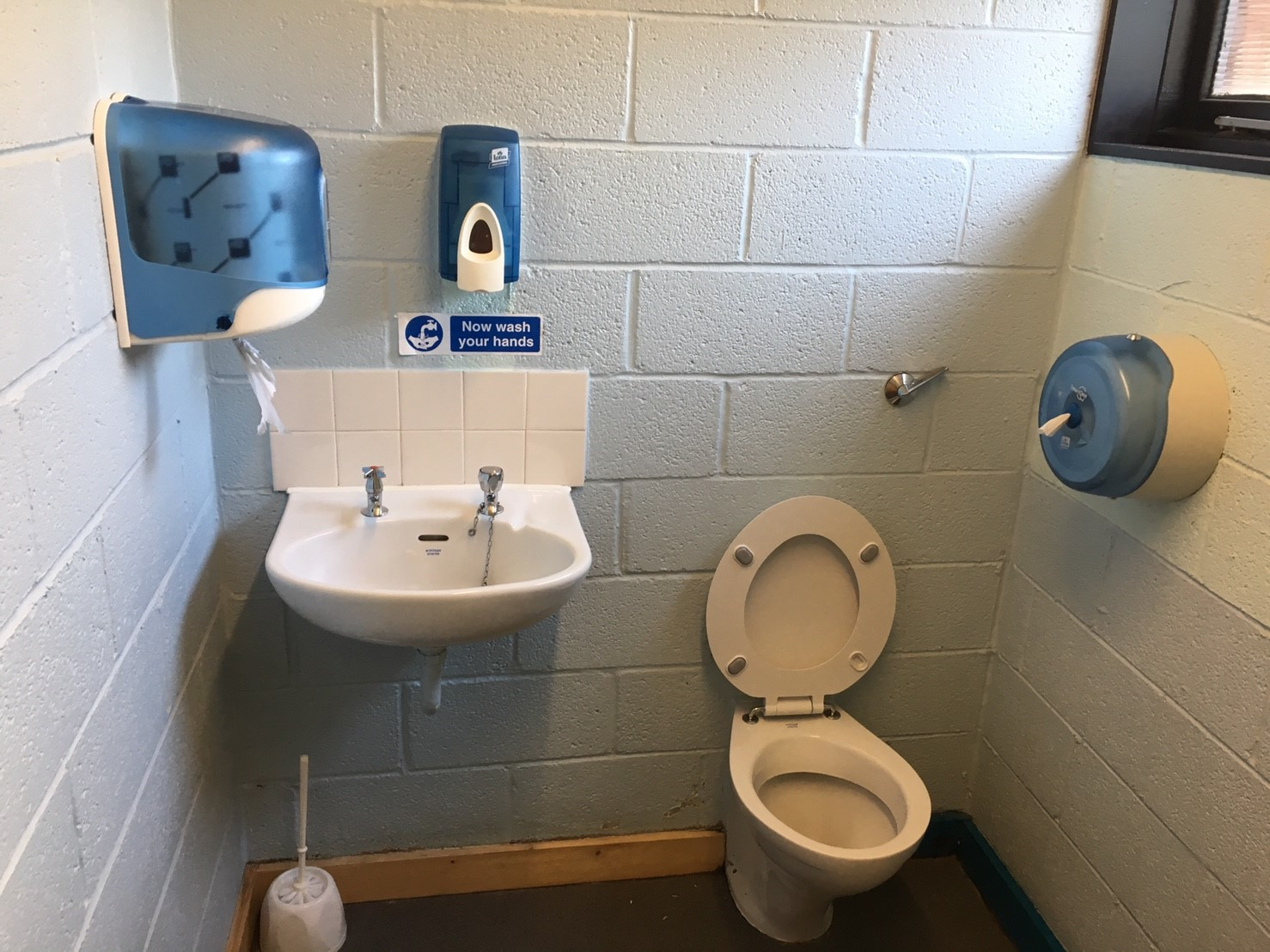
Shared toilet

=== Sutherland Block ===
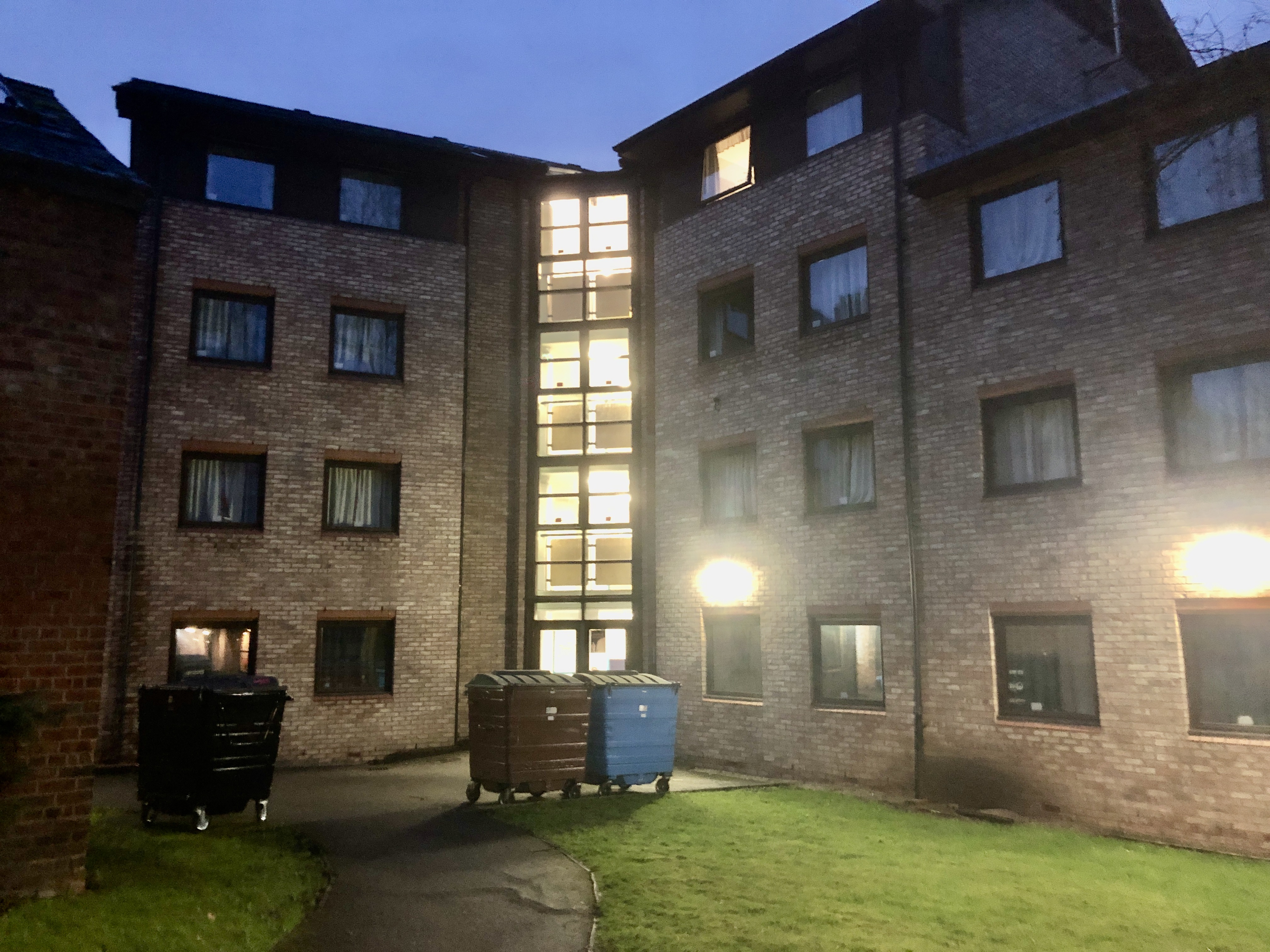
Sutherland exterior

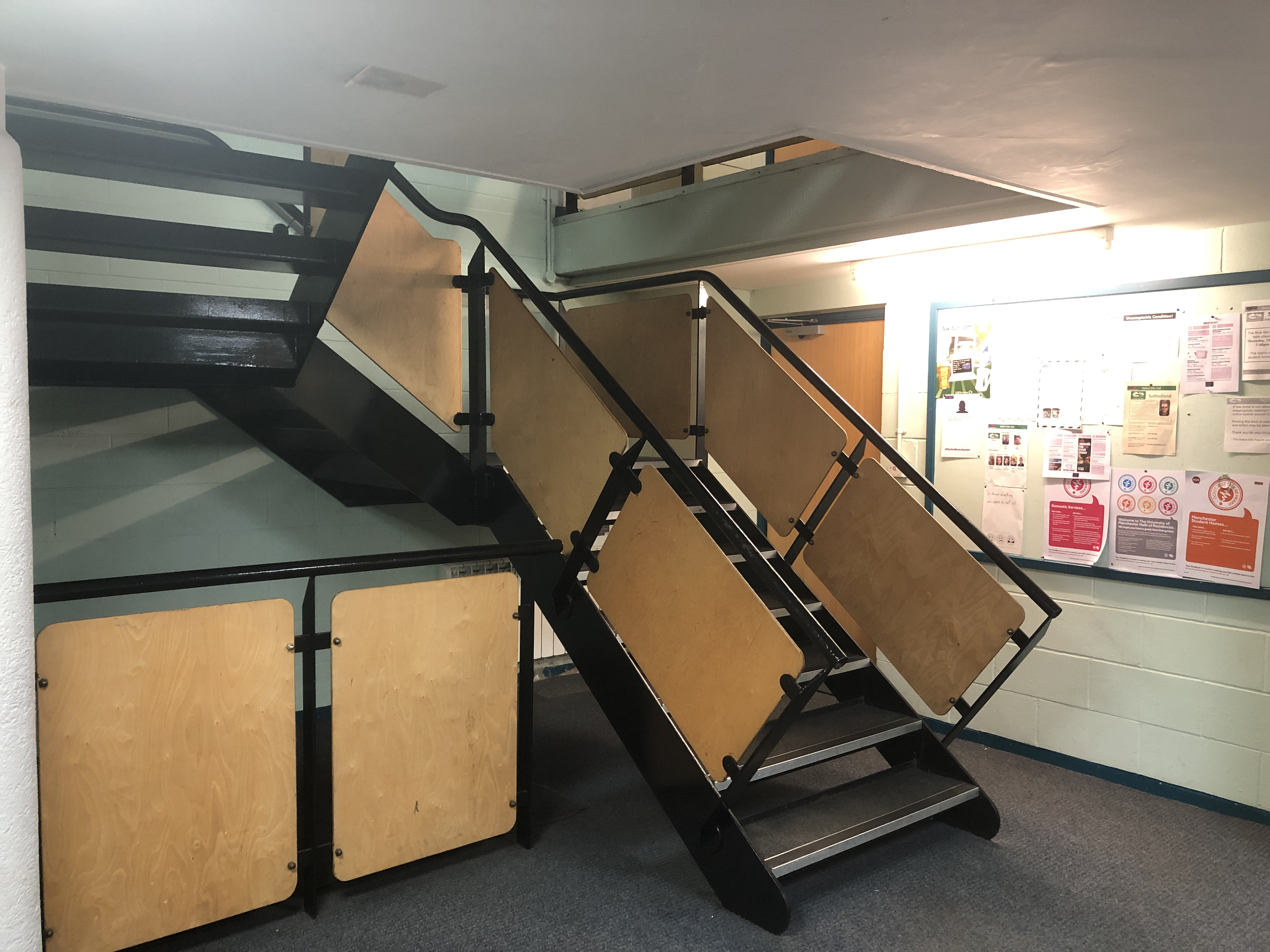
Staircase

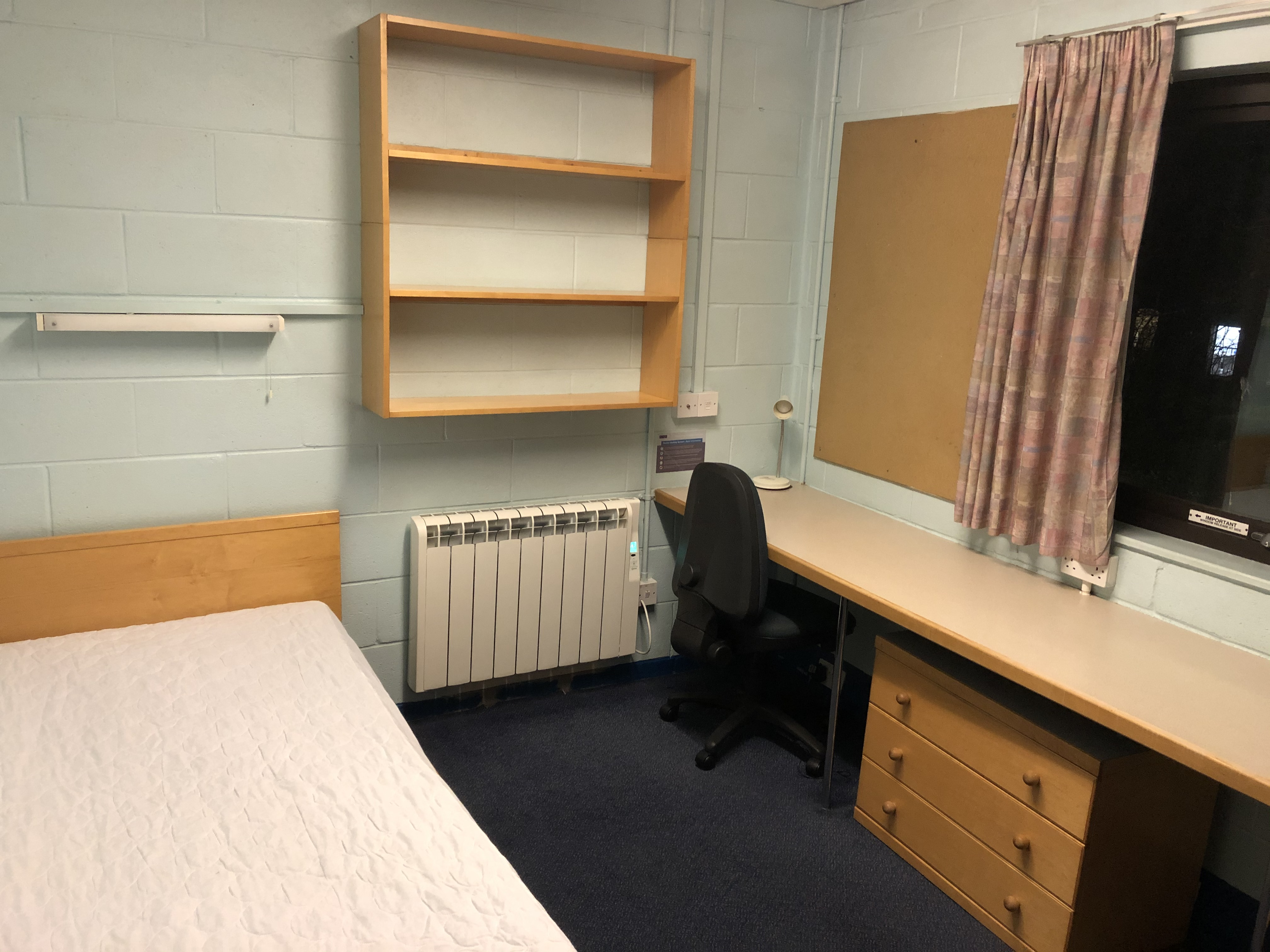
Room interior

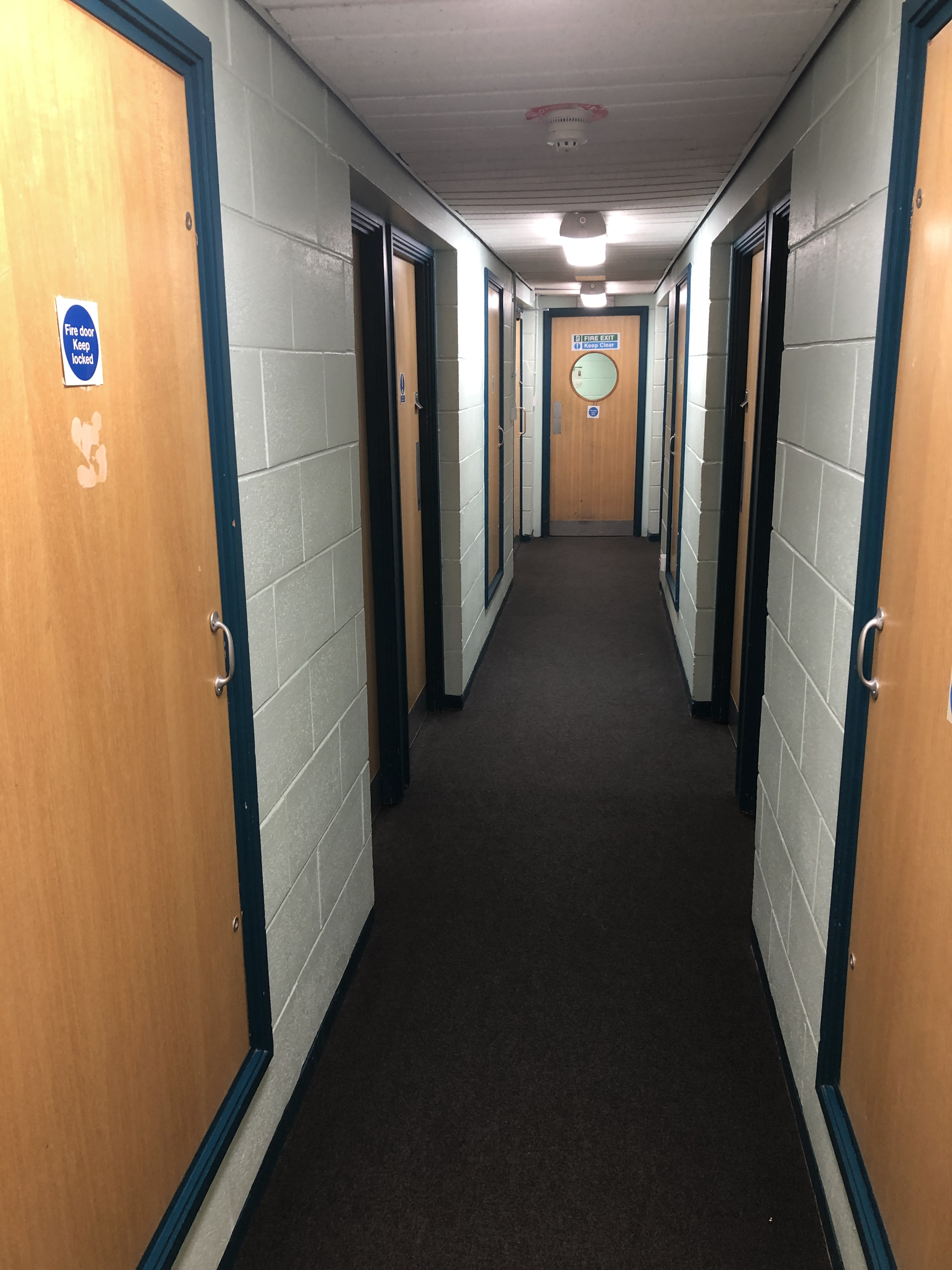
Corridor view

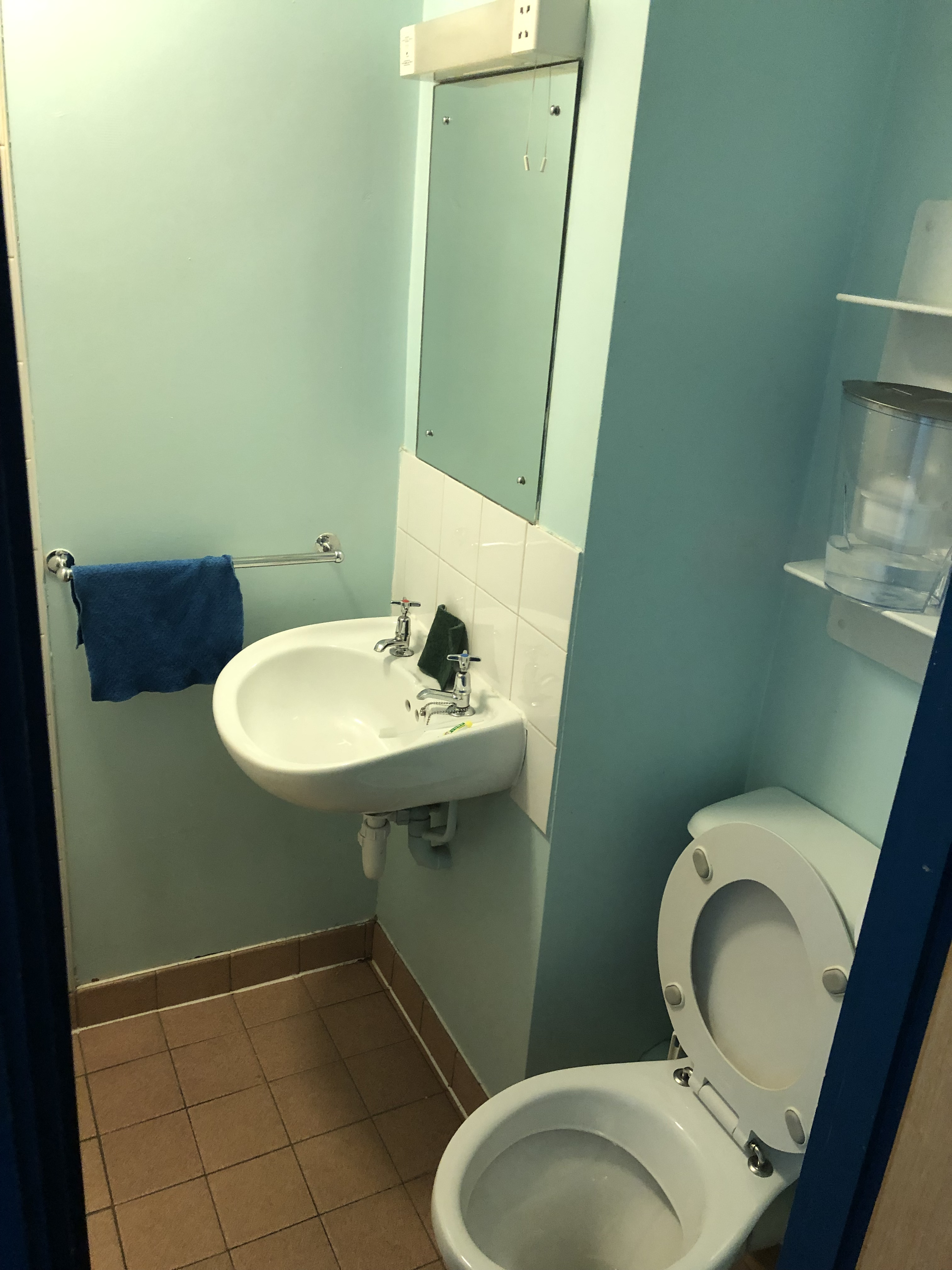
Private bathroom

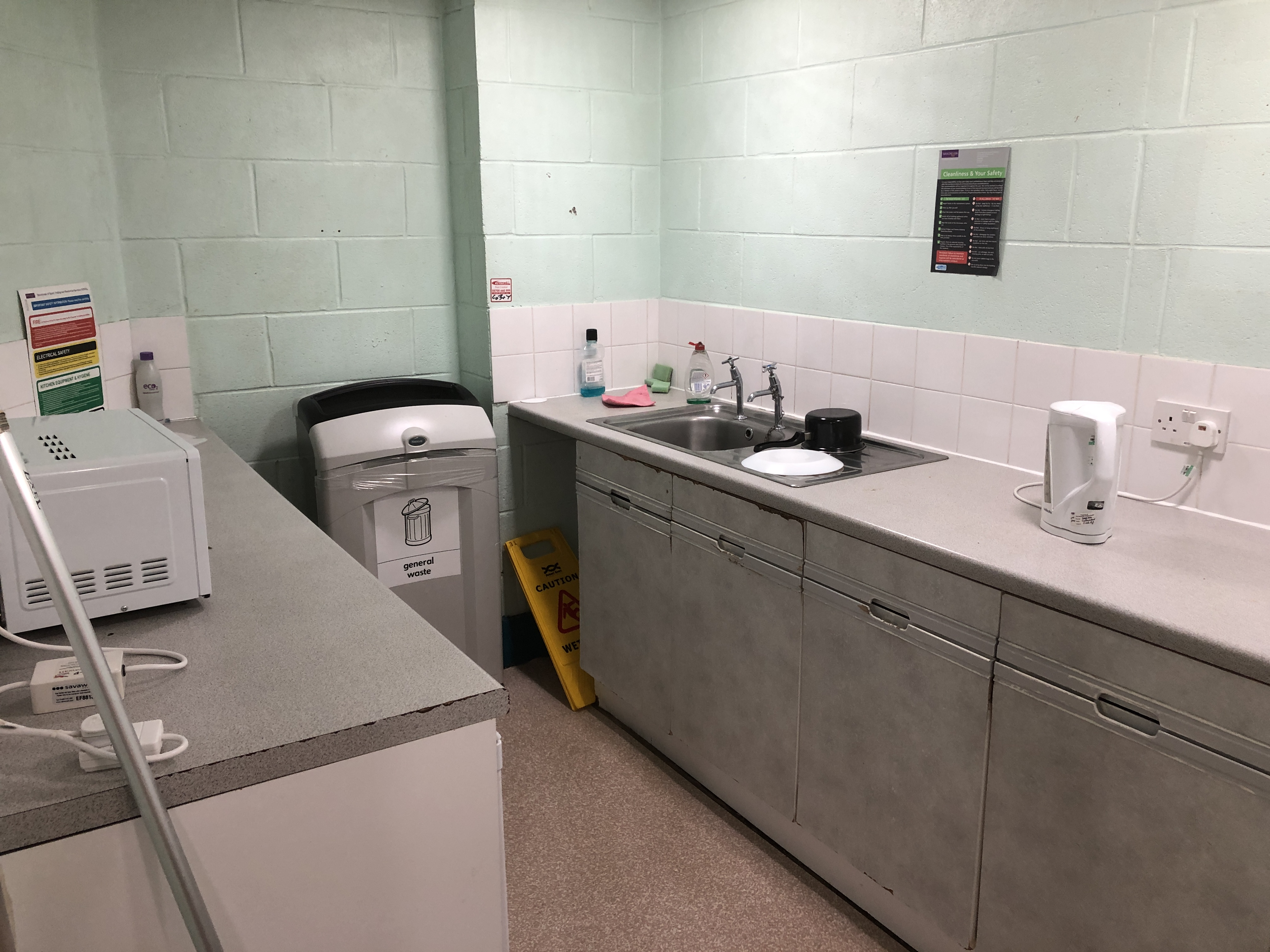
Shared kitchen

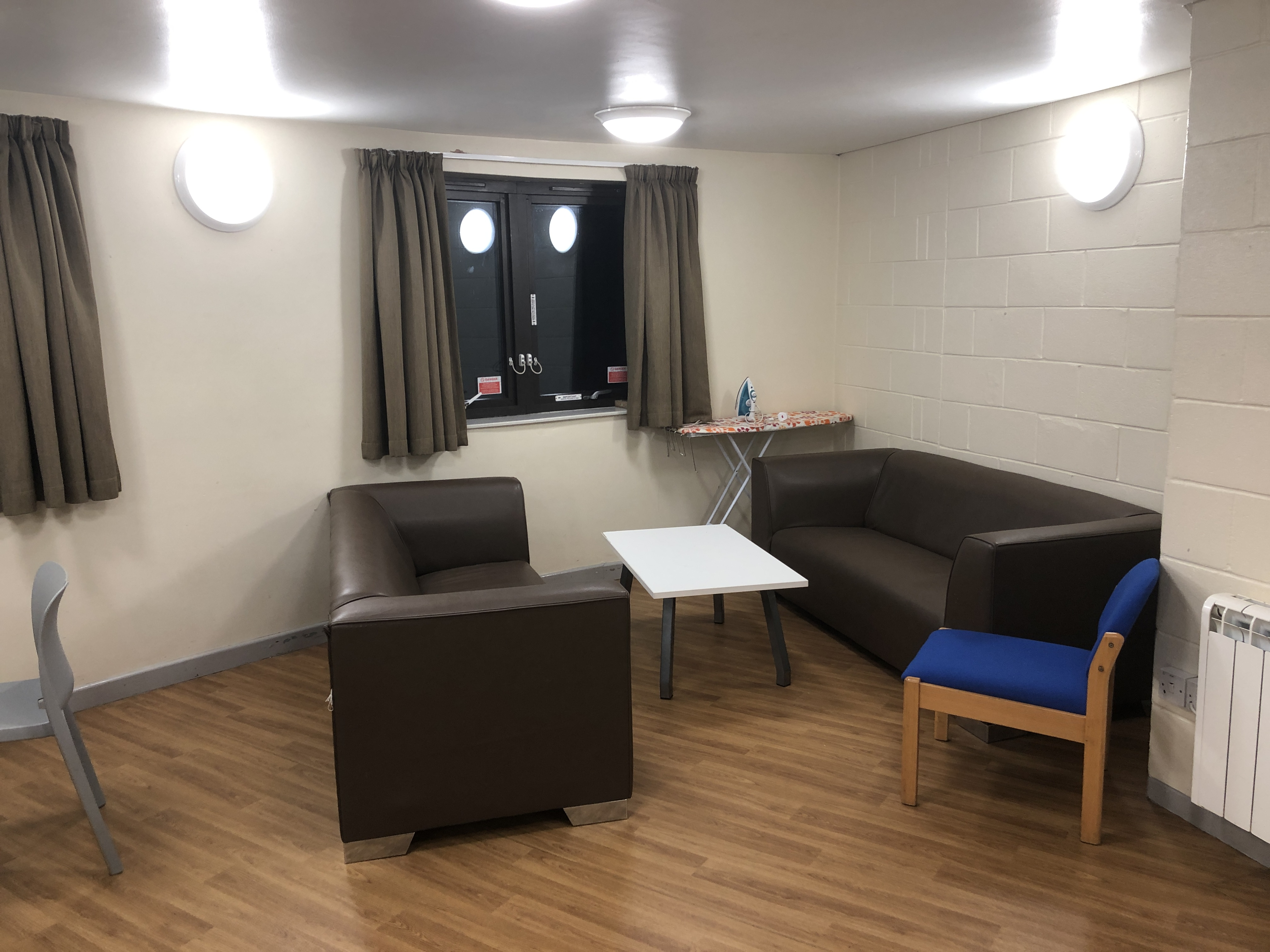
Common room
