= Victoria Park, Manchester =

Suburban area of Manchester, England

Coordinates: 53°27′25″N 2°13′01″W

Victoria Park
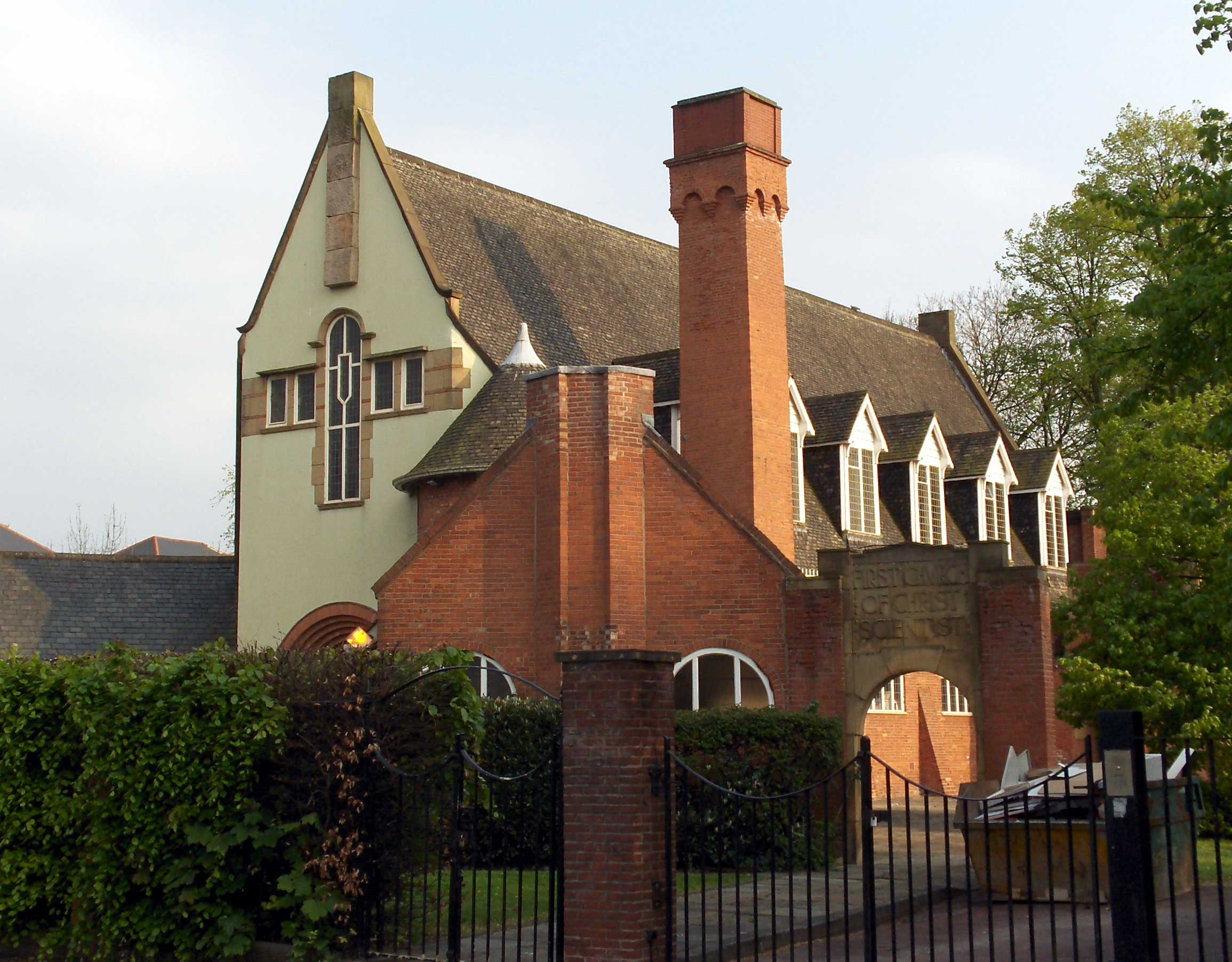
- The Grade I listed Edgar Wood Centre

- Location within Greater Manchester
- OS grid reference: SJ 860 955
- Metropolitan borough: Manchester
- Metropolitan county: Greater Manchester
- Region: North West
- Country: England
- Sovereign state: United Kingdom
- Post town: MANCHESTER
- Postcode district: M13
- Dialling code: 0161
- Police: Greater Manchester
- Fire: Greater Manchester
- Ambulance: North West
- UK Parliament: Manchester Gorton

Victoria Park is a suburban area of Manchester, in the metropolitan county of Greater Manchester, England. It lies approximately 2 miles (3.2 km) south of the city centre, between Rusholme and Longsight. Developed in the early 19th century as a private residential estate, the area retains elements of its original layout and includes several listed buildings. Today it has a mixed residential character and is closely associated with nearby educational and healthcare institutions.

== History and description ==
In 1836 the architectural practice of Richard Lane and Partners undertook to establish a residential area to the east of Wilmslow Road. It was intended to be an estate of substantial houses set in spacious grounds, where prosperous families could live. Lane was already noted for his public work in the Neoclassical style, for example Chorlton-on-Medlock Town Hall.

The early development of the Victoria Park estate proceeded unevenly. Although the Victoria Park Company set out ambitious plans in the late 1830s, progress was hindered by internal difficulties, including the fraud that later gave rise to the landmark case Foss v Harbottle. A short cul‑de‑sac of villas was constructed on the northern edge of the estate, opposite what is now Whitworth Park, but these houses were subsequently demolished during the expansion of the Royal Infirmary. Engineering limitations also constrained development: contemporary drainage techniques proved inadequate for parts of the site, and substantial areas remained undeveloped until later in the nineteenth century. A number of the earliest villas survive, particularly on the south side of Moss Lane East between Wilmslow Road and Monton Street, where several are now listed buildings.

The second phase of development focused on the more favourable land that became the core of Victoria Park, where substantial villas were built for professional residents, and, from an early date, a notably diverse community that included wealthy Prussian and Chinese merchants. The estate operated as a private, gated enclave with tollgates, boundary walls and its own police force. By 1850 around fifty villas designed by various architects had been completed. The character of the area began to change in the early 20th century, and following a prolonged period of social decline beginning in the 1920s, Victoria Park later stabilised and today comprises a mixture of university residences alongside rented and private accommodation. In March 1972, Manchester City Council designated a conservation area in Victoria Park.

=== Individual buildings ===
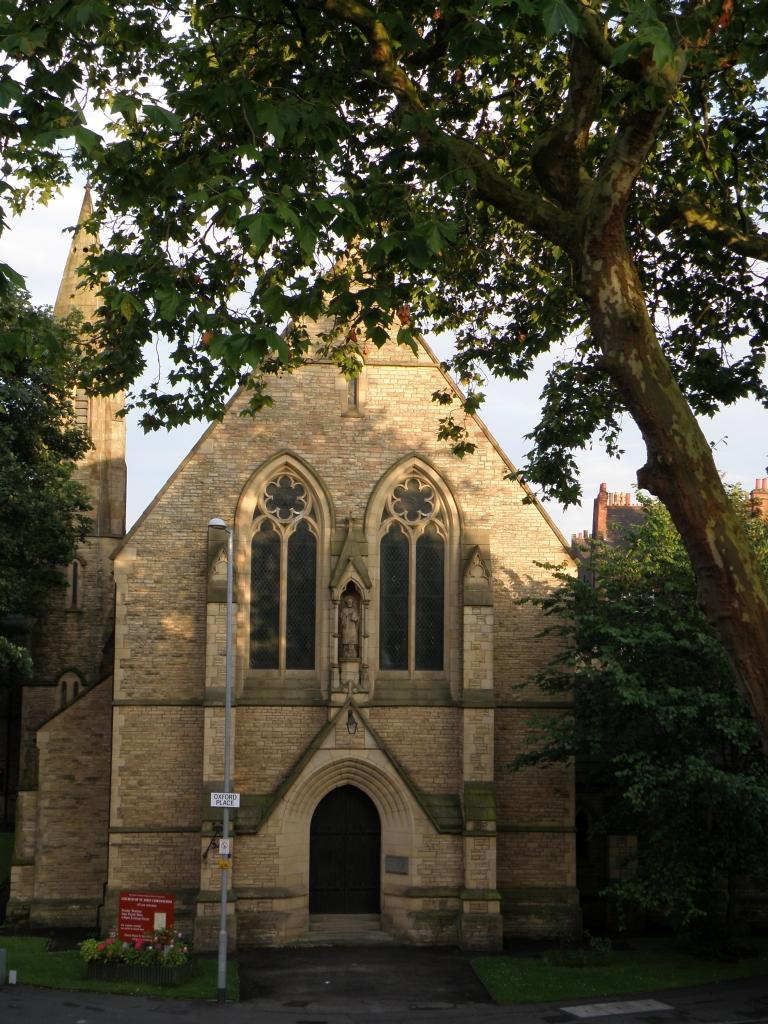
St Chrysostom's Church (Church of England)

The area contains several listed buildings. Notable examples include:

- The Grade I listed former First Church of Christ, Scientist (now the Edgar Wood Centre) on Daisy Bank Road, designed by Edgar Wood in 1903.
- 84 Plymouth Grove, a Grade II* listed house and the residence of William and Elizabeth Gaskell from 1850 until their deaths in 1884 and 1865 respectively.
- St Chrysostom's Church, a Grade II listed building by George Tunstal Redmayne, situated at the corner of Oxford Place and Anson Road.
- Dalton-Ellis Hall, a Grade II listed hall of residence of the University of Manchester, also designed by Redmayne and backing onto St Chrysostom's Church.
- Denison House, a Grade II listed building that now accommodates the Chinese Consulate-General.

The Consulate of Pakistan is also located in Victoria Park.

The Victoria Park campus of the University of Manchester includes several halls of residence, among them Hulme Hall (including Burkhardt House), St Anselm Hall with Canterbury Court, Dalton-Ellis Hall, the former St Gabriel's Hall and Opal Gardens Hall. Hulme Hall contains Grade II listed buildings designed by Percy Worthington in the arts and crafts style, and is the university's oldest hall of residence, having opened in 1887 and moved to Victoria Park in 1907.

=== Church history ===
A church was included in the line drawings issued by Lane in 1836. The building was started in the 1840s but was abandoned because the Victoria Park Company went bankrupt. Victoria Park was from 1850 included in the parish of St James, Birch, until 1878, when the new parish of St John Chrysostom was created from parts of the parish of St James and other parishes.

== Notable people ==
- Ford Madox Brown (1821–1893), artist, resident of the area
- Richard Cobden (1804–1865), political activist, resident of the area
- Elizabeth Gaskell (1810–1865), novelist, resident of the area
- Winston Graham (1908–2003), novelist, resident of the area
- George Hadfield (1787–1879), politician, resident of the area
- Charles Hallé (1819–1895), musician, resident of the area
- Gerald Kaufman (1930–2017), politician, resident of the area
- Emmeline Pankhurst (1858–1928), suffragette, resident of the area
- Richard Pankhurst (1834–1898), politician, resident of the area
- Genesis P-Orridge (1950–2020), performance artist and occultist, resident of the area
- Edward Salomons (1828–1906), architect, resident of the area
- Sir Arthur Schuster (1851–1934), physicist, resident of the area

== See also ==
- Victoria Baths, an Edwardian public bath complex immediately north of Victoria Park
- Greygarth Hall, a long‑established student residence situated within the Victoria Park area
