= Zubair Hoque =

English racing driver (born 1996)

- Nationality: English
- Born: 18 July 1996 (age 30) Hale, Cheshire, England
- Relatives: Mashukul Hoque (father)
- Current team: Sean Walkinshaw Racing
- Former teams: TMR Development Race Team (2008–2011); Ricky Flynn Motorsport (2012–2014)

Zubair Hoque (Bengali: জুবায়ের হক; born 18 July 1996) is an English racing driver.

== Career ==
=== 2008–2011 (TMR Development Race Team) ===
Supported and encouraged by his father Mashukul, Hoque first developed an interest for motor racing at the age of five He began his racing career at the age of eight at the Daytona Manchester karting track, where he was spotted by Daytona management during arrive and drive sessions. He was fast-tracked to junior race schools and progressed from novice to intermediate and then advanced levels, despite racing against, and beating many older and more experienced drivers.

Hoque competed in karting from 2007 until 2012. In his first 'rookie' outing at the Inkart championships, he came second overall. From 2005 to 2008, he competed in indoor racing tracks throughout the North West region. In 2006 and 2007, he came third and second in the Manchester and North West indoor cadet-class karting championship and overall he managed 18 podium finishes while racing indoors.

Between 2008 and 2011, Hoque was trained by Chris Norris at his Ormskirk-based TMR team. In 2008, Hoque obtained his National A outdoor karting license.

In 2008, after performances in the Rotax Mini-Max class championship, organisers of the Formula Kart Stars and Super 1 Championships invited him to take part in their 2009 seasons. In 2009, he finished his first season in the Formula Kart Stars championship in fourth place, making him the highest ranked rookie. In the same year, he finished eighth overall in the Super 1 British Championship, again being the highest ranked rookie in the competition. He also broke the lap record at Oxford's Shenington race track, which he held for over a year.

In 2010, Moque competed in 13 races all over UK and Europe. In the same year, he broke the lap record at Rowrah's circuit. In October 2010, he finished second in the Formula Kart Stars Mini Max title.

In February 2011, based on his performance in his rookie season, Moque was one of three drivers from the UK invited to attend the BMW Motorsport facility in Valencia, Spain to receive coaching from BMW Formula Motorsport division's top instructors as part of Formula BMW Talent Cup evaluations in Valencia, Spain. This was the first time Hoque tested a single-seater. In the same month, he participated in the Official Test Course for the Formula BMW Talent Cup as a reward for their achievements in the 2010 Formula Kart Stars season.

=== 2012–2014 (Ricky Flynn Motorsport) ===
Ricky Flynn took an interest in his 2009/2010 season lap records and finishing positions. In July 2011, Hoque entered into talks with Ricky Flynn after attending the WSK Euro Series at the Zuera circuit in Zaragoza, Spain. In early October 2011, following his signing to the Ricky Flynn Motorsport (RFM) team, he began training under RFM's guidance, with a visit to the PFi circuit in Lincolnshire. He travelled with the RFM team to compete in the International Winter Cup at Garda, Italy in February 2012. In 2012, he made the transition between the Super 1 British Championship and next race category KF2 (a kart racing class for top drivers over the age of 15). As well as receiving coaching, Hoque competed with some of the best drivers in the world, aged 14 to 18, for the chance to drive as one of BMW's drivers in the Formula BMW Talent Cup, in special junior-spec cars derived from Formula Three racing. In 2012, he finished fifth in the MSA British Championship Positions with a hat-trick of podium results.

In 2011, Hoque helped his school Altrincham Grammar School for Boys win the fifth annual British Schools Karting Championship at Daytona Milton Keynes beating 450 teams from 176 schools competing nationally. In 2012, they finished second and missed out on becoming BSKC champions by a tenth of a second. In 2013, Over 1600 boys and girls from schools across the country competed, Altrincham Grammar School won the North West regional final but lost to Emrys School in the national final.

In 2014, it was confirmed Hoque would competing in the Formula Four/Formula Renault category. In October of that year, he moved to Formula 4 after 10 years in kart racing.

In November of that year, Roque made his single-seater racing debut at the 2014 BRDC Winter Series Championship with the HHC Motorsport squad. He won the 'top rookie' title after achieving two top-five finishes at Snetterton 300 Circuit and Brands Hatch Indy Circuit during the eight-race Winter Series.

=== 2015–present (Sean Walkinshaw Racing) ===
In January 2015, Hoque joined the Chipping Norton-based Sean Walkinshaw Racing (SWR) team for his first full season in the BRDC Formula 4 Championship. In May of that year, Hoque finished third position to score his first podium success in the Duo BRDC Formula 4 Championship at Rockingham Motor Speedway.

== Awards, nominations and recognition ==
In 2009, Hoque was nominated for Asian Image Achievement in Sport Award at the Fusion Awards. In January 2014 and 2015, he was named in the British Bangladeshi Power & Inspiration 100.

== Personal life ==
Hoque lives in Trafford, Hale, Trafford, Cheshire. From 2007 to 2014, Hoque attended Altrincham Grammar School for Boys. In 2013, he took 18 months on the racing sidelines to focus on his A Levels.

== See also ==
- British Bangladeshi
- List of British Bangladeshis
