= Halecroft =

Listed building in Greater Manchester, England

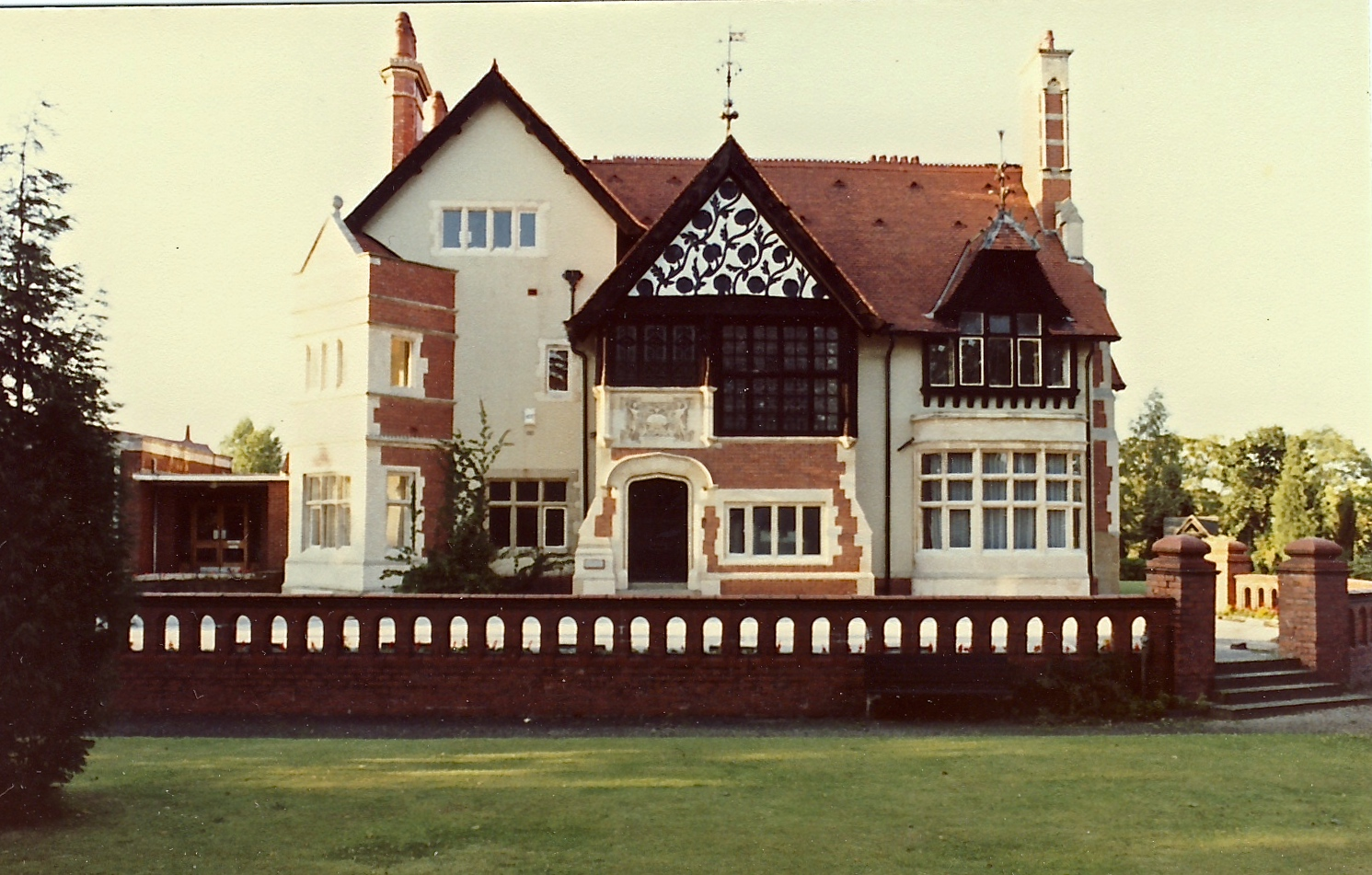
- Halecroft in 1976

- Location within Greater Manchester

General information
- Location: Hale, Greater Manchester, England
- Coordinates: 53.373451°N 2.319812°W
- Completed: 1890

Design and construction
- Architect: Edgar Wood
- Designations

Listed Building – Grade II*
- Official name: Halecroft
- Designated: 12 October 1975
- Reference no.: 1356501

Halecroft is a Grade II* listed building in Hale, a village in the Metropolitan Borough of Trafford in Greater Manchester, England. The building was designed by the architect Edgar Wood as part of a speculative development commissioned by J. Richardson, and was built in 1890; it is an example of Wood's work influenced by the Arts and Crafts Movement. It is one of eleven Grade II* listed buildings in Trafford.

Halecroft is a two-storey building with a single-storey extension added in the 20th century. It uses timber framing, carved wood, pargeting and tile hanging. One of the craftsmen involved was James Lenegan. The windows have mullions and transoms; Clare Hartwell and coauthors write that there are "some interesting touches" to the window design, particularly noting a dormer window featuring a "tiered cap".

As of February 2025, Halecroft is the head office of Britannia Hotels.

== See also ==
- Grade II* listed buildings in Greater Manchester
- Listed buildings in Hale, Greater Manchester
