= Syed Nahas Pasha =

Bangladeshi-born British journalist (born 1957)

- সৈয়দ নাহাস পাশা
- Born: 29 March 1957 (age 69); Sylhet District, East Pakistan (now Bangladesh)
- Citizenship: British
- Occupation: Journalist
- Spouse: Syeda Murshida Pasha
- Children: 3
- Relatives: Syed Jaglul Pasha (brother); Syed Belal Ahmed (brother)

Syed Nahas Pasha (Bengali: সৈয়দ নায়াস পাশা; born 29 March 1957) is a Bangladeshi-born British journalist, and editor-in-chief of Janomot and Curry Life.

== Early life ==
Pasha was born into a Bengali Muslim family of Syeds in Sylhet District, East Pakistan (now Bangladesh). He is the second son of three sons and a daughter. One of his brothers, Syed Jaglul Pasha, is a high ranking civil servant in Bangladesh, and his younger brother, Syed Belal Ahmed, is a journalist and publisher.

From an early age Pasha, was attracted to journalism. At school he was one of the top performers in the Bengali language and literature. In 1976, he came to Britain to join his father. He joined Sonali Bank, after several years in there, he moved to start his own catering business.

== Career ==
Pasha edited school magazines and during the 1980s he edited literary magazine Eeshan.

He is a regular contributor to Bangladeshi daily newspapers. He was employed full-time with the newspaper Notun Din for 10 years and assisted in the establishment of English Language newspaper Asian Post. He later joined Potrika. Then his personal friends Nobab Uddin and Amirul Choudhury invited him to join them as partner and editor-in-chief at weekly Bangla newspaper Janomot.

In 2003, Pasha and his brother, Syed Belal Ahmed, published the first edition of restaurant magazine Curry Life where he is also editor-in-chief. He is the UK correspondent for Bdnews24.com.

In 1993, along with his journalist friends he helped to fund the London Bangla Press Club, which acts as a voice for British Bangladeshi journalists. He is one of the founding members and former General Secretary of London Bangla Press Club. He is a member of the National Union of Journalists (NUJ), sits on the executive committee of the Commonwealth Journalists Association (CJA-UK). and is on the judging panel for the British Bangladeshi Power & Inspiration 100.

Pasha has worked on numerous policies and issues with Home Office and the Foreign and Commonwealth Office, and has travelled with Government ministers and officials to France, Germany and Bangladesh. In 2007, he was invited to accompany the Home Office and Foreign Office Ministers on a trip to France for discussions between Britain and France on cooperation on immigration. In 2012, he was elected as EC member for the Commonwealth Journalists Association at their conference in Malta.

Pasha also has experience in event management, networking conference, exhibitions, print and publishing.

== Personal life ==
Pasha has two daughters and one son.

== See also ==
- British Bangladeshi
- List of British Bangladeshis
