= Listed buildings in Hale, Greater Manchester =

Hale is a village in the Metropolitan Borough of Trafford, Greater Manchester, England. The village and the adjacent village of Hale Barns contain 38 listed buildings that are recorded in the National Heritage List for England. Of these, one is listed at Grade I, the highest of the three grades, two are at Grade II*, the middle grade, and the others are at Grade II, the lowest grade.

Hale was originally a rural area, but with the coming of the railway in 1849, it grew and became a commuter area for Manchester. The village became the home for Edgar Wood, an architect who designed buildings in the Arts and Crafts style. The house he designed for himself is listed, together with a number of other houses he designed. Other similar houses were designed by John N. Cocker, who was influenced by Wood, and these too are listed. Most of the earlier listed buildings are houses and associated structures, farmhouses, farm buildings, a chapel, and a Sunday school. The railway station was rebuilt in about 1886, and its platform buildings and footbridge are listed. The other listed buildings include a church, two war memorials, and an air raid siren.

== Key ==
Grade	Criteria
I	Buildings of exceptional interest, sometimes considered to be internationally important
II*	Particularly important buildings of more than special interest
II	Buildings of national importance and special interest

== Buildings ==
Name and location	Photograph	Date	Notes	Grade
Davenportgreen Hall; 53.37411°N 2.29694°W		1617	The original part is timber framed on a stone plinth, a later wing is in rendered brick, and the roof is in stone-slate. There have been later extensions, including a porch. The windows are mullioned and contain casements.	II
Barrow Cottage; 53.36750°N 2.32485°W	—	Late 17th century	A timber framed house with brick nogging and a thatched roof. It has one storey with an attic, three bays, and a gabled brick cross-wing at the right. The windows are casements and eyebrow dormers, and there is a later thatched porch.	II
Paddy's Hut; 53.37608°N 2.29593°W	—	Late 17th century (possible)	Originally a workman's hut, later used for other purposes, it is timber framed with brick nogging and a slate roof. It has a single storey with a loft, and one bay. The side walls have been replaced in brick, and garage doors have been inserted.	II
The Old House; 53.37164°N 2.34641°W	—	1688	The house has been much altered and extended. The original part is timber framed, the later parts are roughcast, and it all has a 20th-century tile roof. The house has one storey with an attic, the original range has three bays, there is a cross-wing to the left with a rendered stone plinth, and later extensions at both ends. There is decorative timber framing in the cross-wing gable, and two gabled dormers. The windows are casements, and at the rear is a canted bay window.	II
The Old Farm; 53.37490°N 2.32712°W	—	1698	The house was extended on a number of occasions. It is in brick with quoins, brick corbel bands, and a stone-slate roof with coped gables. It has an L-shaped plan, two storeys with attics, and single-storey former stables and a garage. In the first bay is a canted bay window, a four-light mullioned window above, and a three-light casement window in the attic, which also has decorative brickwork. The windows elsewhere are casements, and in the angle is the porch with a datestone.	II
Hale Chapel; 53.36548°N 2.31489°W		1723	Originally Presbyterian, later Unitarian, the chapel was altered in about 1880. It is in brick with a slate roof, and has a vestry and a bellcote. The windows are mullioned and transomed with segmental heads, and there is a wall sundial dated 1812. Inside there are box pews.	II*
Ollerbarrow House; 53.37645°N 2.34446°W	—	c. 1750	A farmhouse, later offices, in brick with a slate roof. It has two storeys with an attic, a double-depth plan, three bays, and a left lean-to. In the central bay is a doorway and a gablet. The windows are casements with stone sills and flat brick arches.	II
Hale Chapel Sunday school and schoolmaster's house 53.36908°N 2.31318°W	—	Mid-18th century	The school and house are in brick, mainly roughcast, the school has a stone-slate roof, and the house a tile roof. The school has a single storey, three bays, and pointed arched windows. The house has two storeys with attics, two bays, and casement windows.	II
Buckhall; 53.36414°N 2.29855°W	—	18th century	A farmhouse, later part of a hotel, it is in brick on a stone plinth, with rusticated quoins and a slate roof. There are two storeys with attics, a double-depth plan, and three bays. The central doorway has a rusticated surround and a keystone, and above it is a panel with a heraldic shield and an inscription. The windows are sashes with flat brick arches, keystones, and stone sills.	II
Davenportgreen Farmhouse; 53.37593°N 2.29586°W		18th century	A farmhouse possibly incorporating earlier material, and later a private house, it is in brick with a thatched roof. There is one storey with attics, and three bays. On the front is a 20th-century porch, the windows are casements on the ground floor, and eyebrow dormers above. On the wall of the south gable is a sundial.	II
Sundial, The Old Farm; 53.37485°N 2.32697°W	—	18th century	The sundial is in stone, and consists of a square plinth, a baluster-type shaft, and a fluted bowl. On the top is a copper dial and gnomon.	II
Bank Hall; 53.36834°N 2.33643°W		c. 1760	A rendered brick house with a slate roof. It has three storeys, a double-depth plan, two bays, and lean-tos at the left and the rear. At the extreme right is a two-storey porch, and the windows are 20th-century casements. Inside is an inglenook fireplace and a bressumer.	II
Barn, Davenport Green; 53.37605°N 2.29562°W	—	Late 18th century	A brick barn with a slate roof, it has an L-shaped plan, with a shippon to the left and a stable wing at the right. It contains opposed central doors, a winnowing door with a segmental arch, diamond-shaped honeycomb vents, two pitching holes, a cart entry and a shippon door.	II
Barn, Springvale; 53.36843°N 2.31802°W	—	Late 18th century	The barn is in brick with a slate roof, four bays, and is mainly in two storeys. It contains cart doors, pitching holes, honeycomb vents, and a winnowing door with a semi-elliptical brick arch.	II
Rossmill Farmhouse; 53.36182°N 2.32309°W		Late 18th century	A wing and a porch were added in the 19th century. The house is in brick with a slate roof. It has a U-shaped plan, with a two-bay main range and two cross-wings. Between the wings is a porch. The windows are casements with cambered brick arches and stone sills.	II
Springvale; 53.36848°N 2.31777°W	—	1808	A rendered brick house on a stone plinth, with a dentilled eaves cornice, and a slate roof. There are two storeys, three bays, and a one-bay extension to the right. On the front is a porch, originally in Bowdon railway station, with Tuscan columns and a flat roof, and the doorway has half-Tuscan columns, a fanlight, and an open pediment. The windows are sashes with stone sills.	II
Station Master's House; 53.37857°N 2.34768°W	—	Mid-19th century	Originally a farmhouse, and later used for other purposes, it is in brick with a slate roof. There are two storeys, a double-depth plan, and two bays. Above the door is a pitched canopy, and the windows are sashes with stone sills.	II
West platform building, canopy and signal box, Hale railway station 53.37856°N 2.34756°W		1862	Built by the Cheshire Lines Committee, the station building is in polychrome brick on a stone plinth, and has stone dressings and a slate roof. It has a single storey, five bays, a central doorway, sash windows with brick arched heads, and stone lintels, and at the south end is a signal box. The canopy is in iron, and has columns with crocketed capitals, brackets with arabesque decoration in the spandrels, and a hipped glazed roof.	II
Lychgate, Hale Chapel; 53.36553°N 2.31461°W		c. 1880	The lychgate is at the entrance to the grounds of the chapel. It has a sandstone base, a timber frame, and a stone-slate roof, and the gates contain pierced quatrefoils.	II
East platform waiting rooms and canopy, Hale railway station 53.37854°N 2.34741°W	—	1880s	Built by the Cheshire Lines Committee, the station building is in polychrome brick on a stone plinth, with an eaves band, decorative eaves, a window impost band, and a slate roof. There is a single-story, three-bay waiting room, and a seven-bay canopy with crocketed capitals, brackets with arabesque decoration in the spandrels, a hipped glazed roof, and a pierced valance. The doorways and sash windows have brick arched heads.	II
Footbridge, Hale railway station 53.37881°N 2.34750°W		1880s	The footbridge was built by the Cheshire Lines Committee, and consists of a single-span bridge with flights of steps at right angles to it. It is carried on sets of four cast iron columns with crocketed capitals. The bridge has wrought iron lattice walls, and the walkway is in timber.	II
Halecroft; 53.37359°N 2.32128°W		1890	A detached house by Edgar Wood, it is in brick, partly rendered, on a stone plinth, with stone dressings, quoins, buttresses, and a red clay tile roof. There are two storeys with attics, a five-bay front, a single-storey wing at the rear, and a 20th-century extension to the left. At the left corner is a diagonally-set two-storey bay window. On the front are three unequal gables with bargeboards, one pargetted with a weathervane, another tile-hung with a finial. The doorway has a Tudor arched head above which is an elaborate cartouche, and the windows are mullioned, some also with transoms.	II*
St Peter's Church; 53.37534°N 2.34175°W		1890–92	The church is in brick and red terracotta, and consists of a nave with a tall clerestory, north and south aisles, a chancel with vestries, and a southwest steeple. The steeple has a four-stage tower with a stair turret, octagonal top stages, clock faces, and a polygonal roof with a weathervane in the form of a fish. At the east end is a large five-light window and a finial in the form of a Celtic cross. Along the sides of the church are flying buttresses.	IIl
The Homestead; 53.37565°N 2.32751°W	—	1901	A brick house by Edgar Wood with stone dressings and a stone-slate roof. It has an asymmetrical plan, two storeys with attics, three bays, and a later rear extension. The left bay has a two-storey canted bay window, and there is a single-storey canted bay window in the right bay. In the right gable end is a doorway that has a semicircular head with a keystone, and above it is an upper floor room that is gabled and weatherboarded. The windows are mullioned, some with transoms.	II
Greystoke; 53.37623°N 2.32631°W	—	1902	A brick house by Edgar Wood with a stone-slate roof, an asymmetrical plan, and two storeys with attics. There are four bays, a single-storey diagonal wing, and a three-storey canted tower with a coped gable. There is a hipped porch, two gables, and mullioned windows, one also with a transom, and on the left side is a two-storey canted bay window.	II
The Hollies; 53.37524°N 2.32873°W	—	1902	A brick house by Edgar Wood with a clay tile roof and crested ridge tiles, an asymmetrical plan, two storeys with attics, and three bays. In the left bay is a projecting gabled wing with a bow window, and in the centre bay is a gabled porch with a semicircular-headed doorway. In the right return is a two-storey canted bay window. The windows are mullioned, some with transoms.	II
Cintra; 53.37507°N 2.32926°W	—	1903	A brick house by Edgar Wood with a blue slate roof, two storeys, and a projecting semi-octagonal wing at the left. There is a central single-storey porch with a hipped roof on timber columns with balustrading and a semicircular doorway. In the left gable end is a polygonal bay window and a garage. The windows are casements, and there is a dormer window.	II
The Garth; 53.37601°N 2.32687°W	—	1905	A brick house by Edgar Wood that has a stone-slate roof with coped gables, an asymmetrical plan, two storeys, and a long left single-storey wing on the left. The front has two gables, a two-storey canted bay window to the left and a doorway to the right with a stone surround and a flat hood, and a segmental lunette above it. There are canted bay windows in the right return and in the wing, and the windows are mullioned, some also with transoms.	II
The Shiel; 53.37541°N 2.32804°W	—	1906	A brick house by Edgar Wood that has a stone-slate roof with coped gables. There is an asymmetrical plan, two storeys, and three bays. The central bay projects, it is gabled, and has a doorway with a dentilled architrave and a flat hood. In the left return is a two-storey canted bay window. The windows are mullioned, some with transoms.	II
Broadoaks; 53.37507°N 2.32927°W	—	1907	A house, later apartments, by Edgar Wood in brick with stone dressings, thin stone quoins, and a clay tile roof. It has an asymmetrical plan, two storeys with attics, and three bays. The central bay projects, and contains a hipped porch. There are two canted bay windows, one in the left gable with two storeys, and the other at the rear with one storey. The windows are casements, some with transoms.	II
Barrowcroft; 53.37778°N 2.32786°W	—	1907–08	A pair of semi-detached houses by John N Cocker in brick with a stone-slate roof. They have two storeys with attics and two bays each, the outer bays having a coped gable and pilasters. On the ground floor are six-light mullioned and transomed windows, and in the outer bays are seven-light canted bay windows. On the upper floor are five-light mullioned windows, and in the attics are three-light windows. On the sides are two-storey segmental bow windows, and doors.	II
Cross Heyes; 53.37739°N 2.32718°W	—	1907–08	A brick house by John N Cocker with stone dressings and a stone-slate roof. It has an asymmetrical plan, two storeys with attics, and three bays. In the first bay is a two-storey bow window, the second bay contains a doorway with a semicircular head, a fanlight and a later porch. The windows are mullioned, some also with transoms, and they contain casements.	II
Tiverton; 53.37721°N 2.32679°W	—	1907–08	A brick house by John N Cocker with a stone-slate roof and an asymmetrical plan. It has two storeys with attics and three bays. The first bay projects forward, and the upper floor is weatherboarded and gabled. In the second bay is a single-storey bow window. The windows are mullioned, some also with transoms, and they contain casements. In the right gable, which is also weatherboarded, is a two-storey bay window.	II
Turvelaws and White Thorn Lodge; 53.37756°N 2.32751°W	—	1907–08	A pair of semi-detached houses by John N Cocker in brick with a stone-slate roof. They have two storeys with attics, and a symmetrical front with two bays on each house. In the inner bays are mullioned and transomed windows on the ground floor, and mullioned windows on the upper floor. In the attics are three-light windows, decorative plaster panels, and gables. The outer bays each has a two-storey canted bay window, and the doors are on the sides.	II
Royd House; 53.37659°N 2.32690°W	—	1914–16	The house was designed by Edgar Wood for his own use. It is in brick with coped stepped parapets, moulded brick corners, and a flat concrete roof. The house has two storeys, a Y-shaped plan with the base at the rear, and has three concave sides. There is a recessed porch with plain columns, a coffered ceiling, and above it is a mullioned window set in a coloured tile panel, and there are mullioned and mullioned and transomed windows elsewhere. At the rear, which is flat, are three bays with a central canted bay window and a pierced parapet.	I
Hale Barns and Ringway war memorial 53.36989°N 2.31549°W		c. 1920	The war memorial stands in an island in a road junction. It is in stone, and consists of a wheel-head cross on a tapering octagonal shaft. This is on a chamfered square pedestal on an octagonal base. On each face of the pedestal is a roundel in low relief containing a wreath and a lion. Also on the pedestal are inscriptions and the names of those lost in the two World Wars.	II
Hale war memorial 53.38007°N 2.34097°W		c. 1920	The war memorial stands at a road junction. It consists of s bronze statue of a soldier in battledress standing on a tall tapering stone plinth. This is on a pedestal and a stepped base. On the plinth is an inscription, and on the pedestal is a bronze plaque and a band decorated with bay leaves.	II
Air raid siren 53.37567°N 2.34650°W	—	1938	The air raid siren surviving from the onset of the Second World War is in a small rectangular enclosure. It consists of a tubular steel post supporting an electrically driven siren, with a brick-built equipment cabinet.	II
