= Hale Barns =

Village in Greater Manchester, England

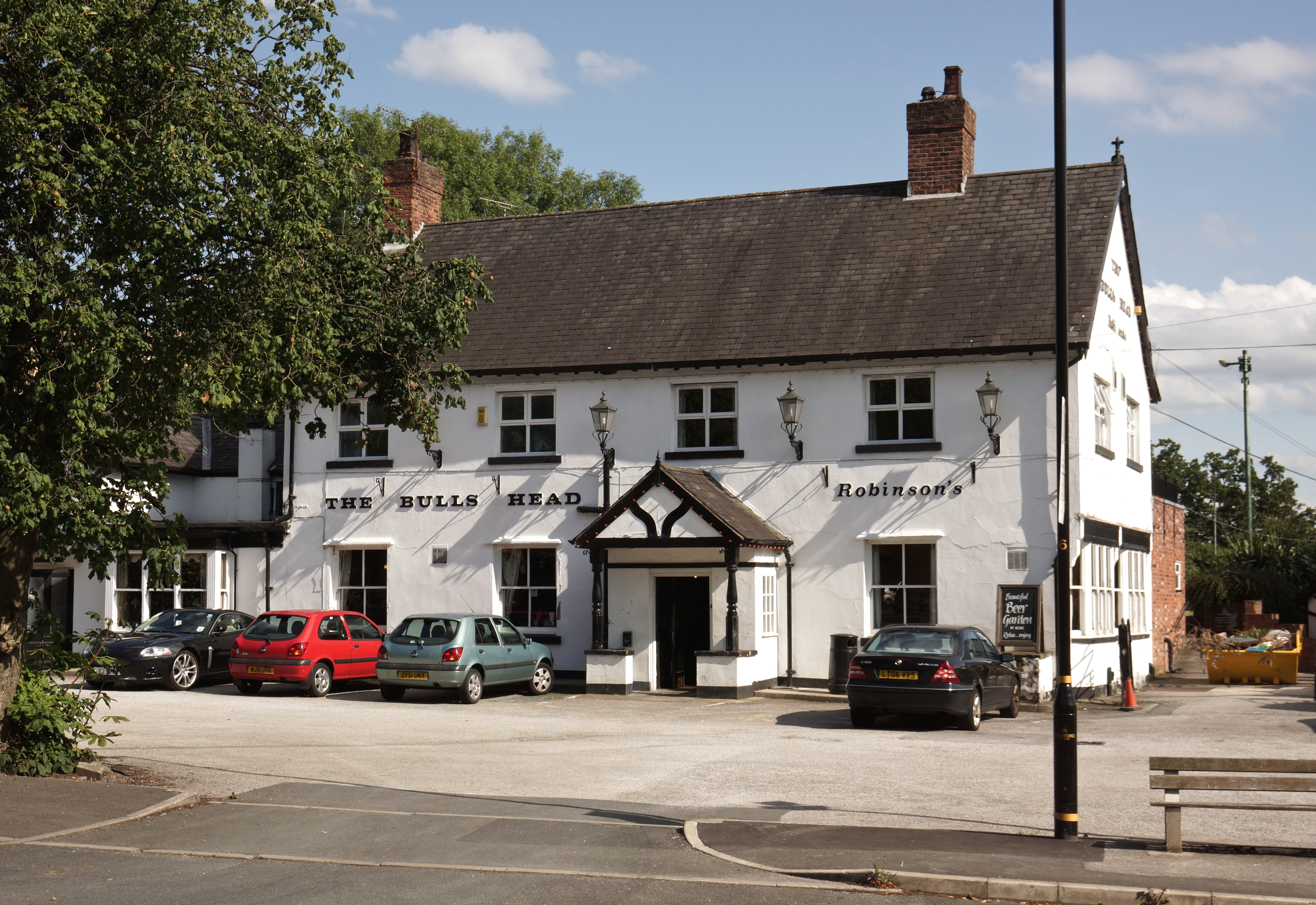
- The Bulls Head public house, Hale Barns

- Location within Greater Manchester
- Population: 9,736 (2011 Census)
- OS grid reference: SJ791855
- Metropolitan borough: Trafford
- Metropolitan county: Greater Manchester
- Region: North West
- Country: England
- Sovereign state: United Kingdom
- Post town: Altrincham
- Postcode district: WA15
- Dialling code: 0161
- Police: Greater Manchester
- Fire: Greater Manchester
- Ambulance: North West
- UK Parliament: Altrincham and Sale

Hale Barns is a village near Altrincham in Greater Manchester, England. It lies in the historic county of Cheshire, 8 miles (13 km) south-west of Manchester city centre, 2 miles west of Manchester Airport and close to the River Bollin. At the 2011 census, the village had a population of 9,736.

Medieval Hale Barns was an outlying area of the township of Hale, but a growth in prosperity led to it becoming a separate settlement. The village gets its name from the tithe barn that used to stand there. Before the industrial revolution, Hale Barns was an agricultural village, but since then evolved into a commuter settlement. St Ambrose College Roman Catholic boys' grammar school is in Hale Barns and the village is also home to Ringway golf club. Cotteril Clough in Hale Barns is an ancient and diverse woodland and a Site of Special Scientific Interest.

== History ==
What were thought to be fragments of Roman pottery tiles were found in Hale Barns in the 1880s near the site of what is now St Ambrose College. The artefacts were lost before their antiquity could be confirmed, but led local historian W. Thompson Wakin to suggest there was probably a Roman villa in the area.

The first reference to Hale is contained within the Domesday Book, at the time 'Hale Barns' was just an outlying hamlet contained within the manor of Hale. According to the Domesday Book, the manor of Hale was owned by a Saxon thegn Aelfward, who was replaced by the Norman, Hamon de Massey who also gained possession of Dunham and Bowdon and would remain barons of the area until the 14th century. The manor was considered prosperous in comparison to other manors in the north west of England.

The settlements of Hale and Hale Barns are closely linked; what would later become Hale Barns spent most of the medieval period as an extension of the more dominant Hale. During this era the land around Hale and Hale Barns was used agriculturally because although the soil is poor draining, it is fertile. By the middle of the 15th century, Hale Barns had established an identity completely separate from neighbouring Hale as demonstrated by the tithe barn which was established around this time. The tithe barn was for storing the tithes – a tenth of the farm's produce which was to be given to the church. Such an establishment can be seen as a sign of the area's prosperity. The original barn no longer survives but there is a drawing of it (from 1844). It is the source of the village's name. The first explicit reference to the village of Hale Barns – rather than Hale – is in a document from 1616.

In the 17th century, The Civil War affected all of England; many families were split over Royalist or Parliamentarian loyalties. Little is recorded, however, of the divisions within Hale Barns, and Hale and Hale Barns did emerge from the Civil War largely untouched by events – though there was a heavy tax to pay to support the Parliamentarian army they avoided much of the requisitioning of supplies and animals for passing armies. None of the Royalists in Hale and Hale Barns had their lands confiscated or was forced to pay fines.

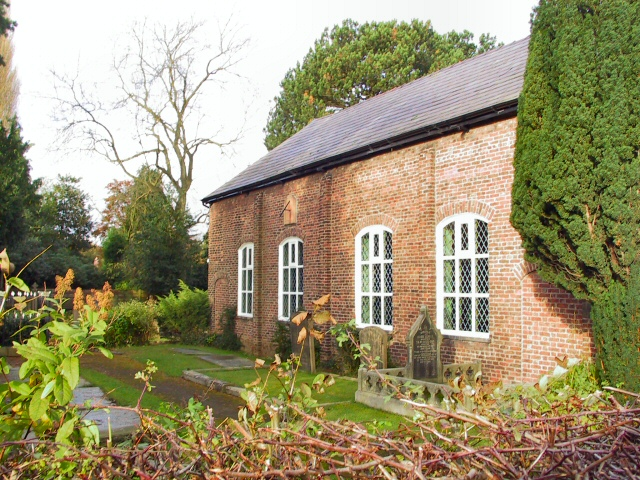
Hale Chapel was built in 1723.

Having long been agricultural land, in the 18th century the town was divided up into five farms: Tanyard, Partington, Oakfield, Broadoak, and Elm. Hale Chapel was established in Hale Barns by Nonconformists in 1723 on what is now Chapel Lane. It underwent alterations around 1880. The chapel is the earliest place of worship in either Hale or Hale Barns and is a Grade II* listed building, one of only nine in Trafford. It also houses an eighteenth-century pulpit and nineteenth-century stained glass. In 1740, a school was founded by the Unitarian minister of Hale – a time when education was a rare commodity – and can be seen on a map of 1800 along with a tithe barn, two inns, five farms, four cottages, the school house and school rooms.

In the late 19th century a building called "Manor House" was built on the site of the old Tanyard Farm, for the purpose of the owner's retirement. In 2006 a timber-framed barn built around 1701 – originally belonging to the Tanyard Farm and later converted to stables for Manor House – was demolished because, in the opinion of the Local Authority, it was now “a dangerous building”. It was taken down, step-by-step, with Local Authority figures and others present who recorded and photographed the demolition. The local M. P., Graham Brady, was kept informed at all stages. The Grade II listed building – known as "Manor House Stables" – was the last timber-framed building in Hale Barns.

During the 20th century, urbanisation affected Hale Barns, turning the place from an agricultural village into the commuter settlement it is today, focused around The Square – a shopping precinct. Its main A538 road – Hale Road – runs through the centre of Hale Barns and leads towards Manchester Airport and Wilmslow.

=== Toponymy ===
The name Hale, which occurs throughout Britain, derives from the Anglo-Saxon halh meaning a nook or shelter, as supported by the surrounding area which has natural features that would provide shelter. "Barns" comes from the Old Tithe Barn.

== Governance ==
Hale Barns is part of Trafford Metropolitan Borough of Greater Manchester. Up until local government reforms in 1974, Hale Barns formed part of the administrative county of Cheshire. The Hale Barns and Timperley South ward has three out of sixty-three seats on Trafford Council, and at the 2023 Trafford Metropolitan Borough Council election all three seats were held by the Conservatives with Michael Taylor, Nathan Evans and Dylan Butt being elected. Since 1997, Hale Barns has formed part of the Altrincham and Sale West Constituency, before that it was encompassed by the Altrincham and Sale constituency. Since the formation of the Altrincham and Sale West constituency in 1997 it was represented in the House of Commons by the Conservative MP, Sir Graham Brady. Following the 2024 general election, this seat has been held by Connor Rand.

== Geography ==
Hale Barns is located at 53°22′3.36″N 2°19′4.8″W (53.3676, −2.318), 8 miles (13 km) to the south of Manchester city centre. It is just east of Hale and south east of Altrincham. The town is bounded by the River Bollin to the south, the M56 to the east and the residential areas of Altrincham to the west and Newall Green to the north. The ward profile produced by Trafford MBC describes its location and economic nature as follows.

"Hale Barns lies at the southern tip of the Borough (of Trafford) ... The Ward contains a large amount of agricultural land including two private golf courses. There is also a number of private sports clubs within the Ward providing facilities for tennis, bowling and football. It is generally considered to be an affluent Ward in the top 10% wealthiest areas in England."

— Trafford MBC 2006

The climate of Hale Barns – and Greater Manchester as a whole – is generally temperate, with few extremes of temperature or weather. The mean temperature is slightly above average for the United Kingdom; whereas annual rainfall and average amount of sunshine is slightly below the average for the UK.

== Demography ==
Hale Barns compared
2001 UK Census	Hale Barns	Trafford	England
Total population	9,143	210,145	49,138,831
White	91.9%	92%	91%
Asian	6.5%	4.6%	4.6%
Black	0.4%	2.0%	2.3%
Christian	70.4%	76%	72%
Jewish	7.9%	1.1%	0.5%
No religion	9.5%	12%	15%
Over 65 years old	21.8%	16%	16%

At the 2001 UK census, the village of Hale Barns had a total population of 9,143 and 3732 households. Of those households, 44% were married couples living together, 5% were co-habiting couples and 6% were lone parents. The town had a high percentage of households made up of married couples (44%) compared to the figure for the rest of Trafford (37%) and England (also 37%). The average household size was 2.45. For every 100 females, there were 93.9 males.

The ethnicity of the Hale Barns is 91.9% white, 1.1% mixed race, 0.4% black, 5.4% non-Chinese Asian, and 1.2% Chinese. The age distribution was 6% aged 0–4 years, 15% aged 5–15 years, 4% aged 16–19 years, 27% aged 20–44 years, 27% aged 45–64 years and 22% aged 65 years and over. The town had a high percentage of residents over 65, compared with the national average of 16%.

The Trafford MBC Ward Profile for the Hale Barns ward describes it as being

"Diverse in nature and home to a large Jewish and Muslim community groups."

– Trafford MBC 2006

== Religion ==
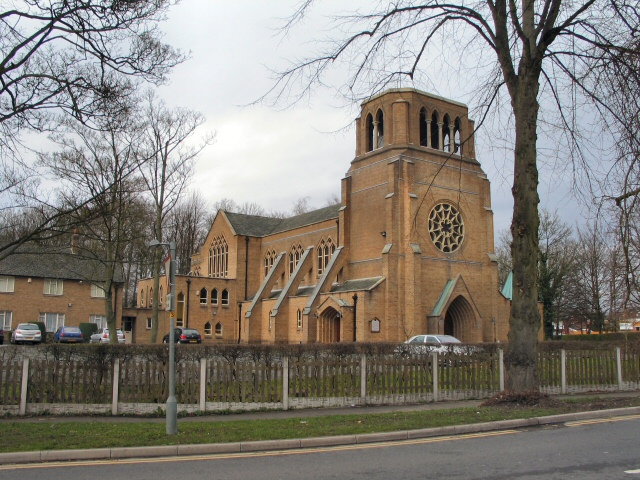
The Roman Catholic Holy Angels' Church

According to the 2001 census, the religious make up of Hale Barns is 70.4% Christian, 7.9% Jewish, 4.1% Muslim, 1.5% Hindu, 0.3% Buddhist and 0.1% Sikh. 9.5% were recorded as having no religion, 0.1% had an alternative religion and 6.2% did not state their religion. Hale Barns is in the Anglican Diocese of Chester. and the Roman Catholic Diocese of Shrewsbury.

Places of worship include All Saints' Church (Church of England) built in 1967 and the large Roman Catholic Church of the Holy Angels' Church, situated in Wicker Lane at the junction with Hale Road at the western end of the village centre and linked to St Ambrose College.

Hale and District Synagogue serves Ashkenazi Jews across Hale and Hale Barns and is situated on Shay Lane in Hale Barns. It was rebuilt on its previous site in 2003; the modern structure has a synagogue, nursery, function suite and dedicated study room Beit HaMidrash. It is also the site of the South Manchester Mikveh with a utensil mikveh that is adjuncted to the main mikveh building.

There is also a newly built synagogue for the Sephardic community called Sha'are Rachamim. South Manchester has been home to Sephardic Jews and a Western Sephardic community since the early twentieth century. This new building is for a community established in Didsbury in 1904, before moving synagogue to Withington in 1927. At that time the area also saw the establishment of an Eastern Sephardic community, Shaare Zedek. The two communities merged under the name Shaare Hayim at the end of the century, and alternate between and combine the various Sephardic traditions and melodies, now housed together in the new purpose built facility.

== Education ==
The badge of St. Ambrose College has remained the same since the school was established in 1946.

Because of its small size, Hale Barns has few schools. Amongst them are St Ambrose College which provides education for 11- to 18-year-olds and Elmridge Primary.

Primary schools

Elmridge Primary School is a co-educational day school. It had 240 pupils in the 2011/12 school year.

Secondary schools

St. Ambrose College is a Roman Catholic Boys’ Secondary School situated adjacent to Holy Angels’ Church and Hale Road, near the centre of Hale Barns village. The Christian Brothers came to England from Guernsey during the Second World War and remained to establish the college in 1945. The college celebrated its 60th anniversary in 2006. The school is a specialist Maths and Computing College.

In 2005 around 800 pupils attended the school. The College was awarded funding in the summer of 2006 for rebuilding on the current site as part of the Building Schools for the Future Programme. In 2006, 98.3% of pupils achieved at least 5 A*-C grades at GCSE compared to an average of 66.7% for all secondary schools in Trafford and a national UK average of 61.3%; 97.5% of its pupils gained at least 5 A*-C grades at GCSE including English and maths, ranking the school 4th out of Trafford's 19 secondary schools.

== Economy ==
According to Trafford MBC, Hale Barns is in the top 10% wealthiest areas in England. At the 2001 UK census, the Hale Barns ward had a possible workforce of approximately 6,449 people. The economic activity of residents in the Hale Barns electoral ward was 36% in full-time employment, 12% in part-time employment, 28% self-employed, 1.5% unemployed, 1.7% students with jobs, 4.7% students without jobs, 18.7% retired, 7.3% looking after home or family, 2.6% permanently sick or disabled and 2.2% economically inactive for other reasons. Hale Barns has a very high rate of self-employment (28%) compared with rest of Trafford (16%) and England (17%). Hale Barns also has low rates of unemployment (1.5%) compared with Trafford (2.7%) and England (3.3%). The Office for National Statistics estimated that during the period of April 2001 to March 2002 the average gross weekly income of households in Hale Barns was £660 (£34,320 per year).

According to the 2001 UK census, the industry of employment of residents in Hale Barns was 22.9% property and business services, 15.7% retail and wholesale, 12.1% health and social work, 11.0% manufacturing, 9.4% education, 6.8% transport and communications, 4.7% finance, 4.5% construction, 3.9% hotels and restaurants, 3.2% public administration and defence, 0.6% energy and water supply, 0.5% agriculture, and 4.6% other. This was roughly in line with national figures, except for the town's relatively high percentage of workers in property and business services.

A shopping centre was built in Hale Barns in the 1960s called "The Square Shopping Centre". The site was being considered for redevelopment and proposals were subjected to consultation in 2005. In 2007 the Council and Developer participated in a Planning Inquiry after the council refused planning permission for the proposed redevelopment. However, in 2013, the council agreed, and the new shopping Centre, containing a Booths and a Costa Coffee, is now open.

== Leisure and recreation ==
There are a number of private sports clubs within the Hale Barns providing facilities for tennis, bowling and football. This includes the home of Hale Barns Cricket Club.

Halecroft Park

Halecroft Park is near the centre of Hale Barns and was crowned North West region winner in the prestigious 'Britain's Best Park' competition. Designed by Edgar Wood, the ornamental gardens of Halecroft Park were created in 1891 as part of Halecroft House. The park was winner of the Green Flag Award 3 years running (2003–2006) for setting a standard for parks and green spaces in England and Wales.

The Tennis Club Hale Barns

Private members tennis club with 5 astroturf courts, one floodlit, established in 1924 at The Pavilion, Chapel Lane.

Ringway Golf Club

Covering 18 holes and 6,482 yards, Ringway Golf Club was designed by Harry Colt in 1909 and further developed by James Braid.

Ringway & Hale Barns WI

Founded in 1957, Ringway & Hale Barns WI has around 25 members. Meetings are normally held on the fourth Thursday of the month at the All Saints Church Hall, Hale Road, WA15 8SP, starting at 7.30 pm.

Cotteril Clough

Cotteril Clough is a Site of Special Scientific Interest situated close to the River Bollin. It has been designated due to its ancient woodland which is among the most diverse in Greater Manchester. It is managed by the Cheshire Wildlife Trust.

== See also ==
- Listed buildings in Hale, Greater Manchester
