= BPPI =

BBPI may stand for:

- Broadway Play Publishing Inc., an American publishing company established in 1982
- British Bangladeshi Power & Inspiration 100, an annual British publication listing the 100 leading British Bangladeshi figures established in 2012
