= Thruxton Karting Circuit =

Kart racing circuit in Hampshire, England

- Location: Hampshire, England
- Length: 1.1 km (0.68 mi)
- Turns: 18
- Race lap record: 0:49.200 (bskc, Kart 13, 2020)

Thruxton Karting Circuit is a kart racing circuit situated at Thruxton Circuit in Hampshire. At 1,100 metres long, the full circuit has a variety of fast, slow and technical corners.

The centre has a hospitality building and often hosts the British Schools Karting Championship and various endurance races and championships.

== Key information ==
There are a total of five track layouts:

Club Circuit (365m, 146m, 130m variations)

National Circuit (1100m, 900m variations)

There are 3 different types of Karts:

4.0 hp Cadet Karts for drivers of 8+

5.5 hp Stratos Karts for drivers of 12+

13 hp Thunderkarts for drivers of 15+
