= Khatun Sapnara =

Bangladeshi-born British judge (born 1967)

Her Honour Judge Khatun Sapnara
- খাতুন সাপনারা

Personal details
- Born: 29 April 1967 (age 59) Sylhet District, East Pakistan
- Children: 2
- Education: Law, Political Science
- Alma mater: London School of Economics; University of London; Middle Temple
- Occupation: Barrister, judge

Khatun Sapnara (Bengali: খাতুন সাপনারা; born 29 April 1967) is a Bangladeshi-born British judge. In 2006, she was appointed a Recorder of the Crown Court, becoming the first person of Bangladeshi origin in a senior judicial position. In 2014, she was appointed as a Circuit Judge to hear cases in the Crown and Family Court. In October 2024, she was appointed as the Designated Family Judge of the Central Family Court.

== Early life ==
Sapnara was born in Sylhet District, East Pakistan (now Bangladesh) and moved to the United Kingdom as a child. Her father, the late Mimbor Ali, was honoured by the Bangladeshi government for his significant contribution to the liberation of Bangladesh.

Sapnara attended Chadwell Heath School (now Chadwell Heath Academy). In 1988, she graduated with LLB (Hons) from the London School of Economics and Political Science.

== Career ==
In 1990, Sapnara was called to the Bar at Middle Temple. She practises from Coram Barristers Chambers in London and specialises in Family law.

In 2003, Sapnara became the first ethnic minority person to be elected to the Family Law Bar Association Committee. In 2004, she was appointed by the Lord Chancellor Baron Charles Falconer of Thoroton to the Family Justice Council, a body of experts which advises the government on all aspects of the family justice system. She is an expert in "honour-based" violence, and assisted in formulating and drafting the Forced Marriage (Civil Protection) Act 2007. In 2006, she was appointed as a Recorder of the Crown.

In 2012, she was involved in proposals to criminalise forced marriage, arguing against criminalisation, contending that it was surplus to requirements and that the move could deter victims from seeking help. She wrote in a joint newspaper article that it was a "quick-fix solution to a complex and long-standing problem." In June 2012, she appeared on BBC Two's Newsnight, debating against criminalisation of forced marriage with Aneeta Prem of Freedom Charity.

In March 2014, she was appointed as a Circuit Judge sitting at both the East London Family Court and at Kingston upon Thames Crown Court.

Between 2003 and 2014, Sapnara was Chair of the Ashiana Network, a refuge and support agency for female victims of domestic violence and forced marriage. She has served as director/chair of a number of charities and voluntary sector organisations and lectures widely on issues relating to family law including to the Judicial College (formerly the Judicial Studies Board).

In October 2024, she was appointed as the Designated Family Judge of the Central Family Court.

== Recognition ==
In January 2015, Sapnara was named the "Person of the Year" in the British Bangladeshi Power & Inspiration 100. She was recognised for her "outstanding achievement" as the first person of British Bangladeshi origin to acquire a senior judicial position.

== Personal life ==
Sapnara is a practising Muslim. She is married with two children.

== See also ==
- British Bangladeshis
- List of British Bangladeshis
