= Royd House =

Building in Hale, Greater Manchester, England

Coordinates: 53°22′35″N 2°19′37″W

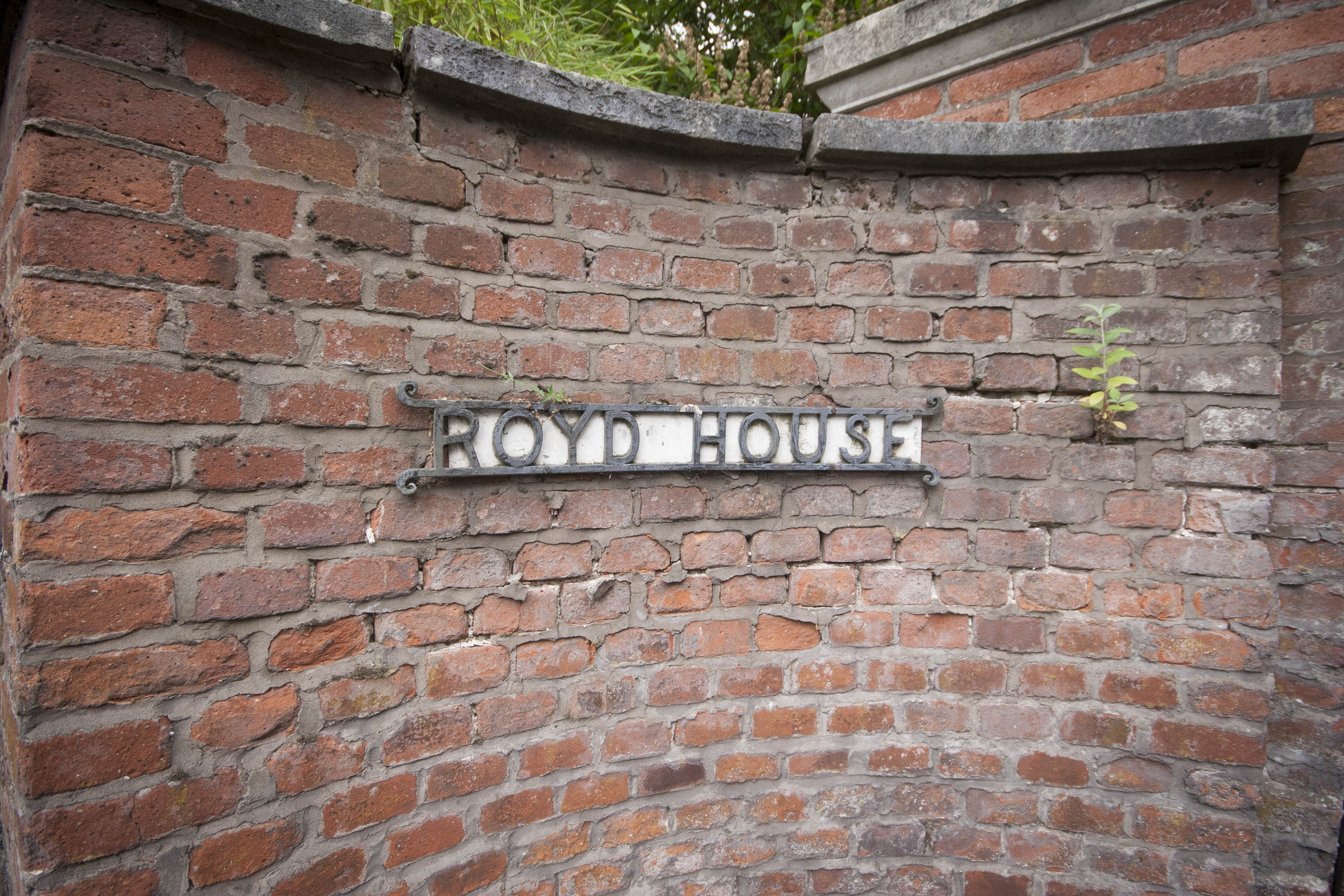
Royd House sign Hale

Royd House is a Grade I listed building in Hale, Greater Manchester. It was designed by architect Edgar Wood as his own home and was built between 1914 and 1916. The building is regarded as one of the most advanced examples of early twentieth century domestic architecture. It is one of six Grade I listed buildings in Trafford.

Royd House is a 2-storey, Y-shaped building with a concrete roof. It has a concave façade and is faced in Portland red stone and Lancashire brick.

== See also ==
- Grade I listed buildings in Greater Manchester
- Listed buildings in Hale, Greater Manchester
- Upmeads, a similar earlier design by Wood
