= Curry Life =

British trade magazine

- Chief editor: Syed Nahas Pasha
- Editor: Syed Belal Ahmed
- Categories: Business
- Frequency: Bi-monthly
- Founder: Syed Belal Ahmed; Syed Nahas Pasha
- Founded: March 2003
- First issue: March 2003
- Country: United Kingdom
- Based in: Ilford, Essex
- Language: English
- Website: www.currylifemagazine.com

Curry Life is a British independent bi-monthly trade magazine for the Bangladeshi and Indian restaurant and takeaways in the United Kingdom.

== Content ==
Curry Life was launched in March, 2003. The magazine was founded by Syed Belal Ahmed and Syed Nahas Pasha, who are editors of the magazine.

The magazine started out as a newsletter and developed into a 50-page glossy magazine. It is distributed to over 12,000 Bangladeshi and Indian restaurants in the UK. and is free for curry restaurants in the UK, available in some specialist newsagents and selective Asian supermarkets, and is widely distributed and read all over the world. It has an estimated readership of over 100,000 and also has a presence in Europe, Middle East and South Asia. The magazine is available through subscription for a yearly fee of £20 in the UK or £30 elsewhere.

The magazine is the only independent magazine in the field and has been described as the "voice of the curry industry". It contains news and features on a variety of issues affecting the Asian catering sector. It also includes restaurant profiles, interviews, recipes, film reviews, and travel articles. Its aim is to create a better business environment for the restaurant industry.

The magazine has hosted festivals in South East Asian countries such as Bangladesh and India, Europe and the Middle East. In December 2014, the Curry Life Business Achievement Awards was launched. In March 2015, Curry Life organised the Hyatt Regency's The Taste of Britain Curry festival.

== See also ==
- Business of British Bangladeshis
