= Janomot =

- Front page on 17 – 23 April 2011
- Type: Weekly newspaper
- Format: Tabloid
- Owner(s): Amirul Islam Choudhury, Junaid Choudhury
- Publisher: Publication 1969 Limited
- Editor: Syed Nahas Pasha
- Founded: 21 February 1969
- Language: Bengali
- Headquarters: Unit 2, 20b Spelman Street, Aldgate, London, England
- Circulation: 4000
- Website: www.janomot.com

Janomot (Bengali: জনমত) is a British Bengali-language weekly newspaper.

== Content ==
Janomot was founded in London and established on 21 February 1969. It is the first Bengali newsweekly published outside Bangladesh.

The newspaper's regular features include home and international news and politics. It has subscribers in Germany, France, Spain, Austria, Australia, the U.S., Canada, Africa, the Middle East and Bangladesh.

== See also ==
- British Bangladeshi
- List of newspapers in London
