= Hale Chapel =

Unitarian chapel in Greater Manchester, England

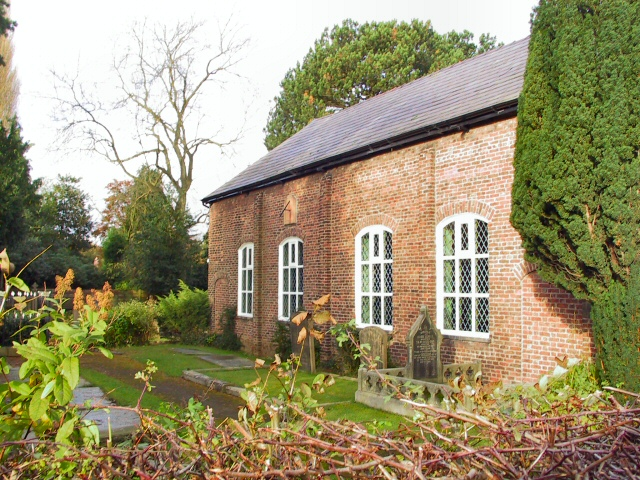
- Hale Chapel

- Location within Greater Manchester

General information
- Location: Hale Barns, Greater Manchester, England
- Coordinates: 53.367931°N 2.316389°W
- Completed: 1723

Design and construction
- Designations

Listed Building – Grade II*
- Official name: Hale Chapel
- Designated: 2 March 1950
- Reference no.: 1356500

Website
- halechapel.co.uk

Hale Chapel is a Unitarian chapel in Hale Barns, Greater Manchester, England (grid reference SJ789857). The chapel was built in 1723 and was originally a Presbyterian meeting house. A vestry was added c.1880 and around the same time alterations were made to the rest of the building. The chapel features an 18th-century pulpit and 19th century stained glass. Hale Chapel is the earliest place of worship in either Hale or Hale Barns.

== See also ==
Listed buildings in Hale, Greater Manchester

- Grade II* listed buildings in Greater Manchester
- Listed buildings in Hale, Greater Manchester
