= Trafford =

Borough in Greater Manchester, England

Metropolitan Borough of Trafford
- Metropolitan borough
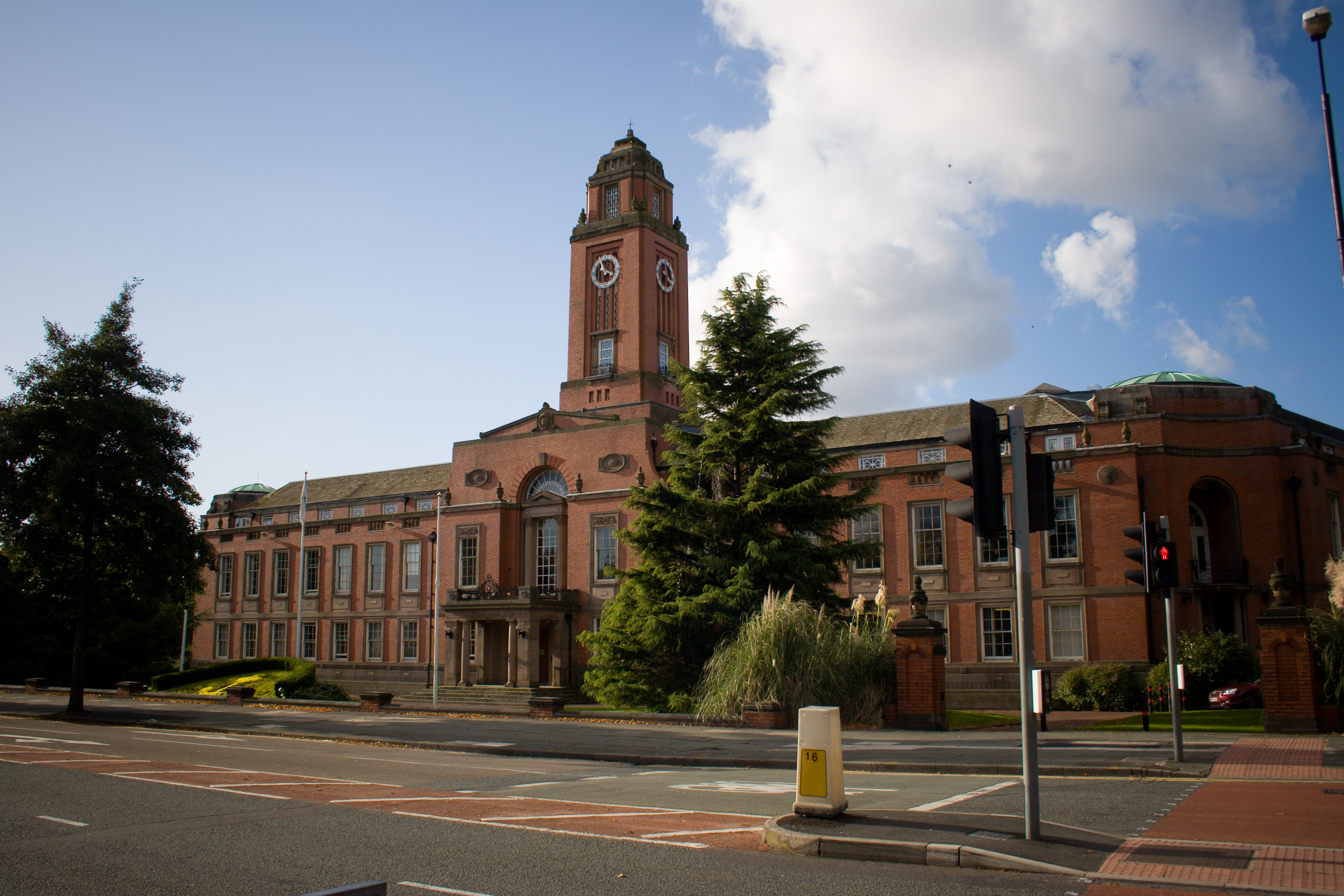
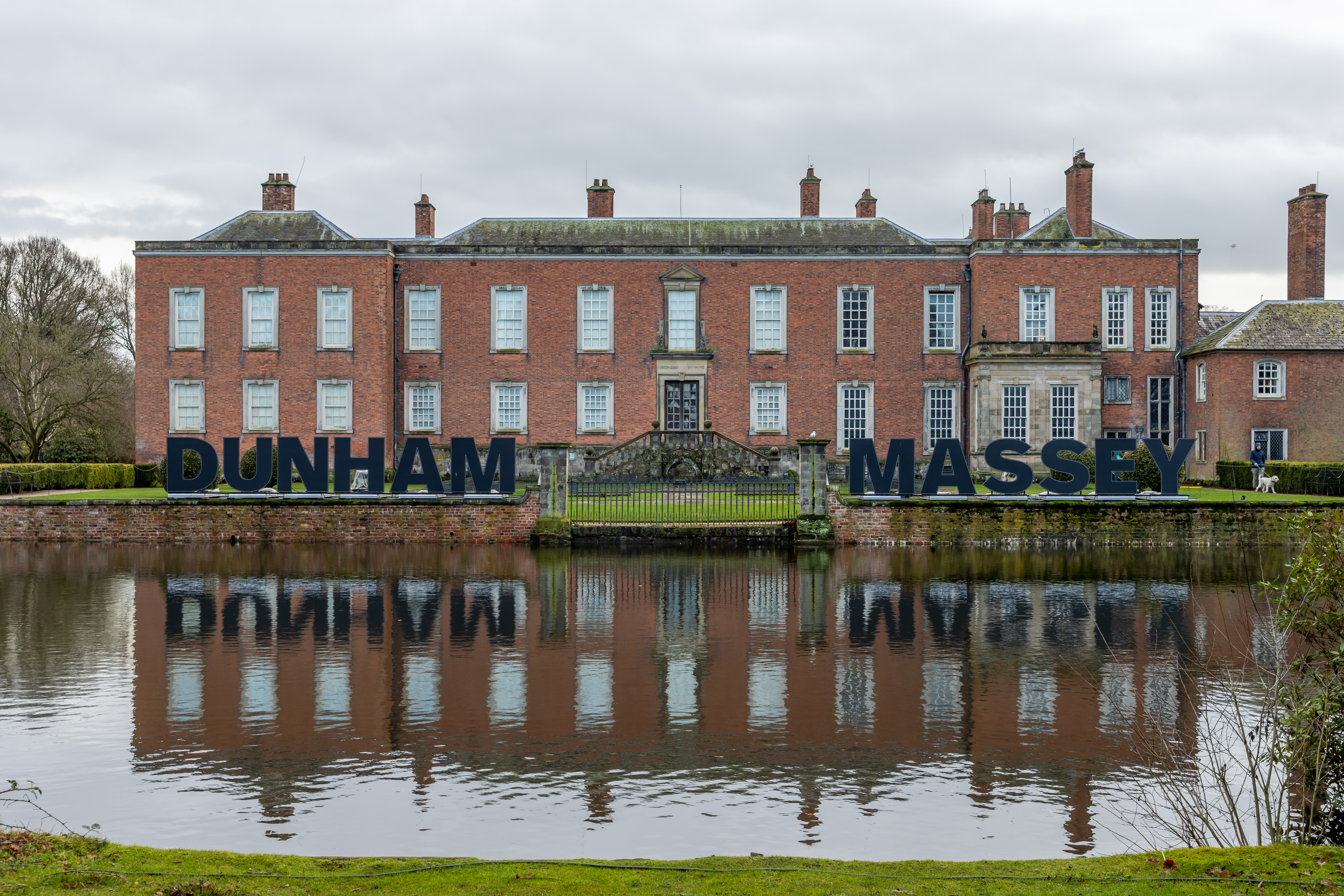
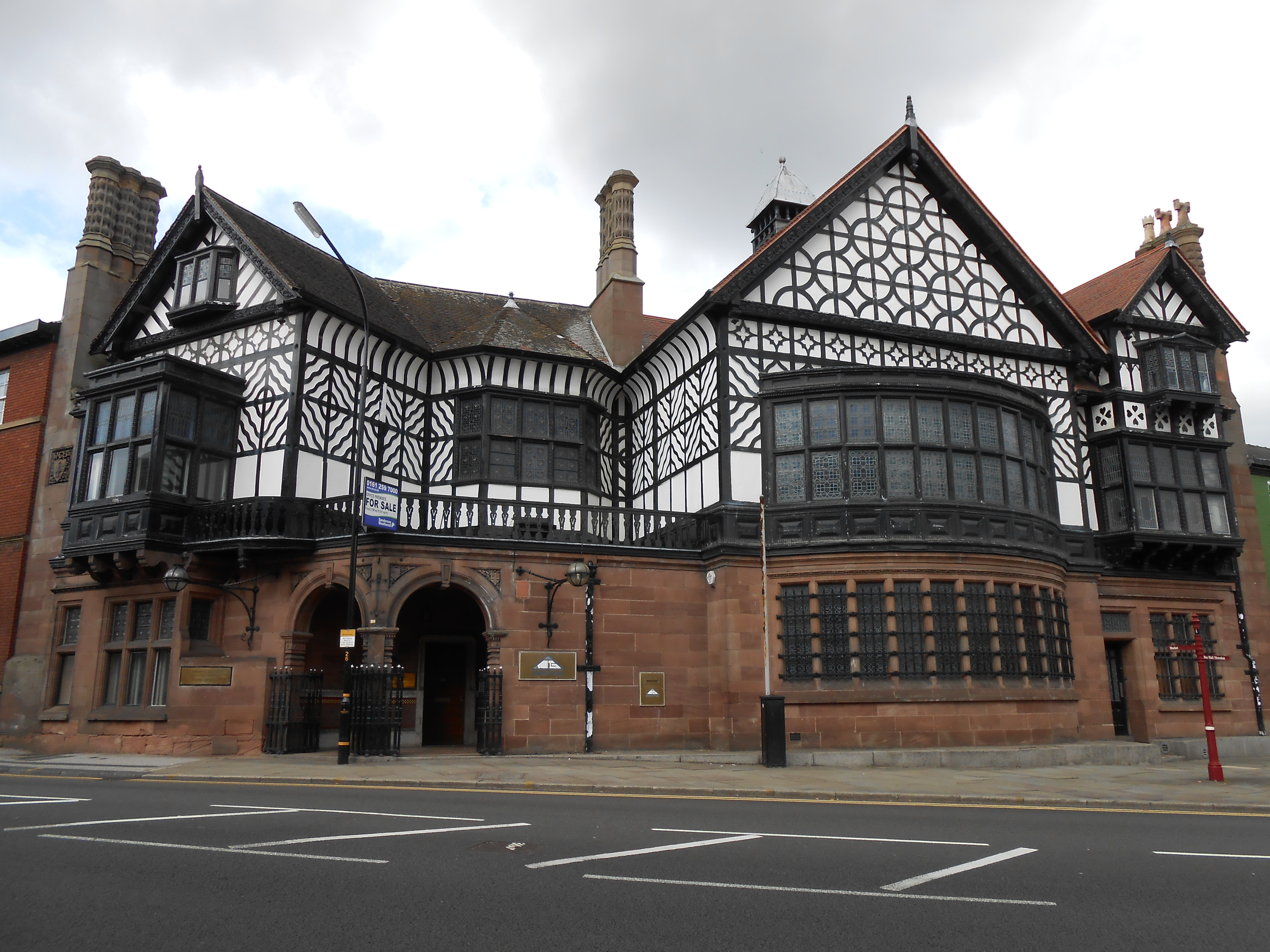
- Clockwise from the top; Trafford Town Hall, Old Market Square in Altrincham and Dunham Massey Hall

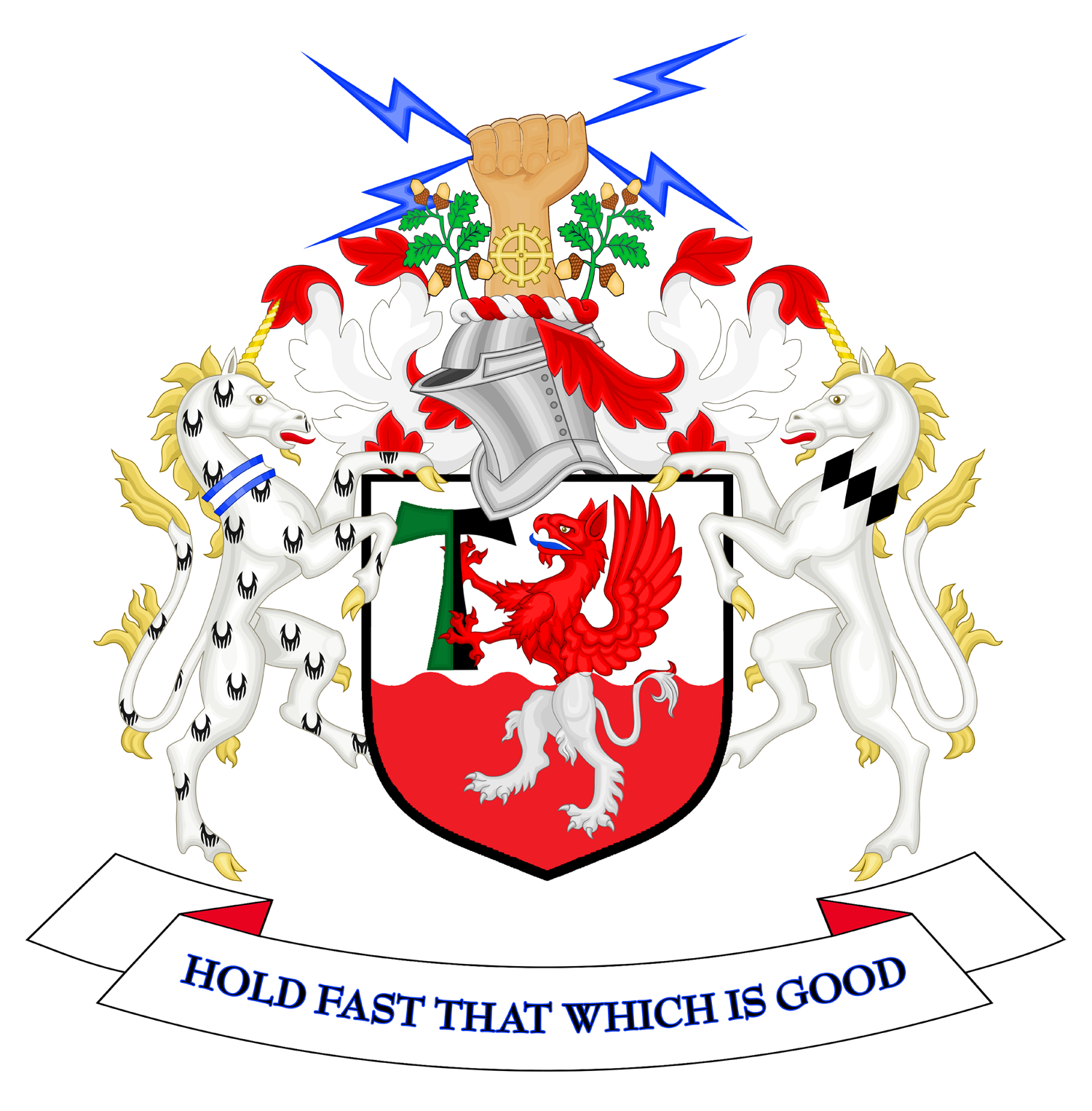
- Coat of arms
- Motto: Hold fast that which is good
- Trafford shown within Greater Manchester
- Coordinates: 53°26′46″N 2°18′29″W
- Sovereign state: United Kingdom
- Country: England
- Region: North West
- Ceremonial county and city region: Greater Manchester
- Incorporated: 1 April 1974
- Administrative HQ: Trafford Town Hall

Government
  - Type: Metropolitan borough
  - Body: Trafford Council
  - Executive: Leader and cabinet
  - Control: Labour
  - Leader: Tom Ross (L)
  - Mayor: Jane Brophy
  - MPs: 3 MPs: Connor Rand (L); Mike Kane (L); Andrew Western (L)

Area
  - Total: 106 km^{2} (41 sq mi)
  - Rank: 192nd

Population (2025)
  - Total: 240,981
  - Rank: 79th
  - Density: 2,273/km^{2} (5,890/sq mi)

Ethnicity (2021)
  - Ethnic groups: List: 77.8% White; 12.6% Asian; 3.8% Mixed; 3.4% Black; 2.5% other

Religion (2021)
  - Religion: List: 48.4% Christianity; 33.1% no religion; 8.7% Islam; 2.0% Hinduism; 1.0% Judaism; 0.8% Sikhism; 0.4% Buddhism; 0.4% other; 5.1% not stated
- Time zone: UTC+0 (GMT)
  - Summer (DST): UTC+1 (BST)
- Postcode area: M; WA
- Dialling code: 0161
- ISO 3166 code: GB-TRF
- GSS code: E08000009
- Website: trafford.gov.uk

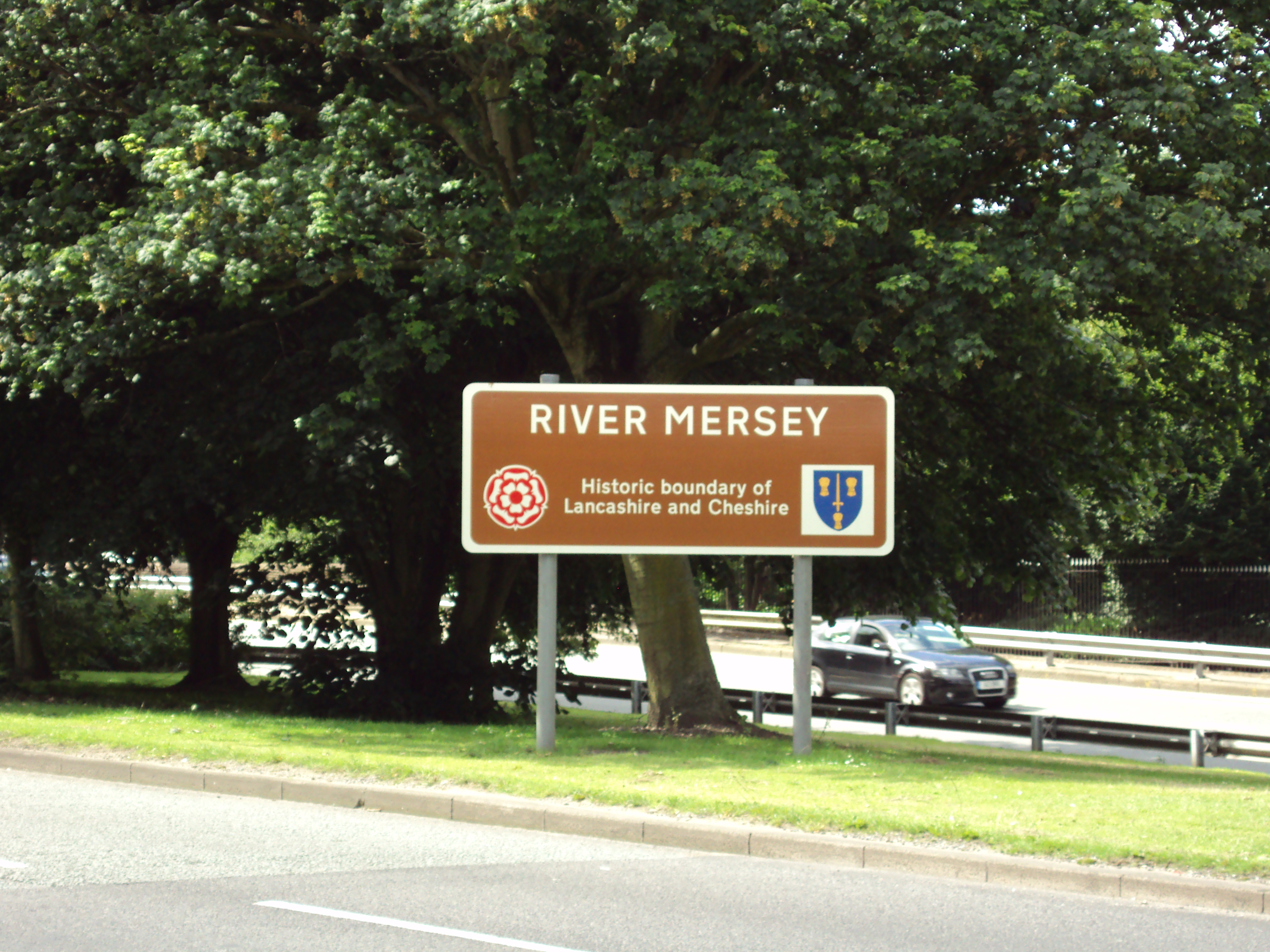
The boundary of the historic counties of Lancashire and Cheshire is marked along the River Mersey in Trafford.

Trafford is a metropolitan borough of Greater Manchester, England, with an estimated population of 240,981 in 2025. It covers 106 square kilometres (41 sq mi) and includes the towns of Altrincham, Stretford, Urmston, Partington and Sale. The borough was formed in 1974 as a merger of six former districts and part of a seventh. The River Mersey flows through the borough, separating North Trafford from South Trafford, and the historic counties of Lancashire and Cheshire. Trafford is the seventh-most populous district in Greater Manchester.

There is evidence of Neolithic, Bronze Age, and Roman activity in the area, two castles – one of them a Scheduled Ancient Monument – and over 200 listed buildings. In the late 19th century, the population rapidly expanded with the arrival of the railway. Trafford is the home of Manchester United F.C. and Lancashire County Cricket Club, as well as Altrincham F.C. and Trafford F.C. The Imperial War Museum North, opened in 2002, is located in the borough.

Trafford has a strong economy with low levels of unemployment and contains both Trafford Park industrial estate and the Trafford Centre, a large out-of-town shopping centre. Apart from the City of Manchester, Trafford is the only borough in Greater Manchester to be above the national average for weekly income. Socially, the area includes both working class and middle class areas like Bowdon and Hale. In Parliament, Trafford is represented by three constituencies: Stretford and Urmston; Altrincham and Sale West; and Wythenshawe and Sale East, which mainly covers neighbouring Manchester.

== History ==
The borough was formed on 1 April 1974 under the Local Government Act 1972, covering the area of six former districts which were abolished at the same time, as well as four civil parishes from a seventh abolished district:

- Altrincham Municipal Borough
- Bowdon Urban District
- Carrington‡
- Dunham Massey‡
- Hale Urban District
- Partington‡
- Sale Municipal Borough
- Stretford Municipal Borough
- Urmston Urban District
- Warburton‡

‡ Parishes from Bucklow Rural District

Stretford and Urmston had been in the administrative county of Lancashire before the 1974 reforms, whilst all the others had been in the administrative county of Cheshire. The new district was awarded borough status from its creation, allowing the chairman of the council to take the title of mayor.

The choice of the name Trafford for the borough was a compromise between Altrincham, Stretford and Sale. A Liberal councillor for the Municipal Borough of Sale suggested "Crossford ... whilst "Watlingford" was suggested by councillors in Hale, after the supposed name of an ancient Roman road in the district. Those names were rejected in favour of Trafford, because of the district's association with Old Trafford cricket and football grounds, Trafford Park and the de Trafford baronets.

Trafford is an Anglo-French version of Stratford, deriving from the Old English words stræt (street, more specifically a Roman road) and ford (crossing). The Metropolitan Borough of Trafford has existed since 1974, but the area it covers has a long history. Neolithic arrowheads have been discovered in Altrincham and Sale, and there is evidence of Bronze Age habitation in Timperley. Fragments of Roman pottery have been found in Urmston, and Roman coins have been found in Sale. The Roman road between the legionary fortresses at Chester (Deva Victrix) and York (Eboracum) crosses Trafford, passing through Stretford, Sale, and Altrincham. The settlements in Trafford have been based largely around agriculture, although Altrincham was founded as a market town in the mid 13th century. Although the Industrial Revolution affected Trafford, the area did not experience the same rate of growth as the rest of Greater Manchester. A 100% increase in population in the Trafford area between 1841 and 1861 was a direct result of an influx due to the construction of the Manchester, South Junction and Altrincham Railway, which allowed residents to commute more easily from Trafford into Manchester. The area developed its own centres of industry in Broadheath (founded in 1885) and Trafford Park (founded in 1897). They have since declined, although Trafford Park still employs 40–50,000 people. Today, Trafford is mostly a commuter area. The borough was formed on 1 April 1974 by the Local Government Act 1972 as one of the ten metropolitan districts of Greater Manchester.

== Geography ==
The metropolitan boroughs of the City of Salford and the City of Manchester border Trafford to the north and east respectively; the Cheshire East area of Cheshire lies to the south. The geology of South Trafford is Keuper marl with some Keuper waterstone and sandstone, whilst the geology of North Trafford is Bunter sandstone. The River Mersey runs east to west through the area, separating North Trafford from South Trafford; other rivers in Trafford include the Bollin, the River Irwell, Sinderland Brook, and Crofts Bank Brook. The Bridgewater Canal, opened in 1761 and completed in 1776, follows a course through Trafford roughly north to south and passes through Stretford, Sale, and Altrincham. The Manchester Ship Canal, opened in 1894, forms part of Trafford's northern and western boundaries with Salford.

Trafford is generally flat, with most of the land lying between 66 feet (20 m) and 98 feet (30 m) above sea level, apart from Bowdon Hill in South Trafford which rises 200 feet (60 m) above sea level. The lowest point in Trafford, near Warburton, is 36 feet (11 m) above sea level. There are areas of mossland in low-lying areas: Warburton Moss, Dunham Moss, and Hale Moss. Greenspace accounts for 51.8% of Trafford's total area, domestic buildings and gardens comprise 25.6%, the rest is made up of roads and non-domestic buildings.

Localities within the boundaries of Trafford include:

North Trafford: Cornbrook, Davyhulme, Firswood, Flixton, Gorse Hill, Lostock, Old Trafford, Stretford, Trafford Park and Urmston.

South Trafford: Altrincham, Ashton-Upon-Mersey, Bowdon, Broadheath, Brooklands, Carrington, Dunham Massey, Hale, Hale Barns, Oldfield Brow, Partington, Sale, Sale Moor, Timperley, Warburton and West Timperley.

== Governance ==
=== Representation ===
The residents of Trafford Metropolitan Borough are represented in the British Parliament by Members of Parliament (MPs) for three separate parliamentary constituencies. Altrincham and Sale West is represented by Connor Rand MP (Labour). Stretford and Urmston is represented by Andrew Western MP (Labour). Wythenshawe and Sale East, which also covers parts of the City of Manchester, is represented by Mike Kane MP (Labour).

=== Council ===
In 1974, Trafford Council was created to administer the newly formed Trafford Metropolitan Borough and is headquartered at Trafford Town Hall, which was previously named Stretford Town Hall. On its formation in 1974, the council was controlled by the Conservative Party; the Conservatives have been in control 1973–85, 1988–94, and 2004–2018. The only time the Labour Party was in control was 1996–2002, and 2019 to the present. The rest of the time were periods of no overall control. The council meets to decide policy and allocate budget. Its duties include setting levels of council tax, monitoring the health service in Trafford, providing social care, and funding schools. Cllr Tom Ross is the leader of the council and Cllr Amy Whyte is the current mayor.

In 2007 the Audit Commission judged Trafford Council to be "improving strongly" in providing services for local people. Overall the council was awarded "three star" status meaning it was "performing well" and "consistently above minimum requirements", similar to 46% of all local authorities. In 2008–09, Trafford council had a budget of £150.5 million. This was collected from council tax (57%) and government grants (43%). The council spent £31.8 million on children and young people's services (21%); £60.1 million on community services and social care (40%); £34.4 million on "prosperity, planning, and development" (23%); and £33.8 million on customer and corporate services (22%).

Civil parishes form the bottom tier of local government; the parish councils are involved in planning, management of town and parish centres, and promoting tourism. In 2001, 8,484 people (4.0% of the borough's population) lived in Trafford's four civil parishes: Carrington, Dunham Massey, Partington, and Warburton. They were all previously part of Bucklow Rural District. A rural district was a type of local government district for the administration of predominantly rural areas. The rest of Trafford is unparished. The unparished areas are: Altrincham (Municipal Borough), Bowdon (Urban District), Hale (Urban District), Sale (Municipal Borough), Stretford (Municipal Borough), and Urmston (Urban District). The status of each area prior to 1974 is shown in brackets. An urban district was a type of local government district which covered an urbanised area.

Following the 2018 local elections, the council, which was previously Conservative-held, came under Labour control in the form of a minority administration supported by the Liberal Democrats in a confidence and supply administration. There were a few shock results, such as in Altrincham (ward), where the Green Party gained seats from the incumbent Conservative councillors. After gaining seats in the 2019 local elections, the Labour Party was in a position to form a majority-controlling administration.

Party political make-up of Trafford Council
Party	Seats								
Party	2015	2016	2017	2018	2019	2021	2022	2023	2024
Labour	26	25	26	30	36	40	41	41	43
Conservative	34	35	33	29	20	17	13	10	8
Liberal Democrats	3	3	3	2	4	3	5	6	6
Green	0	0	0	2	3	3	4	6	6

==== Electoral wards ====
There are 21 electoral wards in Trafford, each with 3 councillors, giving a total of 63 councillors with one-third elected three years out of four. In the following table, which lists the wards before the boundary changes of 2023, the populations for each ward are based on 2013 population estimates from the Office for National Statistics.

Ward name	Localities covered (approximate)	Population	Ref.
Altrincham	Altrincham, Broadheath, and Oldfield Brow	11,873	
Ashton upon Mersey	Ashton upon Mersey and Sale	9,726	
Bowdon	Altrincham, Bowdon, Dunham Massey, and Warburton	9,284	
Broadheath	Altrincham, Broadheath, Sale, Timperley, and West Timperley	13,069	
Brooklands	Brooklands and Sale	10,572	
Bucklow-St. Martins	Ashton upon Mersey, Carrington, and Partington	10,540	
Clifford	Old Trafford	12,003	
Davyhulme East	Davyhulme, The Trafford Centre and Urmston	9,680	
Davyhulme West	Davyhulme and Flixton	10,006	
Flixton	Flixton	10,828	
Gorse Hill	Gorse Hill, Stretford and Trafford Park	12,171	
Hale Barns	Hale, Hale Barns and Timperley	9,812	
Hale Central	Altrincham and Hale	10,543	
Longford	Firswood, Old Trafford, and Stretford	12,163	
Priory	Sale	10,917	
Sale Moor	Sale and Sale Moor	10,508	
St. Mary's	Ashton upon Mersey and Sale	11,795	
Stretford	Stretford	11,318	
Timperley	Brooklands and Timperley	11,201	
Urmston	Flixton and Urmston	11,271	
Village	Brooklands and Timperley	10,899	

==== Coat of arms ====
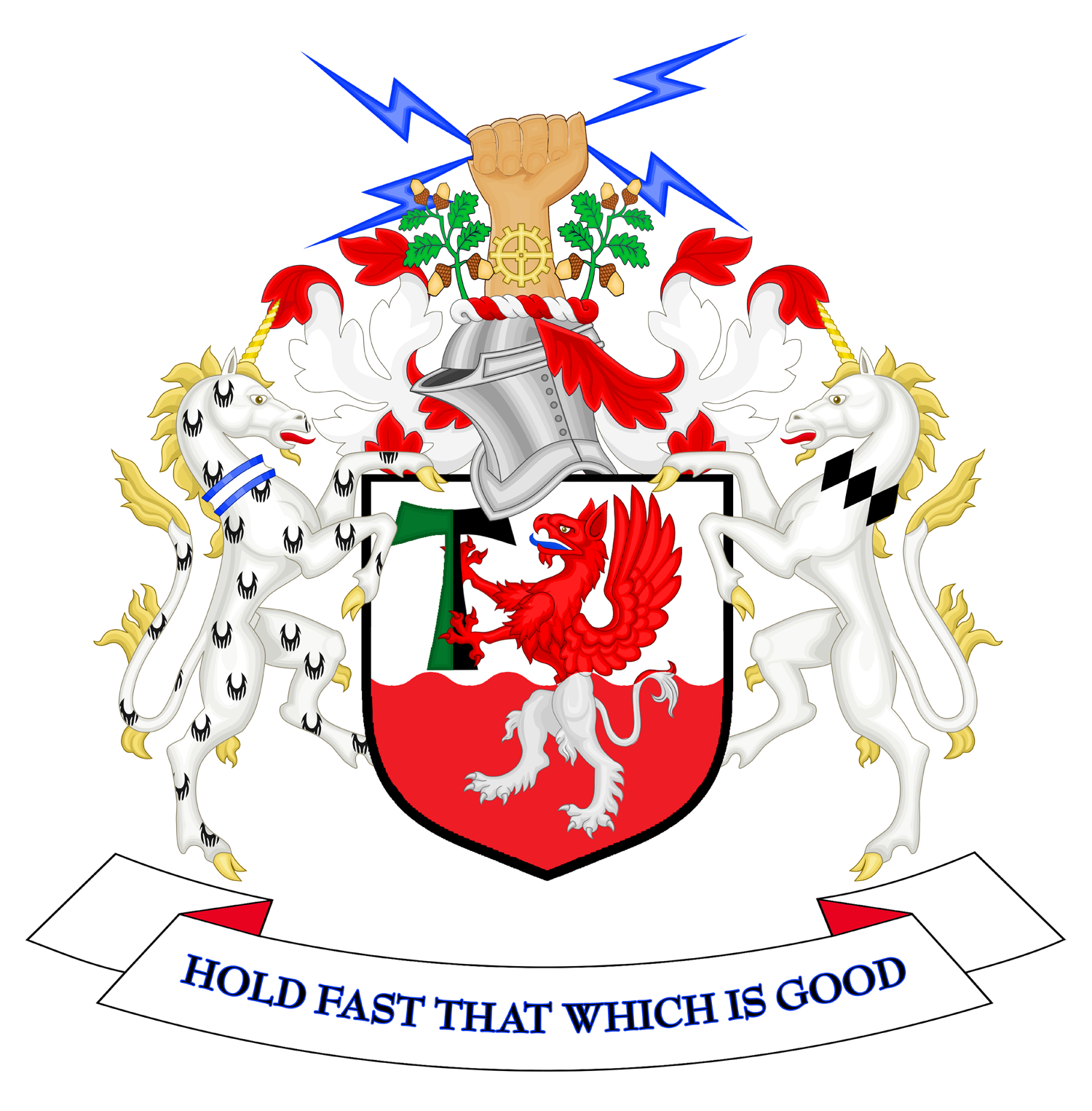
The coat of arms of Trafford Metropolitan Borough Council

The coat of arms of Trafford Council depicts a griffin on a shield flanked by two unicorns. The line bisecting the shield horizontally symbolises the River Mersey running through Trafford from east to west and the canals in the borough. The white legs of a lion on a red background represent the parts of Trafford previously controlled by the De Massey family, while the red body and head of an eagle on a white background represents the areas of Trafford previously controlled by the De Traffords. Both elements were taken from the coats of arms of the respective families. The fist holding bolts of lightning represents Stretford and the electrical industry; the cog on the arm represents Altrincham's engineering industry. The unicorns stand for Sale and Altrincham. The oak branches represent Urmston and the rural areas of Trafford.

== Demography ==
Ethnic groups in Trafford
Ethnic Group	Year	
Ethnic Group	2021	
Ethnic Group	Number	%
White: Total	182,761	77.8
White: British	169,550	72.1
White: Irish	4,884	2.1
White: Roma	134	0.1
White: Gypsy or Irish Traveller	46	<0.1
White: Other	8,147	3.5
Asian or Asian British: Total	29,588	12.5
Asian or Asian British: Indian	10,208	4.3
Asian or Asian British: Pakistani	11,479	4.9
Asian or Asian British: Bangladeshi	634	0.3
Asian or Asian British: Chinese	4,813	2.0
Asian or Asian British: Other Asian	2,454	1.0
Black or Black British: Total	8,086	3.4
Black or Black British: African	3,636	1.5
Black or Black British: Caribbean	3,442	1.5
Other Black	1,008	0.4
Mixed or British Mixed: Total	8,834	3.7
Mixed: White and Black Caribbean	3,091	1.3
Mixed: White and Black African	1,068	0.5
Mixed: White and Asian	2,443	1.0
Mixed: Other Mixed	2,232	0.9
Other: Total	5,784	2.4
Other: Arab	2,457	1.0
Other: Any other ethnic group	3,327	1.4
Total	235,052	100%

Religion affiliation in Trafford
Religion	2021	
Religion	Number	%
Christian	113,712	48.4
Muslim	20,549	8.7
Jewish	2,408	1.0
Hindu	4,656	2.0
Sikh	1,984	0.8
Buddhism	955	0.4
Other religion	920	0.4
No religion	77,864	33.1
Religion not stated	12,007	5.1
Total	235,052	100.0

At the 2001 UK census, the Metropolitan Borough of Trafford had a total population of 210,145. Of the 89,313 households in the borough, 36.5% were married couples living together, 31.6% were one-person households, 7.8% were co-habiting couples and 9.7% were lone parents, following a similar trend to the rest of England.

The population density was 1,982/km^{2} (5,130/sq mi) and for every 100 females, there were 94.6 males. Of those aged 16–74 in Trafford, 24.7% had no academic qualifications, significantly lower than the 28.9% in all of England. 8.2% of Trafford's residents were born outside the United Kingdom, lower than the English average of 9.2%. The largest minority group was Asian, at 4.0% of the population.

In 1841, 12% of Trafford's population was middle class compared to 14% in England and Wales; this increased to 21% in 1931 (15% nationally) and 55% in 2001 (48% nationally). From 1841 to 1951, the working class population of Trafford and across the country was in decline, falling steadily from 43% to 18% (36% to 29% nationally). It has since increased to 27% (26% nationwide). The rest of the population was made up of clerical workers and skilled manual workers. In the 2008–2009 financial year, the crime rates in Trafford for violence against a person and sexual offences were below the national averages. However, the rate of robberies and burglaries were above the national average.

=== Population change ===
The table below details the population change since 1801. Although Trafford was formed as a Metropolitan Borough in 1974, figures have been generated by combining data from the towns, villages, and civil parishes that would later be constituent parts of Trafford. The greatest percentage change in the population occurred between 1851 and 1871, and was a result of the construction of the Manchester, South Junction and Altrincham Railway in 1849. The decrease in Trafford's population between 1971 and 2001 mirrors the trend for Greater Manchester, although on a smaller scale; this has been accounted for by the decline of Greater Manchester's industries, particularly those in Manchester and Salford but including those in Trafford, and residents leaving to seek new jobs.

Population in Trafford since 1801
Year	1801	1811	1821	1831	1841	1851	1861	1881	1891	
Population	10,337	11,798	13,409	14,562	16,629	19,286	23,506	64,363	77,535	
Year	1911	1921	1931	1951	1961	1971	1981	1991	2001	2011
Population	116,538	125,891	153,731	201,784	224,938	225,939	222,124	214,618	210,134	226,578
Source: A Vision of Britain through Time

== Economy ==
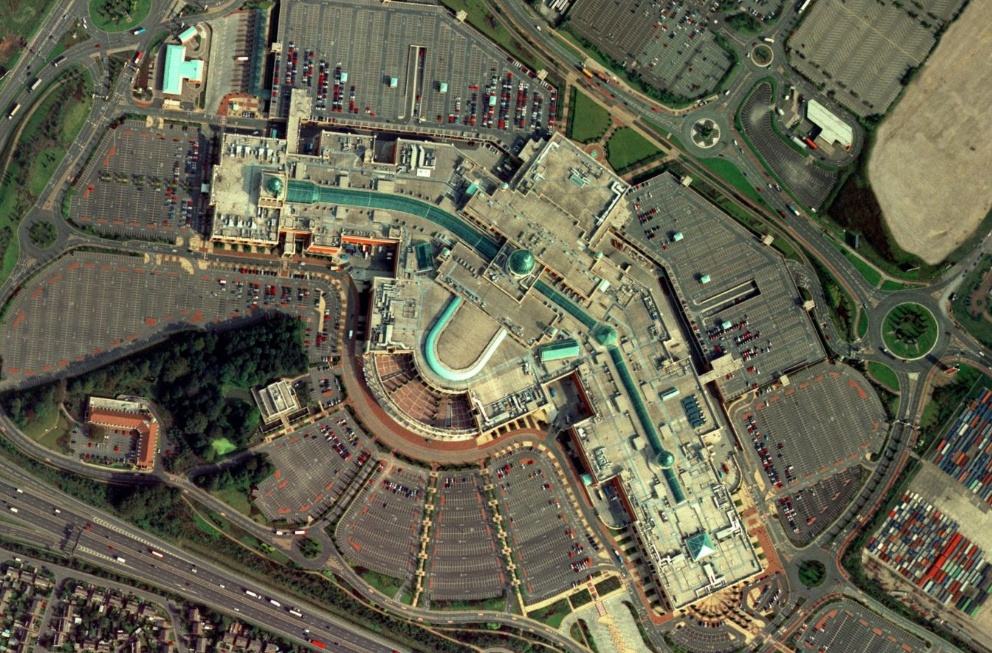
Aerial view of the Trafford Centre

Historically, the economy of the Trafford was dominated by agriculture. This continued during the Industrial Revolution because the textile industry in Trafford did not develop as much as it did in the rest of Greater Manchester. There are only two known 18th-century mill sites in Trafford, compared with 69 known in Tameside and 51 in Manchester. After reaching a high of 43% in 1812, employment in the textile industry in Trafford declined to 12% according to the 1851 census. The textile industry in Trafford could not compete with that in places such as Manchester, Oldham, and Ashton-under-Lyne, partly because of a reluctance to invest in industry on the part of the two main land owners in the area: the Stamfords and the de Traffords.

Trafford Park was founded in 1897, and at its peak in 1945 employed 75,000 people. As well as being the world's first planned industrial estate, it is Europe's largest business park. More than 1,400 companies are within the park, employing between 40,000 and 50,000 people. The Trafford Centre, which opened on 10 September 1998, is North West England's largest indoor shopping complex. The centre has over 30 million visitors annually, and contains 235 stores, 55 restaurants, and the largest Odeon cinema in the UK.

Trafford compared
2001 UK Census	Trafford	Greater Manchester	England
Population of working age	151,445	1,805,315	35,532,091
Full-time employment	43.4%	40.3%	40.8%
Part-time employment	11.9%	11.3%	11.8%
Self-employed	8.0%	6.7%	8.3%
Unemployed	2.7%	3.5%	3.3%
Retired	13.9%	13.0%	13.5%

Trafford is a prosperous area, with an average weekly income of £394, and apart from Manchester it is the only borough in Greater Manchester to be above the national average for weekly income and is on average the highest in the county. Media, advertising and public relations have been identified as growth industries in Greater Manchester and are concentrated in Manchester and Trafford. Average house prices in Trafford are the highest out of all the metropolitan boroughs in Greater Manchester, 45% higher than the average for the county.

At the 2001 UK census, Trafford had 151,445 residents aged 16 to 74. 2.5% of these people were students with jobs, 5.7% looking after home or family, 5.4% permanently sick or disabled and 2.8% economically inactive for other reasons. Trafford has a low rate of unemployment (2.7%) compared with Greater Manchester (3.6%) and England as a whole (3.3%). Trafford has the lowest number of unemployment benefit claimants compared to all the other boroughs in Greater Manchester (3.7%).

In 2001, of 99,146 residents of Trafford in employment, the industry of employment was 17.1% property and business services, 16.5% retail and wholesale, 12.3% manufacturing, 11.9% health and social work, 8.2% education, 8.0% transport and communications, 5.9% construction, 5.5% finance, 4.5% public administration and defence, 4.0% hotels and restaurants, 0.8% energy and water supply, 0.6% agriculture, and 4.6% other. This was roughly in line with national figures, except for the proportion of jobs in agriculture which is less than half the national average, reflecting Trafford's suburban nature and its proximity to the centre of Manchester.

A study commissioned by Experian rated Trafford as the strongest and most resilient borough in North West England to dealing with sudden changes in the economy. Trafford's low reliance on vulnerable businesses in the current recession and its high proportion of multinational companies were two factors which give the borough its high ranking.

== Culture ==
=== Landmarks ===
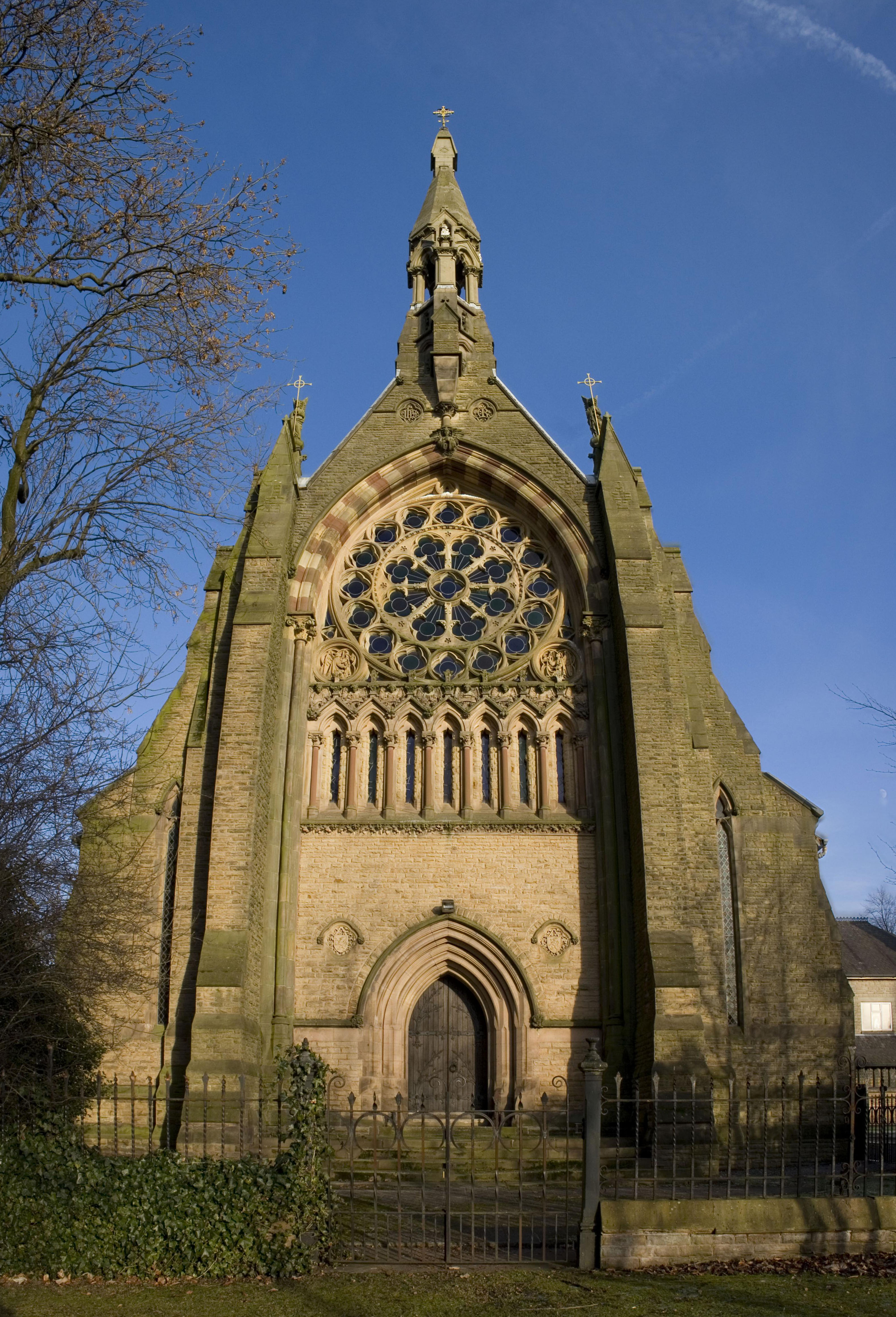
The Church of All Saints, Urmston, is a Grade I listed building.

As of March 2007, Trafford has 6 Grade I, 11 Grade II*, and 228 Grade II listed buildings. Trafford has the equal second highest number of Grade I listed buildings out of the districts of Greater Manchester behind Manchester. Most of Trafford's Grade I listed buildings are in the south of the borough: the old Church of St. Werburgh in Warburton; Dunham Massey Hall itself, and the stables and carriage house belonging to the hall; Royd House in Hale; and the Church of All Saints in Urmston in the north of the borough. Trafford has three of Greater Manchester's 21 Sites of Special Scientific Interest. Brookheys Covert is a semi-natural wood consisting mainly of ash, birch, and rowan, with a wetland habitat covering 5.8 acres (2.3 ha) in Dunham Massey. Cotteril Clough is an area of woodland that is among the most diverse in Greater Manchester. Dunham Park is an area of "pasture-woodland or park-woodland" and has been since the Middle Ages, including many oak trees that date back to the 17th century, and covers 192.7 acres (78.0 ha). Also in Trafford are many parks and open spaces; there are 21.2 square miles (55 km^{2}) of greenspace, 51.8% of the total area covered by the borough. Tourist attractions in Trafford include Old Trafford football ground and Old Trafford Cricket Ground.

Chill Factor^{e} is an indoor ski slope in Trafford Park. It features the UK's longest and widest real snow indoor slope, 100 metres (110 yd) wide and 180 metres (200 yd) long.

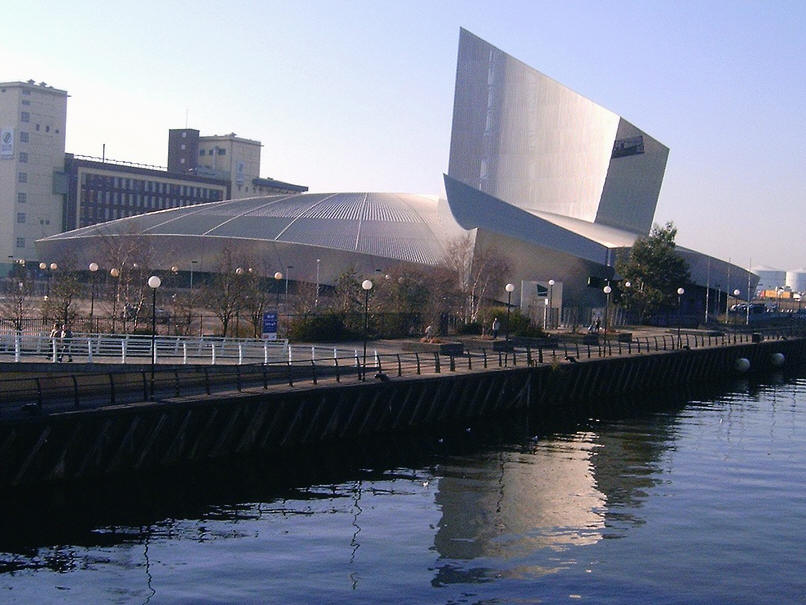
The Imperial War Museum North in Trafford Park

Dunham Massey Hall and Park is an 18th-century hall with a 250-acre (1.0 km^{2}) deer park, both now owned by the National Trust and previously owned by the Earls of Stamford. The hall is early Georgian in style. The hall and grounds are open to the public and are a popular tourist attraction, with nearly 200,000 visitors in 2010.

Imperial War Museum North is a war museum in Trafford Park and was opened in 2002. The museum won the 2003 British Construction Industry Building Award, and the title of Large Visitor Attraction of the Year at the 2006 Manchester Tourism Awards.

Sale Water Park is a 152-acre (62 ha) area of countryside and parkland including a 52-acre (21 ha) artificial lake created when the M60 motorway was built. The water park is the site of the Broad Ees Dole wildlife refuge, a Local Nature Reserve that provides a home for migratory birds.

Timperley Old Hall is a medieval moated site in Timperley near Altrincham Municipal Golf Course. Excavation on the site over a period of 18 years has shown Timperley to be inhabited since the Bronze Age. A grant from the Heritage Lottery Fund has been made to develop the site into a community project.

Trafford has two medieval castles. Dunham Castle is an early medieval castle in Dunham Massey. It belonged to Hamon de Massey, and was probably still standing in the early 14th century. The bailey was landscaped into the grounds of Dunham Massey Hall and its moat turned into an ornamental pond. Watch Hill Castle is an early medieval motte-and-bailey castle on the border of Dunham Massey and Bowdon. It is listed as a Scheduled Ancient Monument. The motte and surrounding ditch still survives, although it had fallen out of use by the 13th century.

=== Sport ===
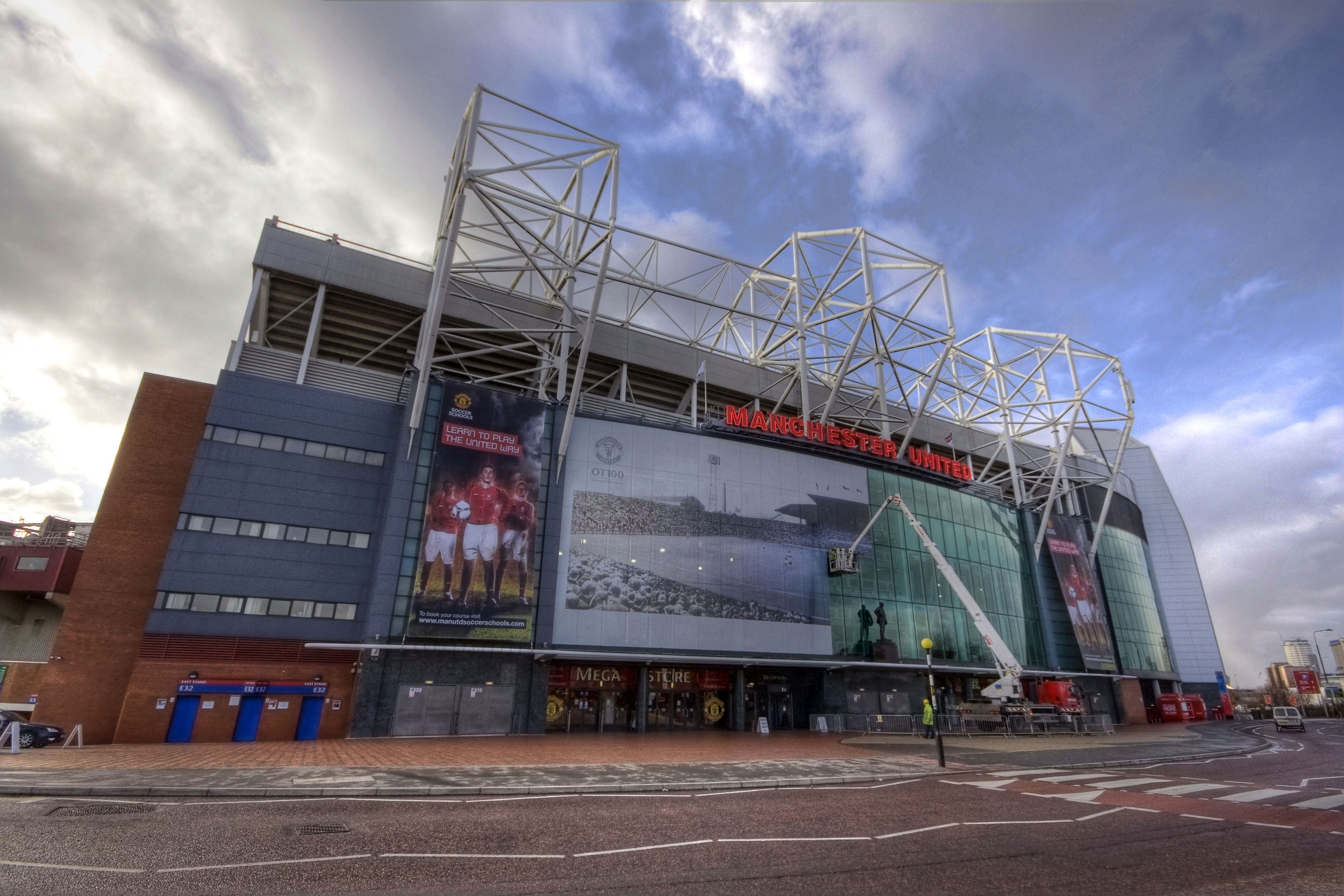
The East Stand of Old Trafford football ground

Trafford is the home of several major sports teams, including Manchester United Football Club and Lancashire County Cricket Club (LCCC). Manchester United began as Newton Heath L&YR F.C. in 1878. The team plays at Old Trafford football ground, which is sometimes used as a stadium for major football matches like the 2003 UEFA Champions League final. Manchester United have won the FA Cup 13 times and been the Premier League champions 13 times (since the league was formed 31 seasons ago) and were Football League champions seven times in the years prior to that. The club last won the Premier League in 2013. LCCC started as the Manchester Cricket Club, and represents the historic county of Lancashire. The club contested the original 1890 County Championship. Old Trafford Cricket Ground – Lancashire's home ground – stages international matches, including Test matches and One Day Internationals. The team has won the county championship eight times outright (with one shared) and were the county champions in 2011 – the county's first outright triumph since 1934, but were then relegated to the second division in 2012.

From 2006 until 2015, the borough was home to the Manchester Phoenix, who played their home games at the Altrincham Ice Dome, and were active in both the Elite Ice Hockey League and the English Premier Ice Hockey League. The club was formed in 2003 as the successor to Manchester Storm, and folded in early 2017 after playing home fixtures during 2015–2016 in Deeside and Blackpool. They were one of the founder members of the Elite Ice Hockey League. In 2008–09 they finished sixth in the Elite Ice Hockey League. The Trafford Metros were the Phoenix's junior side and are also based at the Altrincham Ice Dome. The Phoenix were replaced by a new team bearing the Manchester Storm name, who took a spot in the Elite Ice Hockey League for the 2015–2016 season

Rugby Union side Sale Sharks were formerly based in Trafford. They now play at the Salford Community Stadium in Salford, although their former home ground at Heywood Road in Sale is still used for training. Sale Sharks won the Guinness Premiership in 2006; in 2008–09 they finished fifth.

As well as being home to several clubs in the top echelon of their sports, Trafford plays host to smaller clubs, including Altrincham F.C., Flixton F.C., and Trafford F.C. Both Flixton F.C. and Trafford F.C. play in the North West Counties Football League Division One. Flixton F.C. was formed in 1960 and earned promotion to NWCFL Division One at the end of the 2006–07 season. Trafford F.C. was formed in 1990 and finished fifth in the 2006–07 season. Altrincham F.C. was founded in 1903 and plays in the Football Conference.

Within Trafford their two clubs that enter teams in both the Men's and Women's England Hockey Leagues – Brooklands, based in Sale and Bowdon.

In 2017, Trafford Pétanque became Trafford's first ever officially registered Pétanque club. Trafford Pétanque currently plays within the Northern Region of Pétanque England.

== Education ==
There are 73 primary schools in Trafford, 17 secondary and grammar schools, and 6 special schools. Trafford maintains a selective education system, with grammar schools, assessed by the 11-plus exam. Trafford College, a £29M "super college" in Stretford, is the only college of further education in Trafford. It was officially opened in 2008, following a merger between South Trafford College and North Trafford College. Overall, Trafford was ranked 2nd out of all of the local education authorities in National Curriculum assessment performance in 2014. Indeed, in 2014 Trafford was the first in the United Kingdom for Key Stage 2 results, with 87% of Year 6 pupils achieving the expected standard of Level 4 or above in Reading, Writing and Arithmetic. Also in 2014 2nd for both GCSE and A-Level results, with 72.2% of Year 11 pupils achieving the expected standard or above of 5 GCSEs including English and Maths. For A-Level results 25% of students gained 3 A-Levels at grades A*-A, which is twice the national average, whilst 33% gained 3 A-levels at grades A*-B.

Trafford has 7 Grammar schools and all 7 are in the top 10 best performing state schools in Greater Manchester.

== Religion ==
Religion in Trafford
2001 UK Census	Trafford	North West England	England
Population	210,145	6,729,764	49,138,831
Christian	75.8%	78.0%	71.7%
Muslim	3.3%	3.0%	3.1%
Jewish	1.1%	0.4%	0.5%
No religion	12.0%	10.5%	14.6%

At the 2001 UK census, 75.8% of Trafford's residents reported themselves as being Christian, 3.3% Muslim, 1.1% Jewish, 0.6% Hindu, 0.2% Buddhist and 0.5% Sikh. The census recorded 12.0% as having no religion, 0.2% had an alternative religion and 6.4% did not state their religion. Trafford is covered by the Catholic Dioceses of Shrewsbury and Salford, and the Church of England Dioceses of Manchester and Chester.

There are two Grade I listed churches in Trafford: St Werburgh's Church in Warburton, a timber-framed building dating back to at least the 14th century; and All Saints' Church in Urmston, constructed in 1868 by E. W. Pugin and considered to be one of his finest works. Of the eleven Grade II* listed buildings in Trafford, seven are churches: Hale Chapel in Hale; the Church of St John the Divine in Sale; the Church of St Mary the Virgin in Bowdon; St Martin's Church in Sale; St Michael's Church in Flixton; St Margaret's Church in Altrincham; and St George's Church in Carrington.

In 2007 the Church of Scientology bought the Old Trafford Essence Distillery on Chester Road for a reported £3.6 million. The church stated that it had plans to turn the 51,000-square-foot (4,700 m^{2}) Victorian building into a place of worship and religious instruction. The original plans were rejected by Trafford Council, but the church stated its intention to revise the proposals and resubmit.

== Transport ==
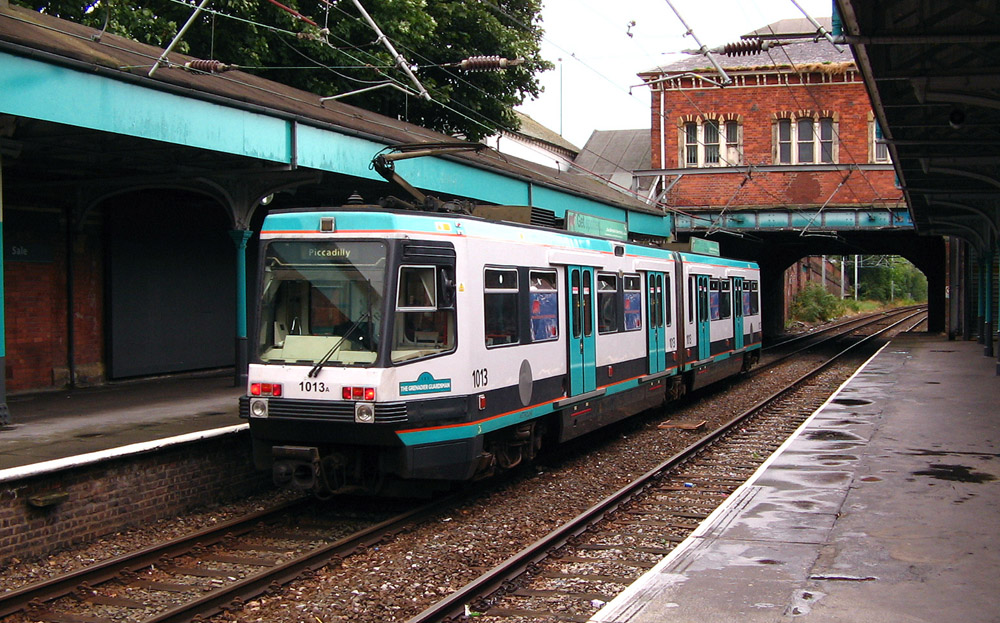
Sale tram stop

Manchester Metrolink runs north–south through Trafford, with its southern terminus in Altrincham. Trams run on two routes: Altrincham to Piccadilly and Altrincham to Bury. It serves Cornbrook, Trafford Bar, Old Trafford, Stretford, Dane Road, Sale, Brooklands, Timperley, Navigation Road and Altrincham. The line opened in 1992 and replaced the Manchester, South Junction and Altrincham Railway.

The other railway in Trafford is the Liverpool – Manchester via Warrington Central line, built by the Cheshire Lines Committee. The 20-acre (8 ha) Trafford Park Euroterminal rail freight terminal was opened in 1993. It cost £11 million and has the capacity to deal with 100,000 containers a year.

The council is responsible for the maintenance of Trafford's public roads and pavements. Part of the M60 orbital motorway passes through Trafford, from junctions 6–10 inclusive.

A range of bus services provide connections between various towns in the borough and links to the city centre, and other urban areas of Greater Manchester and Cheshire. Operators include Stagecoach Manchester, Arriva North West, First Greater Manchester and some smaller operators, who generally run services under contract to Transport for Greater Manchester. Trafford Cycle Forum was established to promote cycling in Trafford; the group actively campaigns to raise money for cycling in the borough.

== Freedom of the Borough ==
Sir Alex Ferguson and 207 (Manchester) Field Hospital, 2nd Medical Brigade, Royal Army Medical Corps (Army Reserve) received the Freedom of the Borough of Trafford on 14 October 2013 and 21 June 2011, respectively.
