= British Bangladeshi Power & Inspiration 100 =

- Author: Abdal Ullah; Ayesha Qureshi
- Language: English
- Series: 1st Edition (2012); 2nd Edition (2013); 3rd Edition (2014); 4th Edition (2015); 5th Edition (2016)
- Subject: Biographical dictionary
- Genre: Non-fiction
- Publication date: 24 January 2012
- Publication place: United Kingdom
- Media type: Online

British Bangladeshi Power & Inspiration 100 (previously known as British Bangladeshi Power 100 and often abbreviated as BBPower100) is an annual publication listing the 100 leading British Bangladeshi figures. It was established in 2012 and also holds an annual launch ceremony in London, England.

== Overview ==
The British Bangladeshi Power 100 is a celebration of leading British citizens of Bangladesh origin who are helping shape Britain for the better with their ideas, example, talent, success and inspiration. It is a who's who, which recognises the achievements in the Bangladeshi community including sports personalities, politicians, business people and legal eagles. In 2013, the list was renamed British Bangladeshi Power & Inspiration 100 to emphasise the role models featured on the list.

== Panel ==
The British Bangladeshi Power was created and edited by Tower Hamlets Cllr Abdal Ullah, who was the first British Bangladeshi to serve on the Metropolitan Police Authority and is a Labour elected councillor for St Dunstan's and Stepney Green, and Ayesha Qureshi MBE, who worked on the 2012 Olympics bid.

== Categories ==
Each category has 10 positions which are listed in rank order. The rankings have been determined by an advisory committee of leading Bangladeshi UK based newspaper editors headed by chief advisor, Mohammed Nobab Uddin, Editor, Janomot Bengali Newsweekly, the oldest ethnic newspaper. The British Bangladeshi Power 100 is consulted on widely amongst a selected group of leading figures in the community, including Iqbal Wahhab OBE and Syed Nahas Pasha. Each person or organisation named on the list has earned their place on merit after a confidential, impartial and thorough debate.

In 2012, the list was broken down into 10 different categories covering business, catering, education, community and voluntary organisations, media, politics and as well as the women who have made a mark. In 2013, the list was extended into 20 different categories including politics, entrepreneur, brand, policy/civil service, legal, academic/think tanker, medical, the city/finance, community activist, media, culture, community personality, restaurateur, professional, networks and associations, sport, religious figure, 30 and under, community organisation, and emerging influence. 35 new entries were added into the list. All those categorised under "Emerging Influence" were new inclusions and there were no new entries into the category "Entrepreneur" and "Restaurateur".

In 2014, for first time, the general public participated in the selection process by nominating their most inspiring figures in British Bangladeshi society. The Judges awarded the People's Choice places to five people who demonstrated examples of success and inspiration. Also in 2014, the list includes "10 Inspirational Bangladeshis Around The World", a top ten of Bangladeshis around the world.

In 2015, two new categories – the Critics' Choice and Westminster Hopefuls – highlighting British Bangladeshi individuals who have been selected as prospective parliamentary candidates for the next general election, were introduced.

== Past events ==
Original logo

On 24 January 2012, during a press conference at Portcullis House in Westminster, London Abdal Ullah, Ayesha Qureshi MBE and Nobab Uddin launched the first British Bangladeshi Power 100 list.

On 27 January 2013, the advisory committee announced the names for the list at a press conference held at the Commonwealth Room in the House of Commons. Guests at the reception included: Theresa May MP, Chuka Umunna MP, Rushanara Ali MP, Stephen Timms MP, John Biggs AM and Simon Hughes MP. The event was hosted by Anne Main MP.

On 27 January 2014, the list was announced in a Commonwealth Room at the Houses of Parliament. The top 100 names were announced by figures including Baroness Sayeeda Warsi, Rt. Hon Danny Alexander MP, Anne Main MP (Chair of the All Party Parliamentary Bangladesh Group), Dame Tessa Jowell MP, Lord Karan Bilimoria, Mijarul Quayes Bangladesh High Commissioner to the UK and a number of other MPs and dignitaries were in attendance.

On 27 January 2015, former foreign secretary William Hague MP was guest of honour, joined by MPs Dame Tessa Jowell and Alan Johnson at a celebration dinner marking the launch of the list in One Canada Square, Canary Wharf. On 3 February, the list was launched in Dhaka, Bangladesh.

On 2 February 2016, notable guests included British politicians Lord Karan Bilimoria, Paul Scully MP, Anne Main MP, Karen Buck MP, Sir Keir Starmer MP, Ronnie Campbell MP, Greater London Authority Member Murad Qureshi and Bangladesh High Commissioner Mohammed Abdul Hannan at the ceremony at London's City Hall. Among the most influential in the list are British Ambassador to Peru Anwar Choudhury Ambassador to Philippines Asif Ahmad, Musician Shapla Salique, Choreographer Akram Khan, Nohshad Shah, MD of Goldman Sachs, Professor Moorad Choudhry, Chief Executive of Habib Bank AG Zurich, Businessmen Iqbal Ahmed OBE, Amin Ali and in Politics three MP's Rushanara Ali, Tulip Siddiq and Rupa Huq.

== Notable entries ==
Notable entries in the British Bangladeshi Power 100 have included Ruby Hammer MBE, who started off as a make-up artist and went on to become a successful entrepreneur, Iqbal Ahmed OBE (Chairman of the Seamark Group), Sapnara Khatun (barrister and judge), Asif Anwar Ahmad (Ambassador to Thailand), Prof Moorad Choudhry (Treasurer RBS), Mihir Bose (sports journalist), Shadow Education Minister Rushanara Ali, Prospective Parliamentary candidate Tulip Siddiq, and former British High Commissioner to Bangladesh Anwar Choudhury.

Media personalities have included Nina Hossain, Konnie Huq and Tasmin Lucia-Khan. Other notable entries include British kickboxing champion Ruqsana Begum and singer Mumzy Stranger.

In 2013, the list included emerging faces such as Sabirul Islam (the "Teen-Trepreneur") and Zoe Rahman. In 2014, the list also contained less well-known and emerging faces such as Rupa Huq (Labour Prospective Parliamentary Candidate for Ealing at the time and current MP) and Zubair Hoque, Formula 4 Racing Driver.

In 2013, the list also recognised the contribution made by British Bangladeshis to the London 2012 Olympic and Paralympic Games including names such as Akram Khan MBE (choreographer and performer at the Olympic Games opening ceremony), Dr Muhammad Abdul Bari (LOCOG board member and Chairman of the East London Mosque), and Saiman Miah (Olympic £5 coin designer)

In 2014, Nobel laureate and Grameen Bank founder Dr Muhammad Yunus ranked top of "10 Inspirational Bangladeshis Around The World". Among others, the list also included YouTube founder Jawed Karim, Brac's founder and chairperson Sir Fazle Hasan Abed, founder of Khan Academy Salman Khan, JAAGO Foundation's founder Korvi Rakshand, lawyer Sara Hossain, cricketer Shakib Al Hasan, and founder of Sumazi.com Sumaya Kazi.

In 2015, Judge Khatun Sapnara was named the "Person of the Year" in recognition of her "outstanding achievement" as the first person of British Bangladeshi origin to acquire a senior judicial position. The list also included oncologist Prof Nazneen Rahman; Dr Irene Zubaida Khan, chancellor of the University of Salford, and author Tahmima Anam.

In 2016, Nadiya Hussain, was named the "Person of the Year" for pioneering achievement.

== See also ==
- British Bangladeshi Who's Who
- British Bangladeshi
- List of British Bangladeshis
- Top 100 (disambiguation)
- Who's Who
