= Hale, Greater Manchester =

Village in Greater Manchester, England

Coordinates: 53.377°N 2.347°W

Hale
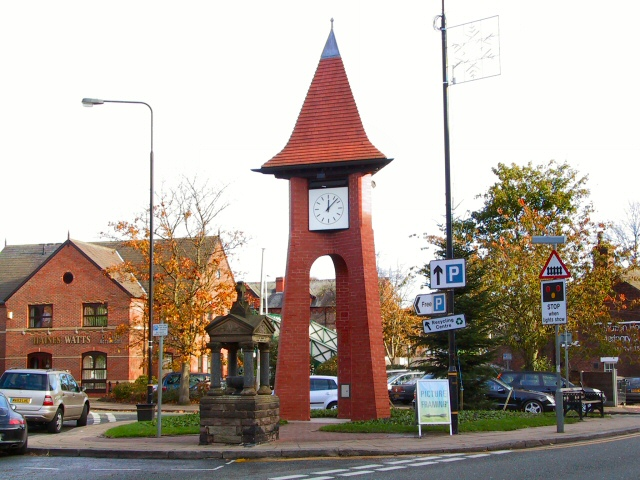
- Hale Millennium clock tower in 2008

- Location within Greater Manchester
- Population: 16,715 (Built up area, 2021 census)
- OS grid reference: SJ769867
- Metropolitan borough: Trafford
- Metropolitan county: Greater Manchester
- Region: North West
- Country: England
- Sovereign state: United Kingdom
- Post town: Altrincham
- Postcode district: WA15
- Dialling code: 0161
- Police: Greater Manchester
- Fire: Greater Manchester
- Ambulance: North West
- UK Parliament: Altrincham and Sale

Hale is a village and electoral ward in the Metropolitan Borough of Trafford, Greater Manchester, England, within the historic county boundaries of Cheshire. It lies 9 mi (14 km) southwest of Manchester, southeast of Altrincham. The population at the 2021 census was 16,715.

== History ==
The toponym "Hale" derives from the Old English halh, meaning a nook or shelter, as supported by the surrounding area that has natural features that provide shelter. The name Hale occurs in a number of places throughout Britain.

The oldest record of Hale is in the Domesday Book of 1086. However, what little evidence there is – in the form of etymology and a few surviving records of events in the area – points to Saxons settling the area in the 7th century. The Domesday Book records that in the reign of Edward the Confessor in the mid-11th century a Saxon thegn, Ælfward, held the manor of Hale, and after the Norman Conquest of England his lands were held by the Norman Hamon de Massey who also gained Dunham and Bowdon. The Massey family remained barons of this area until the mid-14th century, due to the extinction of the Massey line. A this time Hale was divided between the Booths of Dunham – the family that became the Earls of Stamford – and two other owners. Throughout this period the area around Hale was mainly agricultural.

Hale expanded and prospered over throughout the Middle Ages to the extent that by the middle of the 15th century a tithe barn had been established in Hale Barns – the value of the tithe taken from Hale was more than double that of any other township in the Bowdon parish. The growth of Hale resulted in the establishment of Hale Barns as a separate settlement to the east. Previously Hale Barns had merely been an isolated extension of the main settlement of Hale, but the first explicit reference to the village of Hale Barns is in documentation from 1616.

The Cheshire Midland Railway (later the Cheshire Lines Committee) opened from Altrincham to Knutsford on 22 May 1862 with a station in Hale named Peel Causeway. It was the arrival of the railway in Hale in the mid-19th century that prompted the change from an agricultural village to a commuter area for middle class merchants working in the city. The station was renamed Hale in 1902.

== Governance ==
There is one main tier of local government covering Hale, at metropolitan borough level: Trafford Council. The council is a member of the Greater Manchester Combined Authority (GMCA), which is led by the directly-elected Mayor of Greater Manchester. For national elections, Hale forms part of the Altrincham and Sale West constituency.

=== Administrative history ===
Hale was historically a township in the ancient parish of Bowdon, which formed part of the Bucklow Hundred of Cheshire. From the 17th century onwards, parishes were gradually given various civil functions under the Poor Laws, in addition to their original ecclesiastical functions. In some cases, including Bowdon, the civil functions were exercised by each township separately rather than the parish as a whole. In 1866, the legal definition of 'parish' was changed to be the areas used for administering the poor laws, and so Hale became a civil parish.

When elected parish and district councils were established in 1894, Hale was given a parish council and included in the Bucklow Rural District. In 1900, the parish was converted into an urban district, with the exception of the more rural eastern part of the parish which was separated from Hale to become a new parish called Ringway.

Hale Urban District was abolished in 1974 under the Local Government Act 1972. The area became part of the Metropolitan Borough of Trafford in Greater Manchester.

== Geography ==
Hale is southeast of Altrincham with the villages of Hale Barns and Bowdon to the east and west respectively. Hale is bounded by the River Bollin to the south and Altrincham Golf Course to the north. The local geology consists of sand and gravel deposited in the last ice age. In common with much of Cheshire, the bedrock of Hale is mainly sandstone.

Sub-districts

- Hale Barns

== Demography ==
Hale compared
2001 UK census	Hale	Trafford	England
Total population	15,315	205,357	49,138,831
White	93.6%	89.7	91%
Asian	4.1%	4.6	4.6%
Black	0.3%	0.7	2.3%

According to the Office for National Statistics, at the time of the 2001 United Kingdom census, Hale had a population of 15,315. The 2001 population density was 2,847 per km², with a 100 to 96.6 female-to-male ratio. Of those over 16 years old, 25.5% were single (never married) and 56.2% married. Hale's 6,198 households included 26.0% one-person, 45.8% married couples living together, 5.3% were co-habiting couples, and 5.6% single parents with their children. Of those aged 16–74, 13.7% had no academic qualifications, significantly lower than the averages of Trafford (24.7%) and England (28.9%).

In 1931, 26.4% of Hale's population was middle class compared with 14% in England and Wales, and by 1971, this had increased to 56.3% compared with 24% nationally. Parallel to this doubling of the middle classes in Hale was the decline of the working class population. In 1931, 14.9% were working class compared with 36% in England and Wales; by 1971, this had decreased to 10.6% in Hale and 26% nationwide. The rest of the population was made up of clerical workers and skilled manual workers or other miscellaneous. This shows that Hale is an affluent suburb, alongside neighbouring Bowdon. Hale was named by The Daily Telegraph as the 12th most expensive place in Britain with house prices 194% higher than those in surrounding areas and having increased by 78% since 2003.

=== Population change ===
Population growth in Hale since 1801
Year	1801	1811	1821	1831	1841	1851	1861	1871	1881	1891	1901
Population	783	929	958	945	974	995	1,160	1,711	2,222	3,114	4,562
Year	1911	1921	1931	1939	1951	1961	1971	1991	2001	2011	2021
Population	8,351	9,300	10,667	13,208	12,152	14,800	17,065	15,868	15,315		10,437
Source: A Vision of Britain through Time

== Economy ==
Hale compared
2001 UK census	Hale	Trafford	England
Population of working age	10,672	151,445	35,532,091
Full-time employment	37.6%	43.4%	40.8%
Part-time employment	11.5%	11.9%	11.8%
Self-employed	14.5%	8.0%	8.3%
Unemployed	1.6%	2.7%	3.3%
Retired	16.6%	13.9%	13.5%

According to the 2001 UK census, the industry of employment of residents aged 16–74 was 24.7% property and business services, 14.5% retail and wholesale, 12.1% health and social work, 10.7% manufacturing, 9.9% education, 6.3% transport and communications, 4.6% finance, 4.1% construction, 3.6% hotels and restaurants, 3.3% public administration, 0.6% agriculture, 0.6% energy and water supply, 0.1% mining, and 5.0% other. Compared with national figures, Hale had a relatively high percentage of residents working in property, and a relatively low percentage working in agriculture, public administration, and manufacturing. The census recorded the economic activity of residents aged 16–74, 1.7% students were with jobs, 4.6% students without jobs, 7.3% looking after home or family, 2.5% permanently sick or disabled, and 2.2% economically inactive for other reasons. The 1.6% unemployment rate of Hale was low compared with the national rate of 3.3%, and the proportion of people who were self-employed was significantly higher than the national average of 8.3.

== Religion ==
At the 2021 UK census, 45.4% of Hale's residents reported themselves as being Christian, 8.4% Jewish, 15.6% Muslim, 3.6% Hindu, 0.5% Buddhist, and 0.8% Sikh. The census recorded 20.1% as having no religion, 0.2% had an alternative religion and 5.3% did not state their religion.

=== Christian landmarks ===
St. Peter's Church of England church was built in 1892 and is a fine example of late Victorian architecture. Hale Chapel was established in Hale Barns by Nonconformists in 1723 on what is now Chapel Lane. It underwent alterations around 1880. The Chapel is the earliest place of worship in either Hale or Hale Barns and is a Grade II* listed building. It also features an eighteenth-century pulpit and nineteenth-century stained glass.

=== Jewish landmarks ===
The Hale & District Hebrew Congregation was founded in 1976. Having started in a flat, the community moved to their current synagogue on Shay Lane in 1978. The move was necessary due to increasing attendance. The original Shule and Community Centre building in Hale served its members for 20 years until the community outgrew its facilities. In 2002, a rebuilding project was launched, forcing the congregation to hold its services in a tent in a neighbouring field for 16 months, until the new Hale Shule and P.J. Davis Community Centre was consecrated and opened in March 2003. A Sephardi synagogue is also undergoing construction, and is due to be open later this year or in early 2015.

=== Muslim landmarks ===
In July 2003 the former St David's Church on Grove Lane, Hale was converted it into a mosque by the Altrincham Muslim Association. The mosque serves the Muslim community of Hale and families who live in the outlying areas of Lymm, Mobberley, Bucklow Hill, Mere and Knutsford.

== Transport ==
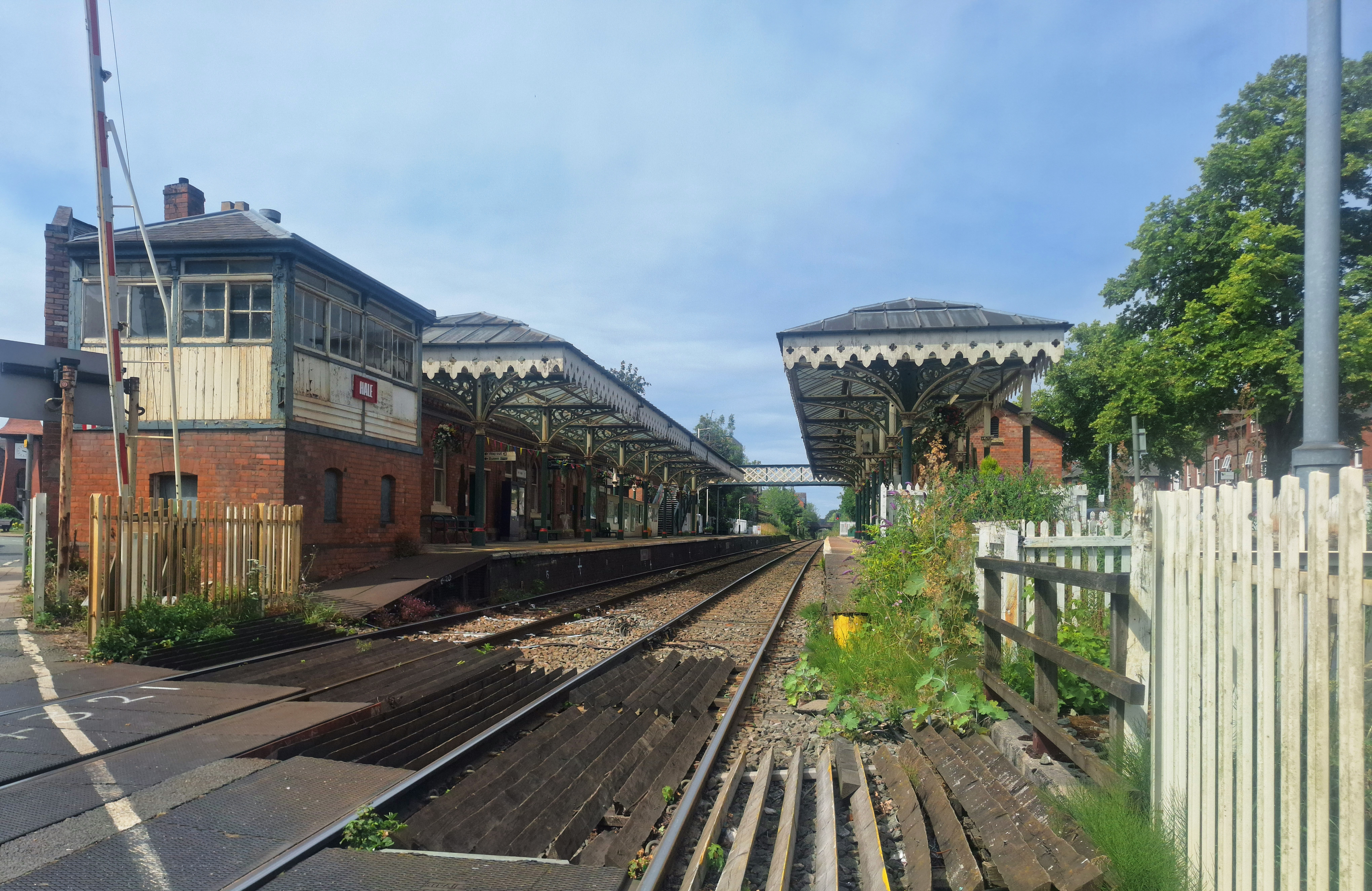
Platforms of Hale railway station in 2026

Hale is near the transport interchange in Altrincham and has regular bus services to Hale and Hale Barns. The village is also west of Manchester Airport. Hale railway station, in the centre of Hale, is on the Mid-Cheshire line between Chester and Manchester.

== Landmarks and culture ==
Royd House is situated on Hale Road. The house was designed by architect Edgar Wood and built for himself as his home. It is regarded as one of the most advanced examples of early-20th century domestic architecture and is referenced in a number of architectural digests. Royd House is a Grade I listed building.

The centre of Hale village includes a bowling green. Another former crown green bowling green attached to the Bull's Head public house in nearby Hale Barns is now utilised as a beer garden. Hale has many parks, including Stamford Park, named after the Earl of Stamford, who lived at Dunham Massey.

Hale Library was formerly situated on Leigh Road. In 2015 Trafford Council announced plans to sell the Leigh Road site for redevelopment. After several years of consultation, the library was closed in 2020, demolished and replaced with housing. A new Hale Library and Community Centre (incorporating a new bowling pavilion) was built on the site of the former bowling green pavilion, finally opening in November 2023 after several delays. The Community Centre is owned and operated by Hale Community Trust, with the library service provided by Trafford Council.

== Notable people ==
- Sir John Gaddum (1900–1965), pharmacologist who co-discovered the neuropeptide Substance P in 1931.
- George Rodger (1908–1995), photojournalist, noted for his work in Africa.
- Alan Stoddard (1915–2002), osteopath and vegetarianism activist.
- Sir Colin Shepherd (1938–2024), politician, MP for Hereford 1974 to 1997.
- Jannette Roscoe (born 1946), retired sprinter who competed at the 1972 and 1976 Summer Olympics.
- Emily Steel (born 2003), an English weightlifter who broke the British U23 record in the clean and jerk in 2023.

== See also ==
- Listed buildings in Hale, Greater Manchester
- List of people from Trafford
