= Cotterill Clough Nature Reserve =

Nature reserve in Manchester, England

- Location within Greater Manchester
- Interactive map of Cotterill Clough Nature Reserve
- Type: Nature reserve and SSSI
- Location: near Manchester Airport
- OS grid: SJ805839
- Coordinates: 53.3501°N 2.2911°W
- Area: 5.6 hectares (14 acres)
- Elevation: 50m
- Operator: Cheshire Wildlife Trust
- Open: no

Cotterill Clough is a 5.6-hectare (14-acre) nature reserve near Manchester Airport. It is managed by the Cheshire Wildlife Trust and lies within a larger Site of Special Scientific Interest (SSSI). The Cotterill Brook, which flows through the reserve, is a tributary of the River Bollin. The reserve was purchased in 1934 by public subscription as a memorial to T. A. Coward (1867–1933), a famous Cheshire naturalist. It is 15 kilometres (9.3 miles) south of Manchester city centre and adjacent to Manchester Airport.

== Description ==
Cotterill Clough is a ravine, or clough, formed by the Cotterill Brook eroding the Keuper Marl rock. The site is mostly wooded and contains the highest biological diversity of this type of woodland growing on base rich soils in Greater Manchester.

== Flora and fauna ==
Within the woodland there are three distinct zones. The first is on the edge of the plateau, where the woodland canopy is dominated by downy birch, pedunculate oak and sycamore; lower down the valley sides is a second zone dominated by ash and wych elm, home to a highly diverse ground glora. Lastly, the ravine bottom supports species that prefer wetter soils such as alder and willows of different species. The humid conditions in this zone are ideal for ferns, mosses and liverworts to flourish among the herbs.

A variety of woodland birds are present such as spotted flycatcher, three species of woodpecker, Eurasian blackcap and common whitethroat, which breed within the reserve. The reserve also has a diverse invertebrate fauna: 79 species of spider have been recorded as well as the rare beetle species Dropephylla grandiloqua.

== Management ==
Cotteril Clough is closed to the public at the moment as there is dangerous infrastructure on site and the Cheshire Wildlife Trust also want to leave standing dead wood to encourage biodiversity.
