= British Schools Karting Championship =

The British Schools Karting Championship was set up in late 2003 as a means to promote karting to teenage school children in the United Kingdom. The main principle of the championship is to enable as many young people as possible to enjoy karting without having to spend thousands of pounds buying and maintaining karts. The championship achieves this by providing all the karts for the young drivers to race on in what is known as 'arrive-and-drive' kart racing. This reduces the cost of competing in a sport that otherwise expensive and inaccessible. In this sense the championship differs significantly from the National Schools Karting Association (NatSKA) because schools competing in NatSKA are required to purchase and maintain their karts in order to race them.

== Event chronology ==
In 2009, 550 teams entered the championship, with over 1500 drivers competing. The racing was divided into a semi-final, 7 regional finals, and the national final held on 29 March 2009. The South Eastern Regional Final was won by Felpham Community College, while South Yorkshire's Armthorpe School competed in the first of three successive national finals the school would contest between 2009 and 2011, with a best of 8th in 2009.

In 2010, 573 teams (1719 drivers) from 189 schools took part. The top 34 teams from the regional finals went on to compete in the national final at Daytona Milton Keynes held on 27 March. Scotland's Hutchesons' Grammar School went on to seal victory by a margin of 5 points in front of Hurstmere A. Ponteland High School rounded of the podium and Northern Ireland's Regent House A went on to finish in 4th. In 2011 the running of the BSKC was taken over by the British Automobile Racing Club, the UK's motor sport club. 450 teams (1350 drivers) entered from 176 schools. The competition was won by Altrincham Grammar School for Boys A, with Winterbourne International Academy 2nd and Hutchesons' Grammar School A 3rd. The top 3 were separated by only 4 points.
