= Listed buildings in Middleton, Greater Manchester =

Middleton is a town in the Metropolitan Borough of Rochdale, Greater Manchester, England, and it is unparished. The town and the surrounding countryside contain 45 listed buildings that are recorded in the National Heritage List for England. Of these, one is listed at Grade I, the highest of the three grades, seven are at Grade II*, the middle grade, and the others are at Grade II, the lowest grade. Until the coming of the Industrial Revolution Middleton was a village, then came the industries of silk, cotton and coal. The oldest listed buildings consist of a church and vicarage, country houses, a school, a public house, and a bridge. The Rochdale Canal passes through the area, and locks and a bridge on it are listed. The later listed buildings include more churches, houses and schools, a drinking fountain, a bank, a club, a cotton mill, a park feature, and war memorials. The architect Edgar Wood lived in the town and he, sometimes with his partner Henry Sellars, designed some of the later listed buildings.

== Key ==
Grade	Criteria
I	Buildings of exceptional interest, sometimes considered to be internationally important
II*	Particularly important buildings of more than special interest
II	Buildings of national importance and special interest

== Buildings ==
Name and location	Photograph	Date	Notes	Grade
St Leonard's Church; 53.55329°N 2.19461°W		13th century	The church contains some surviving Norman material, it was largely rebuilt in 1412, and again in 1524 from which most of the present church is constituted. The southeast vestry dates from 1662, the top stage of the tower from about 1667, there was a partial rebuilding in 1869, and in 1957–60 George Pace added a new north porch and vestries. The church is built in stone on a plinth, and the top stage of the tower is weatherboarded. It consists of a nave with a clerestory, north and south aisles, north and south porches, a chancel with a southeast vestry, and a west tower. The tower has four stages, diagonal buttresses, clock faces, and the top stage has gables on each side. The parapets of the nave and the aisles are embattled.	I
The Old Rectory; 53.55355°N 2.19813°W	—	Early 16th century	Originally a timber framed house on a projecting plinth with a hall open to the roof. It was later enclosed in brick, and a floor was inserted, giving two storeys. The house has a stone-slate roof and five bays. On the front is a gabled porch, and the doorway has a moulded surround and a fanlight. To the left are mullioned and transomed, and to the right the windows are sashes. Inside much timber framing remains.	II
Former Queen Elizabeth Old Grammar School and schoolmaster's house 53.55369°N 2.19144°W		1586	The school is in stone on a projecting plinth, with quoins and a stone-slate roof. It has a rectangular plan with stair wings projecting to the rear at the ends. The schoolroom in the centre is open to the roof, and the ends are divided into two storeys. Lighting the schoolroom are two large mullioned and transomed windows, and the other windows are smaller and mullioned. Between the large windows is a Tudor arched doorway. The schoolmaster's house is in brick with two storeys, and is at right angles at the rear. It dates from between 1835 and 1839, it is linked to the school, and its windows are horizontally-sliding sashes.	II*
Tonge Hall; 53.54895°N 2.18619°W		After 1587	The house is timber framed on a stone plinth, with alterations in brick, and a stone-slate roof. It has a T-shaped plan, with two storeys and four bays. The first bay is a gabled cross-wing, the second bay also projects and is gabled, and in the fourth bays is a gabled porch. The upper floor, eaves and gables are jettied, and there is extensive use of quatrefoil panels. The windows are mullioned and transomed, and elsewhere there are casement windows and horizontally-sliding sash windows. Inside is an inglenook and a bressumer.	II*
Scowcroft Farmhouse; 53.55525°N 2.17229°W	—	16th or 17th century	The farmhouse is basically timber framed, and has an H-shaped plan with a hall and cross-wings and an additional wing at the rear. The timber framing is either rendered or rebuilt in brick. The roof is partly in stone-slate and partly in 20th-century tiles. The house has two storeys, there is a central gabled porch, and the windows are casements.	II
Ye Olde Boar's Head public house 53.55289°N 2.19680°W		Early 17th century	The public house, officially Greater Manchester's oldest pub, is timber framed on a projecting stone plinth, and has a stone-slate roof and an extension to the right in brick. There are two storeys, five bays, three of which are gabled, and a rear outshut. The windows on the upper floor are mullioned, and on the ground floor some are casements and others are sashes. There are two doorways in the second bay, one with a fanlight, and the other is blocked. The fifth bay, added in the 18th century, contains a Venetian window incorporating double doors. In 2015 The Middleton Archaeological Society, funded by the Middleton Township Heritage Lottery Fund used dendrochronology to date the building. The building was dated to 1622, making it Greater Manchester's oldest serving pub.	II*
Lever Bridge; 53.54457°N 2.20543°W		1636	The bridge carries a road over the River Irk. It is in stone and consists of a single segmental arch. The bridge has a band, a keystone, and parapets with chamfered tops that splay out at the ends. It also contains inscribed stones.	II
Hopwood Hall; 53.57112°N 2.19022°W	—	17th century	A house incorporating elements of a 16th-century timber framed hall, with later alterations and extensions, and subsequently part of a college. It is in brick with stone dressings and a stone-slate roof, and has two storeys and a quadrangular plan. Access to the courtyard is through a gatehouse with a projecting plinth, quoins, mullioned and transomed windows, an oriel window, and a segmental arch. In the courtyard is a library dating from about 1755 with a later bay window, and other buildings.	II*
Lower Whittle Farmhouse; 53.57068°N 2.22804°W	—	17th century	A timber framed farmhouse, enclosed in rendered stone and with a slate roof. A bay was added to the left in the 19th century. The house has two storeys, four bays with a cross-wing to the right and an outshut further to the right. There is a projecting plinth, a doorway with a fanlight, and the windows are 20th-century casements. Inside, the timber framing has brick nogging and wattle and daub infill.	II
Home Farm Dairy; 53.54322°N 2.20311°W	—	Before 1735	Originally the stable for Alkrington Hall, later converted into a house and workshop. It is in rendered brick on a projecting plinth, with rusticated quoins, an eaves cornice and a stone-slate roof. There are two storeys, three bays, a one-bay extension to the left, and lean-to sheds at the rear. The doorway has a Gibbs surround and a fanlight, and the ground floor windows are casements. On the upper floor are a central oeil-de-boeuf window, an oculus to the left, and a square opening to the right, all with keystones.	II
Alkrington Hall; 53.54315°N 2.20376°W		1735–37	The hall was designed by Giacomo Leoni in Palladian style, and has since been divided into separate dwellings. It is in brick with stone dressings, quoins, and a hipped roof, partly of slate and partly of tiles. It has three storeys, a double-depth plan, a main block with nine bays, and flanking pavilion wings. The middle three bays project slightly, they have a rusticated ground floor, and are flanked above by Ionic pilasters. The windows are sashes, in the middle three bays with architraves, the central window on the middle floor with a pediment, and in the outer bays with keystones. At the top is a parapet, balustraded over the middle three bays.	II*
83–87 Long Street; 53.55199°N 2.19681°W	—	Late 18th century	A pair of houses and loomshops, later shops, in brick with applied timber framing and render on the front, and a slate roof. There are three storeys, three bays, and a rear outshut. On the ground floor is a central passage doorway flanked by shop fronts. The middle floor contains three windows, and on the top floor is a central taking-in door converted into a window, flanked by six-light loomshop windows containing horizontally-sliding sash windows.	II
Lock No. 58 and bridge 53.56798°N 2.17578°W		Between 1794 and 1804	The lock on the Rochdale Canal is in dressed stone and has double upper-gates. At the south is a segmental-arched stone bridge with a band and triangular-topped coping. There are terminal piers at the east end, and at the west end the walls sweep down to ground level.	II
Slattocks Top Lock and bridge 53.57277°N 2.17572°W		Between 1794 and 1804	This is lock No. 54 on the Rochdale Canal. It is in dressed stone, and there are double gates at both ends. At the south is a segmental-arched stone bridge with a band and triangular-topped coping.	II
Ice house, Hopwood Hall; 53.57177°N 2.18080°W	—	c. 1830	The ice house is in brick, and consists of a circular chamber 4 metres (13 ft) in diameter. There are the remains of the brick entrance chamber.	II
School House; 53.55257°N 2.19638°W		1842	The school was extended in 1889 and 1892, and has since been used for other purposes. It is in stone on a projecting plinth with a stone-slate roof, and has two storeys, a symmetrical front of four bays, and a parallel range at the rear. The ground floor windows have mullions and transoms, the upper floor windows have mullions only, and there is a continuous hood mould above the ground floor windows. On the front are two projecting chimney stacks.	II
Providence United Reformed Church; 53.55140°N 2.19461°W		1859–60	The church is in brick with stone dressings and a slate roof. The front is on a plinth and has a band, rusticated quoins, and paired doorways. The doorways have round-headed fanlights and pilasters with an entablature, and are flanked by segmental-headed windows.	II
Holy Trinity Church; 53.55001°N 2.20557°W		1862	The church, designed by George Shaw, is in stone, it has slate roofs with coped gables, and is in Decorated style. The church consists of a nave, a south porch, and a chancel with a south double-gabled transept and vestry and a polygonal apse. On the west gable is a bellcote.	II
Rhodes Schools; 53.54606°N 2.22371°W		1884	The school, designed by Edgar Wood, is in brick with a slate roof and a tile crested ridge. There are two storeys and 20 bays with four bays later added to each end. On the ground floor is an arcade with eight round-arched openings, and on the upper floor is a hall. The outer bays and the additions are gabled, and the windows are casements. At the rear are two porches, and in the roof are four dormers.	II
Fountain Horse Trough; 53.56615°N 2.22588°W		1888	The drinking fountain was designed by Edgar Wood, and was relocated in the late 20th century. It is in gritstone and brick, and has is a central pier on a brick base with a semicircular arch passing through it. The pier has a moulded cap with dome finials on the corners. In the base are two stone troughs for horses and dogs.	II
31–37 Broad Street; 53.54528°N 2.22290°W		1889	A terrace of four houses by Edgar Wood in common brick with dressings in red engineering brick and a slate roof. They have two storeys, and consist of two inner houses, and two outer houses with an L-shaped plan and gables protruding forward. The entrances to the outer houses are in porches on the sides, and at their fronts is a canted bay window. The inner houses have a bay window in the angles, there is a double doorway with a flat porch. Above all the porches is a small segmental fanlight.	II
Redcroft and Fencegate and garden wall 53.55603°N 2.19670°W		1889	A pair of houses by Edgar Wood in brick with rendered upper floors, stone dressings and a clay tile roof. They have two storeys with attics, four bays and a rear wing. In the outer bays are two-storey canted bay windows containing mullioned windows, also with transoms on the ground floor. The doorway has an elliptical head with brick and stone voussoirs. The first two bays are gabled, and there is a dormer in the roof of the fourth bay. In the left return is a large porch. The garden wall has alternating brick and Portland stone, iron-railed sections and two gate portals with ogee lintels.	II
Temple Street Baptist Church; 53.55120°N 2.18604°W		1889	The church, later used for other purposes, was the first church designed by Edgar Wood. It is in red brick with decoration in orange and yellow brick, it has roofs of Welsh slate, and consists of a main body and flanking lower aisles. The entrance front has a round-headed arch above which is an arcade of nine round-arched windows, and it is flanked by pilasters with bands of red and yellow brick. At the top is a gable with chequerwork decoration. The aisles are also gabled with decoration in the gables, and contain three arched windows. All the gables have finials. Along the sides are eight bays with lancet windows.	II
Hillcrest and Briarhill; 53.55623°N 2.19658°W		1892	A pair of semi-detached houses by Edgar Wood, and containing early Art Nouveau features, they are in Ruabon brick with terracotta dressings, and have roofs of Welsh and Westmorland slate with blue ridge tiles. They consist of a central three-storey cross-wing flanked by two-storey blocks with attics. The central block is gabled with finials and has canted corners. Each side block has a recessed entrance bay, outside which is a gabled bay with a two-storey bow window and a Diocletian window in the attic. Most of the windows are replacement casements.	II
Royal Bank of Scotland; 53.55095°N 2.19648°W		1892	The bank, designed by Edgar Wood, is faced with pink terracotta and has a tiled roof. It has three storeys and three gabled bays. The main doorway has a round arch, a blocked archivolt and coat of arms above. Also on the ground floor are two secondary doorways and three mullioned and transomed windows. The windows on the upper floors are also mullioned and transomed.	II
Long Street Methodist Church and Sunday School; 53.55231°N 2.19703°W		1899	The church and associated buildings were designed by Edgar Wood and are arranged around a courtyard garden. The church is in brick on a stone plinth, with stone dressings, buttresses, and a stone-slate roof with coped gables and a finial, and consists of a nave and aisles. At the west end facing the street is a five-light arched window, to the left is a porch and an archway linking to the school. Around the rest of the courtyard are one and two storey buildings with casement windows and a canted bay window.	II*
51 and 53 Rochdale Road; 53.55699°N 2.19606°W		1900	A pair of houses by Edgar Wood in brick on a projecting plinth with stone dressings, quoins, and a stone-slate roof. There are two storeys with attics, four bays, and a rear wing. The central doorways have flat hoods, fanlights, and moulded lintels. In the outer bays are canted bay windows, on the left bay with two storeys, and on the right bay with one, and in the roof are two gabled dormers.	II
Arkholme; 53.55683°N 2.19660°W		1901	Originally a photographic studio, later converted into a house, it was designed by Edgar Wood, and is in brick with a tiled roof. It has two storeys and three bays. On the front the left bay projects forward, it has a flat roof in reinforced concrete and a stone-capped parapet. The entrance is in this bay and has a large wooden canopy. The windows are casements, that in the right part of the ground floor with ten lights. The left return is gabled and has a two-storey canted bay window. At the rear is a two-storey two-bay extension with a canted bay window and a six-light oriel window.	II
St Michael's Church; 53.54774°N 2.19059°W		1901–02	The church was designed by Austin and Paley in Perpendicular style, the nave was added in about 1910, and the tower in 1930. It is in stone and has a clay tile roof with coped gables and cross finials. The church consists of a nave with a clerestory, north and south aisles, a chancel with a vestry, chapel and organ chamber, and a tower to the west of the north aisle. The tower has four stages, diagonal buttresses, an octagonal stair turret, clock faces, and an embattled parapet.	II
36 Mellalieu Street; 53.55425°N 2.19896°W		1906	The house, designed by Edgar Wood and Henry Sellers, is in brick with a flat roof in reinforced concrete. It has two storeys and three bays, with a later extension to the rear and a garage to the left. The central doorway has a round-headed fanlight with a dentilled transom. To the left is a two-storey canted bay window, and the windows are mullioned, also with transoms on the ground floor. At the top is a stone-coped parapet.	II
Staircase and Exedra, Jubilee Park; 53.55326°N 2.19536°W		1906	Designed by Edgar Wood, the structure is in sandstone, and consists of 21 steps leading up to a semicircular enclosure with seats and an inscription.	II
St John's Church, Thornham; 53.57611°N 2.17180°W		1906–07	The church is in sandstone, it has slate roofs with coped gables, and is in Perpendicular style. It consists of a nave with a clerestory and a west baptistry, north and south aisles, a chancel with transepts, a south vestry, and a southwest tower. The tower has three stages, a south door, clock faces, and an embattled parapet.	II
Warwick Mill; 53.54762°N 2.19602°W		1907	A cotton mill by George Stott in brick with internal cast iron framing. There are five storeys and a basement, sides of 40 and 14 bays, and an engine house at the rear. There are two sill bands, at the top is a machicolated eaves frieze and a stone-coped parapet, and between the windows are pilasters. At the northeast corner is a water tower, two storeys above the main block, with the name in glazed tiles, an eaves cornice, and a steep pyramidal roof with iron cresting. In front of the mill are railings with Art Nouveau motifs.	II
33, 35 and 37 Middleton Gardens; 53.54862°N 2.19881°W		1908	A row of three shops by Edgar Wood and Henry Sellers in brick with tiles and a flat reinforced concrete roof. They have two storeys and on the ground floor are replaced shop fronts. On the upper floor each shop has mullioned windows flanked by tiled pilasters, above which is a tiled white panel with chevrons in green tiles, rising to form a parapet.	II
Elm Street School; 53.55000°N 2.17672°W	—	1908–10	The school was designed by Edgar Wood and J. Henry Sellers, and is in brick with dressings in Portland stone and concrete roofs. There is a central nine-bay hall with a tower at each end. Cloisters extend forward to the entrances on the street, and they enclose a single-storey office block with a concave front and a garden. Behind the hall are ranges of classrooms. The hall has a hipped roof and round-arched windows with impost blocks and keystones. The entrances on the street have rusticated arches and banded corner pilasters.	II*
Former Durnford Infant School and associated structures 53.55326°N 2.20160°W	—	1908–10	The surviving part of a school by Edgar Wood and Henry Sellers. It is in brick with dressings in Portland stone and a flat roof in reinforced concrete, and consists of a central hall with classrooms to the north, south and east. There is a single storey, a six-bay central section, and a lower three-bay range to the east. At the east end of the hall is a tower-like chimney with pilastered corners. The boundary walls, railings, gate piers and the arched entrance gateway are included in the listing.	II
Former Independent Labour Club; 53.55210°N 2.20009°W		1911–12	The club was designed by Edgar Wood and is in brick with concrete dressings and a roof of Westmorland green slate. It has one storey and six bays, the sixth bay being larger and canted, and a flat-roofed porch at the south. The first five bays contain round-headed windows, and the sixth bay has rectangular windows.	II
Church of St Gabriel War Memorial; 53.54419°N 2.17441°W	—	1921	The memorial stands to the west of St Gabriel's Church. It is in stone and consists of a Celtic cross on a pedestal and a plinth. Carved on the cross is a broadsword, a laurel wreath and a Lancashire rose. At the base of the cross is a scroll bracket and a festoon. On the pedestal are panels with inscriptions and the names of those lost in the two World Wars.	II
Thornham Parish War Memorial; 53.57596°N 2.17170°W		1921	The war memorial is in the churchyard to the south of St John's Church. It is in granite and consists of a plain cross with a laurel wreath carved in relief. The cross has a shaft that stands on a pedestal with a cornice, on a stepped base. On the pedestal is an inscription relating to the First World War and on the top step are the dates of the Second World War.	II
Birch-in-Hopwood War Memorial; 53.56666°N 2.22429°W	—	Early 1920s	The war memorial is in the churchyard of St Mary's church, and stands in the former chancel of an earlier demolished church. It is in stone, and consists of a Celtic cross on a canted pedestal, a stepped plinth, and a podium. On the cross is carved "IHS", and on the pedestal is a carved inscription and the names of those lost in the two World Wars.	II
Church of All Saints War Memorial; 53.54362°N 2.22650°W		1920s	The war memorial is in the churchyard of All Saints Church. It is in stone, and consists of an obelisk on a pedestal on a three-stepped plinth. Carved on the obelisk is a broadsword, a laurel wreath and a Lancashire rose. At the base of the cross is a scroll bracket and an inscribed canted panel. On the pedestal are three inscribed panels, two containing the names of those lost in the First World War.	II
War Memorial, perimeter walls and loggia, Garden of Remembrance; 53.54622°N 2.20945°W		1927	The formal garden is enclosed on the south and west sides by walls, and it contains a U-shaped loggia with terminal pavilions. The walls are in brick, with sandstone plinths and copings. At the entrance to the garden are pavilions with slate pyramidal roofs. The loggia is also in brick on a sandstone plinth with slate roofs. In front of it is the sandstone war memorial that consists of a tall tapering column surmounted by a cross and standing on an octagonal plinth and a square base. On the plinth is an inscribed granite plaque, behind the memorial is a curved wall with an inscribed granite frieze, and below that are the names of those lost in the First World War. At the ends of the wall are straight sections with the names of those lost in the Second World War.	II
Alkrington and Providence War Memorial; 53.53960°N 2.20156°W		1929	The memorial is in a garden outside the Alkrington and Providence United Reformed Church, and commemorates the union of two churches and the members of the church lost in the First World War. It is in red sandstone on a limestone plinth, and consists of two columns joined at the top and the bottom, on a rectangular pedestal, and surmounted by a Latin cross. On the pedestal is an inscription and the names of those lost in the First World War, and there is a later tablet with the names of those lost in the Second World War.	II
Church of All Saints and Martyrs, Langley; 53.55562°N 2.21038°W		1963–64	The church, chapel, and church hall are in red brick and reinforced concrete, the roof of the church is copper-clad, and the hall has a sheeted roof. The church consists of a nave, a sanctuary, a choir transept, a vestry, and a pointed west end containing a baptistry. From the baptistry, a corridor leads to a polygonal chapel. On the church roof is a steel flèche partly covered in fibreglass, with a bell and a Latin cross finial.	II
Former chapel, Hopwood Hall College; 53.57022°N 2.19009°W	—	1963–65	The chapel, designed by Frederick Gibberd, is in reinforced concrete, and has a copper roof. It has an octagonal plan, slit windows, a low-pitched roof, and a lantern with coloured glass. Inside there is a central altar, a projecting organ gallery, and a polygonal side chapel.	II
