= Upmeads =

House in Stafford, England

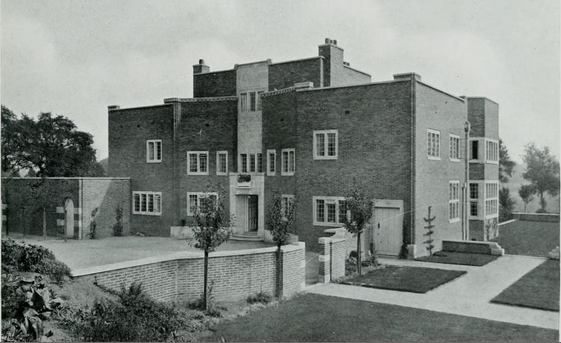
Entrance (left) and west faces of Upmeads c. 1911

Upmeads is a grade-II*-listed house on Newport Road in Stafford, Staffordshire, England, built in 1908 for a local businessman, Frederick Bostock, and his wife. The design by Edgar Wood is considered groundbreaking and a forerunner to Modernist architecture; Nikolaus Pevsner describes it as a "pioneer work and worthy of any book dealing with the pioneers of the C20 style internationally." The double-depth house is in red brick and ashlar stone, with two storeys and attics, under a flat concrete roof. It features a concave recessed central section to the entrance front, emphasised by a full-height stone band; the garden front also has a recessed central section with a stone band but lacking the curved profile. The interior has groin-vaulted hallways, and there are marble fireplaces, wood panelling and moulded plaster ceilings and friezes.

== Background and history ==
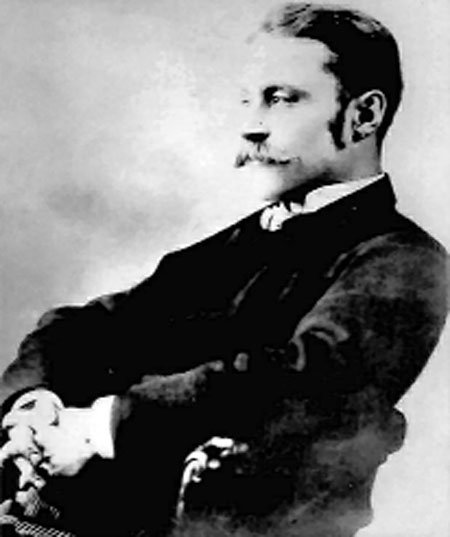
Edgar Wood, the architect

The architect Edgar Wood (1860–1935) came from a wealthy Unitarian background, and practised from around 1885 in the north west from offices in Middleton, and later Oldham and Manchester. Most of his British buildings are in that region. He considered architecture to be an artistic discipline; his interests encompassed vernacular architecture and cube-shaped Arabic domestic architecture. Although his early buildings fall within the Arts and Crafts movement, his style changed through his career, and from around 1897 he started to be influenced by Art Nouveau. An example is Banney Royd in Huddersfield (1900–1), a large house with Art Nouveau ornamentation, which employed some technical innovations. He also designed a few highly unusual buildings, notably the expressionistic First Church of Christ, Scientist, Manchester (1903–7), which Pevsner characterises as "weird".

In 1903 or 1904 Wood started to collaborate with J. Henry Sellers, who influenced him towards classicism and introduced him to reinforced concrete, which had been introduced from France at the end of the 19th century. In 1906, Sellers designed a small flat-roofed office block for Dronsfield Brothers in Oldham, which Pevsner considers to be of "strikingly similar character" to Upmeads, as well as "just as daring". Wood (often with Sellers) then designed several houses with flat concrete roofs: 36 Mellalieu Street, Middleton (1906) and Dalny Veed, Barley (1907) preceded Upmeads (1908), and the series culminated in his own house in Hale, Royd House (1914–16). Dalny Veed has a similar design to Upmeads, but its central recessed section is not curved. Although flat-roofed houses were then considered innovative in Britain, earlier examples exist including A. H. Mackmurdo's Brooklyn, 8 Private Road in Enfield, which dates from 1883–87, and John A. Brodie's 158 Wilbury Road in Letchworth of 1905, which was constructed from prefabricated panels of reinforced concrete.

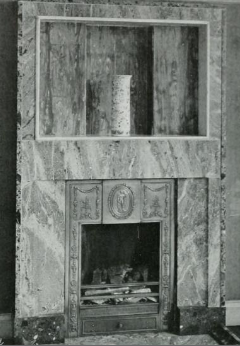
The marble fireplace in the dining room c. 1911, one of Upmeads' original features

The clients were Frederick Bostock and his wife Mabel (née Dorman). Bostock was a businessman who manufactured shoes; the family shoe business was well known locally. The couple were in the Plymouth Brethren. Mabel had attended Birmingham School of Art and her brother John Dorman knew the American architect Frank Lloyd Wright. Frederick's elder brother H. J. Bostock had commissioned a large house, Shawms, from the local architect Henry T. Sandy, dated 1905, which emulated Voysey's Arts and Crafts style. Frederick and Mabel Bostock wanted an innovative house, and are said to have rejected Sandy's plans for them for not being bold enough; Sandy might have recommended Wood to them. The household also included their son, as well as live-in servants.

Upmeads was built in 1908 by the Stafford firm Espley & Sons. The setting was then semi-rural, with nearby listed buildings including Stafford Castle and St Mary's Church, Castlebank (to the west), and Rowley Hall (to the south-east). Pevsner suggests that the name of the house refers to its original view over fields; an alternative suggestion for the name's origin is a reference to the William Morris novel, The Well at the World's End. The house passed to the Bostocks' nephew by marriage in 1957, after which much of the associated land was sold for building; by 1974, later housing had encroached on the site. The house left the Bostock family in 1985, when it was purchased by Ruth and Philip Hunter. It was on the market again in 2014 for nearly £1 million.

The house is among the best preserved of Wood's output; it has been little altered, and many original features were still present in 2014. Some changes from his plans have occurred; Wood had envisaged the entrance hall being finished with mahogany panelling, but this was never fitted. The panelling in the dining room was not in Wood's plan and dates from around 1920; the original windows in this room were also enlarged. The house was not at first connected to mains electricity, with gas being used for lighting. A tank room collected rainwater from the roof; this was converted into a shower room. The original service area had a butler's pantry, pantry and scullery in addition to the kitchen; all but the butler's pantry were amalgamated into a single kitchen in the late 1950s, and an additional window was inserted. A window onto the roof was also added before 1971, when Upmeads was listed. On the exterior, the detached single-storey "motor house" of the original plan had an upper storey added early on for the chaffeur.

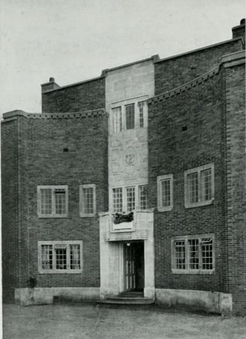
Entrance front detail c. 1911

== Description ==
=== Exterior ===
Upmeads stands at SJ9096522344, on a driveway off the north side of Newport Road (A518), in the west–south-west suburbs of Stafford. The medium-sized house follows a simple double-depth "cubic" plan. The style is given in the listing as the Edwardian Free style; the house is also regarded as a late example of the Arts and Crafts movement or as a precursor to Modernist architecture. (Note: See the Critical reception section for details) It is in Staffordshire brick, in red with tints of grey and purple, with dressings of Bath stone ashlar, under a flat concrete roof. There are two storeys with attics, which are set back, only over the central portion. The windows throughout have mullions with a square-cut profile.

The symmetrical entrance (north) front has a central curved recessed section, with the main entrance in the centre, flanked by three-light windows. Above the door is a decorative element similar to a portcullis, bearing the year 1908. The stone door surround is continued upwards through the first floor and onto the attic level, forming a prominent central vertical stripe. Within this stone band are three-light windows at first floor and attic level, with a carved decorative panel between them, featuring Frederick and Mabel Bostock's initials. At the roof level of both first-floor and attic storeys runs a brick parapet finished with a stone coping; the coping to the central curved section is embellished.

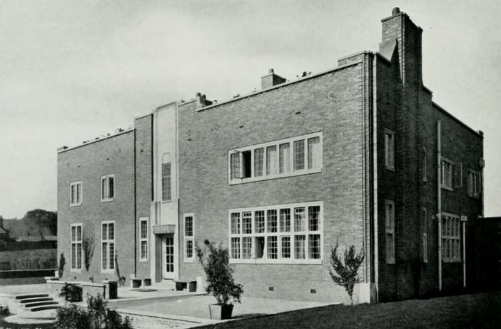
Garden front c. 1911

There is also a recessed centre to the garden (south) front, which lacks the curve of the entrance front but is again emphasised by a full-height ashlar band. The central entrance has a glass-panelled door; it is surmounted by a stone canopy and flanked by paired narrow windows, with a single long narrow window above the door. The windows on the flanks of this face are placed asymmetrically, with a single seven-light window to the right and paired two-light windows to the left. The ground-floor windows are all tall and transomed; the upper storey follows the same pattern except that the windows lack transoms.

The asymmetrical west face has an entrance with an ashlar surround and a two-storey canted projecting bay, with bay windows to the ground floor and first floor. The principal ground-floor windows on this face are transomed. There is a chimney stack. The east side is screened by a brick wall, forming a kitchen court, with two entrances with arched tops. This face has a small projecting wing at the north end, originally including a coal store.

=== Interior ===
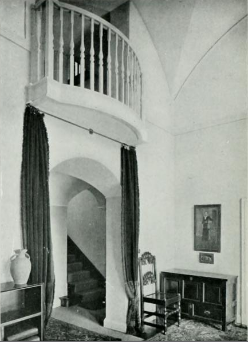
Entrance hall, showing curved balcony c. 1911

The house has an axial plan. The main full-height entrance hall is at the rear, and is accessed from the garden front; it is groin vaulted and has a slightly projecting, curved balcony in an arched opening at the first-floor level. This hall gives access to the drawing room (west) and dining room (east); a single-storey, groin-vaulted corridor connects it with the entrance on the north front, which accesses the stairs and the service areas, and also provides an additional entrance to the dining room.

The large drawing room has panelling and a marble fireplace flanked with fluted pilasters and built-in cupboards; the fireplace is at the centre of a curved convex wall (not associated with the exterior concave curve of the entrance front). The 17th-century-styled panelling in the dining room is not original; this room has a built-in sideboard, perhaps designed by Wood, and a fireplace of two shades of green marble, with a panel above of onyx-coloured Siena marble. A garden room in the west part was not accessible from the interior in the original plan.

The first floor has a passageway terminating in the balcony above the main hall and a cross corridor lit by two circular dome-shaped skylights, which gives access to the main bedrooms. The master bedroom, on the west side, over the drawing room, has a marble fireplace and a single oak-panelled wall, designed by Wood. The other family bedroom on this side has an original moulded plaster ceiling and frieze, and a fireplace. The larger bedroom on the east side was the main guestroom and has an unusual dark wallpaper with floral stripes, which is possibly original, as well as a marble fireplace. The smaller bedroom on this side has an original moulded ceiling and frieze. Servants were accommodated in two mezzanine-level rooms and in attic rooms. At the attic level there is also a large room which has been used as a bedroom and a sitting room.

=== Gardens ===
The garden front has a terrace (included in the listing) delineated by a low partly curved red-brick wall, finished with a stone coping and ball finials; paired stone steps descend from the terrace into the garden. To the south and west sides of the house lie formally laid out gardens, organised into separate outdoors "rooms", including a paved sunken garden, a pergola (which originated in Shawms) and a kitchen garden with fruit and nut trees. Although the original formal gardens were truncated when land was sold for building, some elements remain including a parterre, pond, stone-flagged paths and hedging in yew. The boundary to the south is lined with dawn redwoods, which are among Britain's earliest specimens of this tree. In addition, to the north-west of the house lies an informal garden with a summer house. The total area in 2014 was around 1.3 acres (0.5 ha).

== Critical reception ==
Upmeads gained only limited contemporary attention. Wood showed a drawing of the entrance front at the Royal Academy in 1908, but the design was not well received. The house was described in 1909 in The Architectural Review, which published the plans and several photographs. The architectural writer Lawrence Weaver reviewed the house in 1911 in his book Small Country Houses of To-day; he acknowledges its originality, calling it "distinctive and interesting", but describes the house as "fortress-like", having an "air of austerity" and "unusual to the point of oddness". He was not convinced of the practicality of the flat roof, and also noted that the full-height hall reduced the number of bedrooms.

The architectural historian Nikolaus Pevsner describes Upmeads in a 1942 article as an "anachronism" and "the only English private house of the early twentieth century which looks as if it might have been designed about 1935 with a view to expressing the structural characteristics of concrete", with only its "slightly Tudor-looking windows" suggesting its actual date. In his 1974 guide to the buildings of Staffordshire, he calls it a "pioneer work and worthy of any book dealing with the pioneers of the C20 style internationally" as well as "one of the most interesting houses" of its date in England. The architectural historian Alastair Service, in a 1977 book on Edwardian architecture, describes Upmeads and Wood's other flat-roofed houses as "revolutionary", and ascribes Upmeads' design to a "contemporary move towards rectangular design and decoration", for example, in the works of Charles Rennie Mackintosh and Charles Holden.

Historic England gives Upmeads as an example of an English house built before the First World War featuring "most of the seminal Modern Movement traits"; the listing considers it to have a "very advanced design for its date". The architectural writer Alan Powers considers Upmeads, and Wood's other flat-roofed houses, to be examples of "proto-Modernism", writing that "Upmeads was as modern as houses ever got before 1914" with a design "more refined than any previous experiment in the domestic use of concrete", but considers the house to be a "dead end" that failed to influence the course of British architecture. Powers describes the style of Upmeads as a "combination of neo-Tudor and neo-Georgian" and the group of flat-roofed houses as "visually simplified late products of the Arts and Crafts Movement". The architecture writer David Morris compares Upmeads with the Stoclet Palace in Brussels (1905–11), by Josef Hoffmann, noting that they share the recessed concave-curved section flanked by cubic sections, which in the Stoclet Palace is on the garden front, as well as having internal similarities of plan; it is not known whether Wood ever met Hoffmann or saw the plans for the Brussels building.

== See also ==
- Grade II* listed buildings in Stafford (borough)
- Listed buildings in Stafford (Outer Area)

== References and notes ==
Sources

- David Morris (2012). 'Here, by experiment': Edgar Wood in Middleton. Bulletin of the John Rylands University Library of Manchester 89 (1): 127–60
- Nikolaus Pevsner. Staffordshire (The Buildings of England) (Penguin Books; 1974) ISBN 0-14-071046-9
- Nikolaus Pevsner. Pioneers of Modern Design, from William Morris to Walter Gropius (Penguin Books; 1974)
- Alan Powers. Modern: The Modern Movement in Britain (Merrell; 2005) ISBN 978-1-8589-4405-0
- Alan Powers. Britain: Modern Architectures in History (Reaktion Books; 2007) ISBN 978-1-86189-281-2
- Alastair Service. Edwardian Architecture: A Handbook to Building Design in Britain, 1890–1914 (Oxford University Press; 1977) ISBN 978-0195199796
- Lawrence Weaver. Small Country Houses of To-day (3rd edn) (Country Life; 1922)
