= Listed buildings in Stafford (outer area) =

Stafford is a town in the Borough of Stafford, Staffordshire, England. The unparished area contains 141 buildings that are recorded in the National Heritage List for England as designated listed buildings. Of these, one is listed at Grade I, the highest grade, 15 are listed at Grade II*, the middle of the three grades, and the others are at Grade II, the lowest grade. This list contains the listed buildings in the outer area of the town, including the suburb of Baswich; those in the central area are in Listed buildings in Stafford (Central Area).

The listed buildings in this area include churches with memorials in the churchyards and other related structures, houses and associated structures, buildings forming part of HM Prison Stafford, a former windmill, a road bridge, a former public house, the remains of Stafford Castle, a former hospital, schools, a former library, a boundary post, war memorials, and three bridges over the Staffordshire and Worcestershire Canal.

== Key ==
Grade	Criteria
I	Buildings of exceptional interest, sometimes considered to be internationally important
II*	Particularly important buildings of more than special interest
II	Buildings of national importance and special interest

== Buildings ==
Name and location	Photograph	Date	Notes	Grade
Holy Trinity Church, Baswich; 52.79820°N 2.08480°W		13th century	The church was altered and extended during the following centuries. The tower is in stone, the rest of the church is in brick with stone dressings, and the roof is tiled. The church consists of a nave, north and south transepts, a chancel, a vestry, and a west tower. The tower has diagonal buttresses, a south doorway, and a top cornice and a parapet. The windows are round-headed with keystones, and the south doorway has a rusticated surround. Inside the church is a Norman chancel arch.	II*
St Mary Castlechurch; 52.79693°N 2.14101°W		15th century	The oldest part of the church is the tower, with the nave and chancel built in 1844–45 by Scott and Moffatt, and the north aisle added by John Oldrid Scott in 1898. The church is built in stone with tile roofs, and consists of a nave with a north aisle, a south porch, a chancel with a north vestry, and a west tower. The tower has diagonal buttresses, a sundial, a two-light west window, a cornice with gargoyles, and an embattled parapet.	II*
Rickerscote Hall; 52.77972°N 2.10190°W	—	c. 1600	A house that was later extended, the early parts are timber framed, the later parts are in painted brick, and the roof is tiled. There are two storeys and attics, and an H-shaped plan, consisting of a hall range, later cross-wings, and 19th-century rear extensions. In the hall range is a gabled porch and a canted bay window. The other windows are a mix of sashes and casements.	II
62 and 63 Foregate Street; 52.81135°N 2.12061°W		c. 1698	The house has a timber framed core, and the front was rebuilt in the 20th century. It is built in chequer brick with stone dressings on a stone-coped plinth, with a floor band, a coved cornice, and a tile roof. The house is in Georgian style, and has two storeys and an attic, a double depth plan, a front of three bays, a lean-to extension on the right, and wings and an outshut at the rear. The round-headed doorway has fluted pilasters, a fanlight with radial glazing bars, an entablature, and a pedimented hood. The windows are sashes and there are three gabled dormers. Inside, there are timber framed cross-walls.	II
Friends' Meeting House; 52.81101°N 2.11983°W		1730	The Friends' meeting house is in brick and has a top cornice, and a tile roof with coped gables. There is a single storey, three bays, and a rear single-storey wing. The doorway has a bracketed gabled canopy over which is a bull's eye window and a datestone. The windows are cross-casements with fluted keystones.	II*
Forebridge Lock-up; 52.80288°N 2.11308°W		18th century	The former village lock-up is in stone, and has a stone roof, hipped at the right. There is a rectangular plan, and an entrance with a gabled lintel. The building incorporates part of a former inn.	II
Group of four headstones and a chest tomb 52.79814°N 2.08476°W	—	18th century	The memorials are in the churchyard of Holy Trinity Church, Baswich, and are in limestone. The chest tomb is to the memory of members of the Bradbury family, and has cabled angle balusters, a panel with concave angles and an oval panel, and a moulded cap. One headstone is to Henry Reding, and the others are to members of the Twigg family. Two headstones each contain a cartouche containing Rococo scrolls and a cherub above, and another has egg and dart decoration, an inscription, and a cherub above.	II
Group of three Ward memorials 52.79806°N 2.08471°W	—	18th century	The memorials are in the churchyard of Holy Trinity Church, Baswich, and are to the memory of members of the Ward family. They are in stone and consist of two headstones and a chest tomb. The headstones each contain a cartouche containing an inscription and a cherub above. The chest tomb has balusters with pointed arched panels, there are oval panels on the sides, and a moulded cap.	II
Headstone; 52.79805°N 2.08459°W	—	18th century	The headstone is in the churchyard of Holy Trinity Church, Baswich. It is in limestone, and has a segmental head, an oval cartouche with scrolled foliage and drapes, and cherubs above and below it. The surname in the inscription is not fully legible.	II
Walker head and foot stones 52.79805°N 2.08476°W	—	1756	The head and foot stone are in the churchyard of Holy Trinity Church, Baswich. The headstone has a shaped top, drapes on the sides, festoons and three cherubs on the top, and three skulls on the base. The separate foot stone is rectangular, and has a cornice on three sides, carved faces on the sides, and three upright praying figures with loincloths facing the headstone. The carving is primitive.	II
6 The Green; 52.80303°N 2.11455°W	—	Mid to late 18th century	A house in rendered brick with a tile roof, it has two storeys, a double depth plan, and a front of one bay. The doorway has a small fanlight, and above it is a bracketed canopy. The windows are sashes.	II
Harding tombs and headstone 52.79808°N 2.08499°W	—	Late 18th century	The monuments are in the churchyard of Holy Trinity Church, Baswich, and are to the memory of members of the Harding family. They are in stone, and consist of two chest tombs and a small headstone. Both chest tombs have square balusters and a bowed end. They are enclosed in an area surrounded by railings, and outside the enclosure is the headstone, which has a shaped head and an inscription.	II
Central Block, H. M. Prison; 52.81166°N 2.11805°W	—	1787–93	The prison block is in brick with stone dressings, bands, a coped parapet, and a slate roof. There are three storeys and a symmetrical plan, the centre projecting forward. In the centre is a plain stone porch, and above it is a Venetian window flanked by round-headed windows. The other windows have rusticated surrounds and iron grills. On the roof is a cupola.	II
Perimeter Walls, H. M. Prison; 52.81197°N 2.11880°W		c. 1790	The walls enclose the north and walls side of the prison grounds, and were altered in the 1950s. They are high walls in brick with stone dressings, offsets and stone copings. The gatehouse was rebuilt in 1953.	II
St Austin's Presbytery and chapel 52.80044°N 2.11542°W	—	1791	The presbytery and chapel are in Georgian style, and are in brick with stone dressings, sill bands, a modillioned cornice, and a hipped slate roof. There are three storeys, a symmetrical front of three bays, a rear gabled wing, and a small wing connecting to the church. The round-headed doorway has fluted pilasters, entablature blocks, a fanlight with radial glazing bars, and an open pediment, and the windows are sashes.	II
Broad Eye Windmill; 52.80678°N 2.12287°W		1796	A tower windmill that was built using materials from a demolished building, it is in stone, and consists of a conical tower. Above the entrance is an iron roundel with the date and initials, and the windows have wedge lintels and keystones.	II
20 and 21 Wolverhampton Road; 52.80145°N 2.11386°W	—	c. 1800	A pair of brick houses, No. 20 rendered, with a tile roof. They have two storeys, and each house has a symmetrical front of three bays, and a short rear wing. The doorways have pediments, and the windows are sashes with wedge lintels. Between the houses is a round-headed entry.	II
Former Eagle Inn, 15 Newport Road; 52.80278°N 2.12013°W		c. 1800	The former public house is in Georgian style. It is in brick on a stone-coped plinth, with end pilaster strips, wide eaves, and a slate roof. The side walls are plastered. There are two storeys, a double depth plan, a symmetrical three-bay front, and a rear wing. The central round-headed entrance has attached Composite columns, a fanlight with radial glazing bars, a cornice and a brick arch. In the ground floor it is flanked by canted bay windows, each with pilasters, a frieze and a cornice, and in the upper floor are sash windows.	II
Radford Bridge; 52.79280°N 2.09277°W		c. 1800	The bridge carries the A34 road over the River Penk. It is in stone, and consists of three elliptical arches, the outer arches being flood arches. The arches have voussoirs, and the central arch has a keystone. Above the cutwaters are paired engaged Tuscan columns, and the bridge has a frieze, a modillioned cornice, a plain coped parapet, and rusticated abutments sweeping forward.	II
Green Hall, Lichfield Road; 52.80293°N 2.11208°W		c. 1810	A house, later offices, it is in stuccoed brick with a floor band, end pilasters and an entablature, and a parapeted roof. There are two storeys and an attic, a front of seven bays, and later rear extensions. In the centre is a porch with paired Ionic columns, and the doorway has a small-paned fanlight. The windows in the attic are casements, and in the lower floors they are sashes. In the right return is a two-storey canted bay window.	II
Gates and gate piers, Green Hall; 52.80278°N 2.11222°W	—	c. 1810	There are two pairs of gate piers flanking central double gates and outer single gates. The piers are square and stuccoed and have simple caps. The gates are in cast iron, and there is a decorative ogival overthrow with a lamp.	II
St Joseph's Convent, South-east building 52.80179°N 2.11067°W		c. 1810	A house, later altered and used for other purposes, it is stuccoed with stone dressings, wide eaves with scrolled brackets, and a hipped slate roof. There are two storeys, a double depth plan, and a symmetrical front of five bays. In the centre is a two-storey portico with paired baseless columns, a frieze with scrolled relief carving, and a pediment with a cross. In the portico, steps lead up to a round-headed doorway that has an architrave and a fanlight. Most of the windows are sashes, and the small window above the doorway has an architrave and a casement window. In the left return is a balcony, the right return contains an oriel window, and at the rear are a single-storey wing, a three-storey wing with a verandah, and a lift shaft with a pyramidal roof.	II
Lycett tomb 52.79850°N 2.08505°W	—	1812	The chest tomb is in the churchyard of Holy Trinity Church, Baswich, and is to the memory of members of the Lycett family. It is in stone, and has square angle balusters, a moulded cap, oval side panels, and a bowed west end.	II
Stafford Castle remains 52.79793°N 2.14743°W		c. 1815	The castle was rebuilt on the site of a medieval castle, but as never completed and only the shell of the ground floor has survived. What remains are the lower parts of towers and the curtain wall.	II
Twigg Monument; 52.79826°N 2.08518°W	—	1815	The monument is in the churchyard of Holy Trinity Church, Baswich, and is to the memory of two members of the Twigg family. It is in stone, and is a square monument with a decorative head and a moulded cap. There are slate panels, and railings.	II
Boulton Monument; 52.79684°N 2.14083°W	—	1817 (probable)	The monument is in the churchyard of St Mary Castlechurch, and is to the memory of members of the Boulton family, who died between 1785 and 1864. It is in stone, and consists of a square monument on a rectangular platform, with a plain plinth, chamfered angles, and a cornice with egg-and-dart decoration, and with carvings on each face, including wreaths.	II
Rowley Hall; 52.79472°N 2.12596°W	—	c. 1817	The house was extended in about 1910 and later, and is used for other purposes. It is in stone with a band, a top cornice and blocking course, and slate roofs, and is in Classical style. There are two storeys and a symmetrical front of seven bays, the central three bays bowed, and containing a tetrastyle Ionic porch. The windows are sashes. In the left return is a hexastyle colonnade. To the right is a two-storey two-bay range with projecting wings, and further to the right is a range with one storey and an attic and four bays, a Mansard roof, and three pedimented dormers.	II
St George's Hospital; 52.81130°N 2.11439°W		1818	A former mental hospital designed by Joseph Potter, it was extended in 1849–50 and later, and is in Georgian style. It is built in brick with stone dressings on a plaster plinth, and has bands and a hipped slate roof. There are four storeys, a central block of five bays, flanking five-bay ranges, projecting two-bay blocks, further five-bay ranges and later extensions, including a chapel and a water tower. Two curved flights of steps with iron balusters lead up to a central entrance that has a porch with paired Doric columns, a frieze and a cornice, and the doorway has an architrave, a fanlight, a frieze and a cornice on consoles. The windows are sashes, in the ground floor they have round heads, and those in the middle two floors have friezes and cornices. The chapel has a bellcote and lancet windows.	II
Group of six chest tombs and four other monuments 52.79815°N 2.08439°W	—	Early 19th century	The monuments are in the churchyard of Holy Trinity Church, Baswich, and are in limestone and slate. They consist of six chest tombs and four other memorials arranged in four rows. The tombs and memorials commemorate various individuals and family members, and have different designs.	II
Ice house, Green Hall; 52.80268°N 2.11172°W	—	Early 19th century (probable)	The ice house has an ovoid plan. It has a brick-lined shaft and a domed vaulted roof, and is half-buried in a mound of earth.	II
Greenfields, Garden Street; 52.80045°N 2.11232°W	—	c. 1830	The house is in stuccoed brick with wide eaves and a hipped slate roof. There are two storeys, a double depth plan, a symmetrical front of three bays, and a rear single-storey service wing. In the centre is a porch with Doric columns, a Tuscan entablature, and a wrought iron balcony. The windows are sashes, and on the right return is a canted bay window.	II
Stable block north of Greenfields; 52.80059°N 2.11224°W	—	c. 1830	The stable block is in brick with a slate roof, and has a rectangular plan. There is one storey and a loft, and three bays, the middle bay projecting and gabled. It contains elliptical-headed carriage entries, a lunette, and pitching holes.	II
The Hawthorns, 27 Newport Road; 52.80083°N 2.12687°W	—	c. 1830	A brick house with stone dressings, wide eaves, and a slate roof. It is in Georgian style, and has two storeys, a double-depth plan, and a symmetrical front of three bays. Steps lead up to a central doorway that has an architrave and a Tuscan surround. The windows are sashes with wedge lintels. In the right return is a single-storey extension with a bow window, and a conservatory, and on the left return are two gabled wings, and an extension with a round-headed window.	II
Detention block (north), H. M. Prison; 52.81237°N 2.11812°W		1832–33	The prison block was designed by Joseph Potter, and extended and enlarged in 1861–66. It is in brick with stone dressings, modillioned eaves, and a slate roof, and there are massive air shafts with panelled sides. The prison block has three storeys, and a symmetrical plan, with a concave front, and a gable in the middle. Above the central entrance are three round-headed windows that have lintels with decorative keystones, the middle one with a dated pediment.	II
Salt monument 52.79840°N 2.08441°W	—	1837	The monument is in the churchyard of Holy Trinity Church, Baswich, and is to the memory of members of the Salt family. It is in stone, and is a square monument with tracery in the panels, and at the top is a cornice surmounted by an urn.	II
127–131 Newport Road, walls and gate piers 52.80234°N 2.12331°W	—	1837–50	A terrace of five former railway workers' houses in Tudor style. They are in brick with stone dressings and slate roofs. There are two storeys, each house has three bays and a rear wing. The doorways have Tudor arched heads and chamfered stone surrounds. The windows project on brackets and are mullioned casements. Each house has a pair of square stone gate piers with caps. and at the ends of the terrace are brick walls.	II
43 Foregate Street; 52.81264°N 2.12152°W	—	c. 1840	A house, later a shop, it is stuccoed, with a sill band, wide eaves, and a slate roof. There are two storeys, a double depth plan, and three bays. Steps lead up to a round-headed doorway in the left bay that has fluted pilasters, entablature blocks, a fanlight, and an open pediment. The windows are sashes with architraves, friezes, and cornices. The window above the doorway is round-headed, and has Ionic pilasters with palmette decoration. The other windows have flat heads, those in the upper floor have cornices on carved brackets.	II
Detention block (south), H. M. Prison; 52.81113°N 2.11759°W	—	c. 1840	The prison block was designed by Joseph Potter. It is in brick with stone dressings, a modillioned cornice, and a slate roof. There are three storeys and a T-shaped plan, and massive air shafts with panelled sides. Above the entrance are tall three-light pointed windows with moulded arches and cast iron casement windows, and on the centre of the roof is an octagonal lantern with cast iron lights.	II
Former surgery and screen wall, 1 The Green; 52.80310°N 2.11460°W	—	c. 1840	A house, later flats, it is in brick with stuccoed dressings on a plinth, with quoins and a slate roof. There are three storeys, a double depth plan, and a symmetrical front of three bays. The windows are sashes with architraves, and some also have cornices on consoles. The right return and the rear are stuccoed. In the right return is an open timber gabled porch, and at the rear is an embattled parapet, and a curved screen wall around the garden.	II
Gothic Cottage and wall 52.80298°N 2.11332°W		1840–42	A house on a corner site, later used for other purposes, it is in brick, mainly painted, on a plaster plinth, with wide eaves, and a gabled tile roof with decorative bargeboards. It is in Tudor style, and has two storeys, fronts of two bays, and a small rear wing. The windows include a rectangular oriel and a gabled half-dormer. The doorway has a four-centred arched head with carved spandrels and brattishing, and at the rear is a small yard with a boundary wall.	II
Garden ornament, St Joseph's Convent; 52.80104°N 2.10932°W	—	1842–44	The ornament in the garden is in stone, and has been constructed from medieval and later material moved from St Mary's Church during its restoration. It includes a section of wall with an ogee arch and a round arch with coping above, a crow-stepped gable containing a quatrefoil opening, and a lower section of wall containing carved fragments.	II
St Paul's Church; 52.80187°N 2.10939°W		1844	The church was designed by Henry Ward, and the steeple was added in 1887. It is in stone with a tile roof, and has a cruciform plan, consisting of a nave, north and south transepts, a chancel, and a southeast steeple. The steeple has a tower with diagonal buttresses, a cornice with Tudor flower decoration, and a broach spire with a weathercock. The west window has five lights, and the east window has six.	II
Walls and Gates, St Paul's Church; 52.80167°N 2.10969°W	—	1844	Designed by Henry Ward, the walls run along the front of the churchyard for about 35.5 metres (116 ft). They have moulded coping, and contain a pair of chamfered gate piers with caps. The gates are in wrought iron with scrollwork, and above them is an overthrow with a lantern hood.	II
Lych gate, St Mary Castlechurch; 52.79649°N 2.14059°W	—	1846	The lych gate at the entrance to the churchyard is in timber on a stone base, and has a hipped tile roof with gablets, swept eaves, and a finial with a wrought iron cross. It contains a pair of timber gates.	II
1–13 Brunswick Terrace; 52.80109°N 2.12217°W	—	c. 1850	A terrace of 13 houses in Georgian style. They are in brick with stuccoed dressings, wide eaves, and slate roofs. The houses have two storeys and three bays each, and some have rear wings. The doorways have plaster surrounds with pilasters, a fanlight, a frieze, a cornice, and a gabled blocking course. The windows are sashes with wedge lintels, and No. 13 has a two-storey canted bay window.	II
14, 15 and 16 Brunswick Terrace and railings 52.80056°N 2.12142°W	—	c. 1850	A terrace of three houses in Georgian style. They are in brick with stuccoed dressings, wide eaves, and slate roofs. The houses have two storeys and three bays each, and two houses have rear wings. The doorways have plaster surrounds with pilasters, a fanlight, a frieze, a cornice, and a gabled blocking course. The windows are sashes with wedge lintels, No. 14 has two bay windows, and No. 15 has one. Surrounding the front garden of No. 16 are cast iron railings and a gate.	II
16 and 17 Newport Road; 52.80179°N 2.12332°W	—	c. 1850	A pair of houses in Georgian style, built in brick with stuccoed dressings, and hipped slate roofs. There are two storeys, each house has three bays, and there are two rear wings. The central doorways have fanlights, and each is flanked by canted bay windows with friezes and cornices. The other windows are sashes with wedge lintels.	II
19 Newport Road; 52.80164°N 2.12432°W	—	c. 1850	A brick house with stuccoed dressings, on a plinth, with a plinth string course, an eaves frieze, and a hipped slate roof. There are two storeys, a double-depth plan, and three bays. On the front is an open porch with square piers, pilasters, a frieze and a blocking course. The windows are sashes with architraves, those in the ground floor also with aprons. On the right return is a canted bay window.	II
Detention block (northeast), H.M. Prison; 52.81192°N 2.11771°W	—	1852–54	The prison block is in brick with stone dressings, a modillioned cornice, and a slate roof. There are four storeys and a T-shaped plan, and massive air shafts with panelled sides. The wings have gabled centres, and the windows are mullioned and double-transomed, with cast iron frames and arched hoods.	II
Goods shed 52.80054°N 2.11798°W		c. 1860	The goods shed was built for the London and North Western Railway, and has since been used for other purposes. It is in red brick with twin pitched roofs in Welsh slate. At each end are two dentilled pedimented gables and openings below. The west front is blind, on the east front are blocked elliptical-headed openings, and to the left is a lean-to office building.	II
The Chetwynd Centre; 52.80335°N 2.11653°W		1860–62	A grammar school, later an education centre, it was extended and altered in 1888, 1904–05, 1928 and later. The building is in red brick with stone dressings and tile roofs, and is in Gothic Revival style. There are two storeys and attics, and an L-shaped plan, consisting of the original twelve-bay block along Newport Road with a chapel at the south end, a cloister and an outbuilding at the rear, and a library to the north. On the corner is an octagonal assembly hall, and a 20-bay classroom block extends along Friars' Road. Towards the south end is an octagonal three-stage tower with a clock, a leaded spire and a wind vane.	II
St Austin's Church; 52.80034°N 2.11567°W		1862	A Roman Catholic church designed by E. W. Pugin, it is in brick with diapering and stone dressings, and has a tile roof. The church consists of a nave with a clerestory, north and south aisles with east chapels flaking the chancel that has a canted east end, a southeast sacristy, and a northwest tower. The tower has a plain parapet and a short spire with metal cladding. At the west end is a five-light window, and a coped gable with an iron cross. The windows contain Geometrical tracery.	II
Churchyard cross 52.79671°N 2.14076°W	—	Mid to late 19th century	The cross is in the churchyard of St Mary Castlechurch, and is in stone. It consists of three octagonal steps, on which is a high plinth decorated with arcading containing the symbols of the Four Evangelists, crockets, and pinnacles. On the plinth is a tapering shaft with a moulded base, chamfered angles, and Tudor flower decoration. The shaft carries a crucifix on a moulded base, with a brattished gable. On the top step is an inscription.	II
1–8 Lawn Road; 52.79717°N 2.12508°W	—	1868	A terrace of eight houses in red brick, with dressings in polychromic brick and stone, sill bands, a polychromatic frieze band, a modillioned cornice, and a Welsh slate roof. There are two storeys with basements and attics, and most houses have three bays, the outer houses projecting. The porches are recessed and have cornices on brackets and obelisks on the corners. The windows are sashes with polychrome arches, and there are dormers with curved roofs. Some houses have canted bay windows, and some have French windows at the rear with cast iron balustraded balconies.	II
St Leonard's School; 52.79980°N 2.10379°W		1904	The school is in red brick with terracotta dressings and a tile roof, and is in Arts and Crafts style. There is one storey, with the main halls in the centre and branching wings, and the windows have terracotta mullions. Other features include gables, some of which are shaped with decorative cresting, turret porches, and two roof lanterns with lead ogee roofs.	II
Shawms, Radford Rise; 52.79285°N 2.08843°W		1905	A house in Arts and Crafts style, later divided into flats, it is roughcast with stone dressings and tile roofs, partly gabled and partly hipped. There are two storeys and an attic, and eight bays. In the outer bays of the front are gables, and in the centre is a doorway with a curved stone canopy on brackets. The left bay contains a canted bay window, all the windows are mullioned and contain leaded lights, and above the doorway is a three-light dormer.	II
Upmeads and terrace walls 52.79857°N 2.13547°W	—	1908	A house designed by Edgar Wood, it is in brick with stone dressings, a stone-coped parapet and a concrete roof. There are two storeys and an attic, and a double-depth plan. The windows are mullioned, and the terrace has a stone-coped wall.	II*
Old Borough Library; 52.80371°N 2.11513°W		1912	The former library is in red brick with stone dressings and has a roof of slate and felt. There are two storeys and a basement, and a V-shaped plan, with the entrance hall at the point. The entrance has a semicircular porch with two fluted Tuscan columns and pilasters, and an entablature with triglyphs and paterae. Above it is a semi-domed roof with putti holding a crown, a shield and swags. The north range has six bays and the west front has four bays. The windows have stone surrounds and aprons, and above them is a cornice, an inscribed panel, and a parapet with a lattice balustrade.	II
Boundary post, Castle Bank; 52.79638°N 2.14092°W		1917	The boundary post is in cast iron, it has a triangular plan and a chamfered top. On the top are the date and the arms of Stafford Borough, the left side is inscribed "PARISH OF CASTLECHURCH" and the right side "BOROUGH OF STAFFORD".	II
Berkswich War Memorial and enclosure 52.79073°N 2.08414°W		1920	The war memorial stands on a traffic island at a junction, and is in Alton stone. It consists of an octagonal base of three steps, an octagonal plinth, and a cross in the form of a medieval wayside cross. On the plinth are bronze panels with inscriptions and the names of those lost in the two World Wars. Around the memorial is a circular enclosure with sandstone walls.	II
Gateways, The Chetwynd Centre; 52.80344°N 2.11704°W		1928	There are two similar gateways, each with a pair of square gate piers in brown brick with stone dressings. Each pier has a moulded cap and cornice, and between them are arch-topped wrought iron gates.	II
War memorial, The Chetwynd Centre; 52.80337°N 2.11727°W	—	c. 1928	The war memorial stands in front of the building and is in red sandstone. It has a square base of three steps, a panelled pedestal, and a stepped obelisk. There are inscriptions on the face of the pedestal, and on the obelisk are a crest and a sword.	II
Bridge No. 99 (Meadow Bridge); 52.79464°N 2.08963°W		Undated	An accommodation bridge over the Staffordshire and Worcestershire Canal, it is in brick and consists of a single elliptical arch. The bridge has a plain coped parapet, and the abutments end in piers.	II
Bridge No. 100 (Baswich Bridge); 52.79838°N 2.08764°W		Undated	An accommodation bridge over the Staffordshire and Worcestershire Canal, it is in brick with stone dressings, and consists of a single elliptical arch. The bridge has imposts, a hood band, and a plain stone-coped parapet, and the abutments sweep forward.	II
Bridge No. 101 (St Thomas Bridge); 52.80235°N 2.08121°W		Undated	The bridge carries Baswich Lane over the Staffordshire and Worcestershire Canal. It is in brick with stone dressings, and consists of a single elliptical arch. The bridge has imposts, a hood band, and a plain stone-coped parapet.	II
