= Queen Elizabeth Old Grammar School =

Listed building in Middleton, Greater Manchester, England

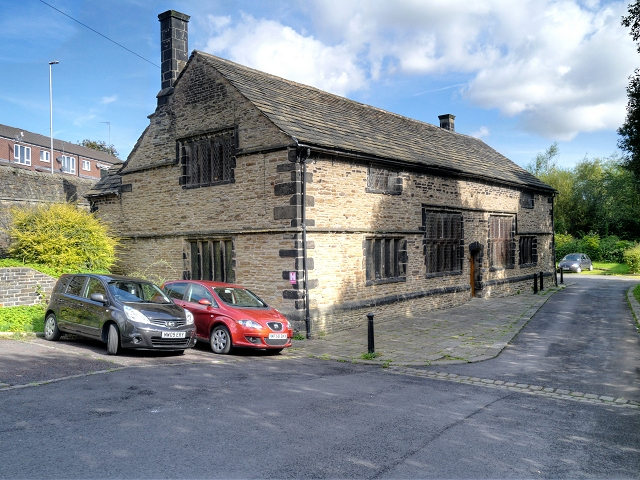
- The building in 2013

- Location within Greater Manchester

General information
- Status: Converted to heritage and community use
- Type: School and schoolmaster's house (former)
- Location: Boarshaw Road, Middleton, Greater Manchester, England
- Coordinates: 53.5537°N 2.1914°W
- Years built: 1586; 440 years ago (school); 1835–1839; 187 years ago (schoolmaster's house)
- Renovated: 1990s (restored)
- Closed: 1902; 124 years ago (as a school)

Website
- oldgrammarschool.com

Listed Building – Grade II*
- Official name: Former Queen Elizabeth Old Grammar School and adjoining schoolmaster's house
- Designated: 15 March 1957
- Reference no.: 1356228

The former Queen Elizabeth Old Grammar School and its adjoining schoolmaster's house are Grade II* listed buildings on Boarshaw Road in Middleton, a town within the Metropolitan Borough of Rochdale, Greater Manchester, England. Dating from the late 16th and early 19th centuries respectively, they were historically part of Lancashire and represent surviving examples of Tudor educational and domestic architecture in North West England. They form part of Middleton's "Golden Cluster" of heritage sites.

The original grammar school building, sold in 1909 after its closure, was later repurposed for community use. Following restoration in 1997 and an acquisition by Rochdale Council in 2024 to protect its heritage, it now functions as a heritage and events venue.

== History ==
The origins of education in Middleton date back to 1412, when Thomas Langley, Bishop of Durham and Lord Chancellor of England, founded a parish school within a chantry at St Leonard's Church. This early foundation provided free Latin education to local boys and was supported by an endowment for the priest to teach children alongside his religious duties.

Following the Reformation, the original chantry school was abolished, and in 1572, the school was refounded as the Free School of Queen Elizabeth through letters patent granted by Elizabeth I, largely due to the efforts of Alexander Nowell, Dean of St Paul's and a former pupil of the original school.

The present building was constructed in 1586, replacing the earlier church-based school. Land was purchased specifically for the school and an adjoining house for the schoolmaster. This marked the transition to a dedicated educational facility in Middleton, which at the time was a rural township rather than an urban settlement.

For centuries, the school provided free education to local boys, maintaining links with Brasenose College, Oxford, which allowed pupils to progress to higher education. By the Victorian era, however, the school had fallen into decline; in 1867, enrolment had dropped to just 34 pupils, and the building was described as "the most woe-begone in all Lancashire" apart from Oldham.

The school closed in 1902, and a new Queen Elizabeth Grammar School was established on Rectory Street in 1910. The original building was sold in 1909 and subsequently repurposed for community uses, including Sunday school sessions, mission services, and later as a venue for the Middleton Operatic and Dramatic Society.

On 15 March 1957, the former grammar school and schoolmaster's house were designated Grade II* listed buildings.

By the mid-20th century, the building had suffered neglect and flood damage. In 1990 ownership returned to the Parish Church Commissioners, and the Old Grammar School Trust was formed. Restoration was completed in 1997, funded by English Heritage and the National Lottery Heritage Fund.

In August 2023, the Old Grammar School was listed for auction and was sold the following month. In November 2024, Rochdale Council acquired the building using delegated emergency powers to prevent its resale at auction and to safeguard its long-term heritage.

Today, the building serves as a heritage and community venue, hosting events such as weddings and cultural activities.

== Architecture ==
The school is built of squared rubble and brick respectively, with graduated stone-slate roofs. The hall is open to the roof, except for first-floor chambers at each end, which served as domestic accommodation for the schoolmaster and an usher. Each chamber includes a small stair wing projecting at the rear. The two-storey schoolmaster's house adjoins the rear of the right stair wing.

The elevation is near-symmetrical, featuring a central Tudor-arched door, a projecting plinth, and stone quoins. The schoolroom is lit at front and rear by two five-light, double-chamfered stone mullion and transom windows, and two four-light mullion windows. The first-floor chambers have smaller three-light mullion windows. All windows retain leaded casements, and a hood mould continues around the entire building. Dressed stone gable chimney stacks with cornices rise at each end, with a four-light window to each floor of each gable. The stair wings project and are gabled, each with a Tudor-arched door.

The schoolmaster's house contains four horizontally sliding sashes on two elevations and a door in the rear gable at first-floor level. Internally, through purlins with wind braces are supported on collar and tie-beam roof trusses. A later gallery links the two chambers. The building is an important early example of a type for which there was little architectural precedent.

== "Golden Cluster" ==
Middleton's "Golden Cluster" refers to a group of historically significant buildings, representing over five centuries of architectural heritage. The cluster includes St Leonard's Church (Grade I), one of the oldest original churches in the Manchester Diocese; Ye Olde Boar's Head, a pub with origins dating to 1622; the former Queen Elizabeth Old Grammar School; and Long Street Methodist Church, designed by architect Edgar Wood, a pioneer of the Arts and Crafts and Art Nouveau movements. Other notable sites include Jubilee Library and several Wood-designed buildings. The Golden Cluster showcases Middleton's links to medieval history, radical reformers, and the Arts and Crafts movement, and is promoted through heritage trails and guided tours.

== See also ==
- Grade II* listed buildings in Greater Manchester
- Listed buildings in Middleton, Greater Manchester
