= Ye Olde Boar's Head =

Listed pub in Middleton, Greater Manchester, England

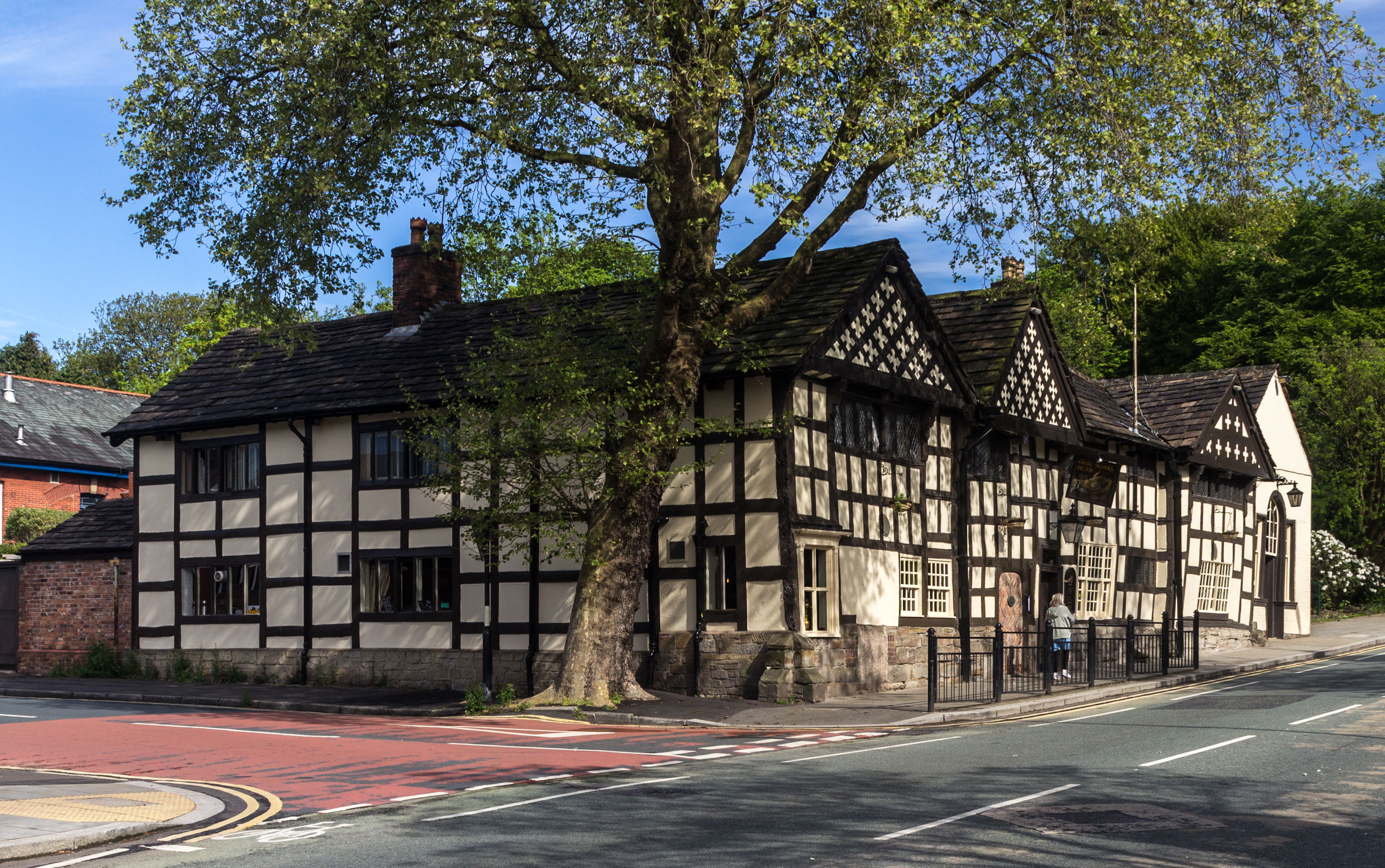
- The pub in 2018

- Location within Greater Manchester
- Alternative names: The Olde Boar's Head

General information
- Type: Public house
- Location: 111 Long Street, Middleton, Greater Manchester, England
- Coordinates: 53.5529°N 2.1969°W
- Year built: 1622; 404 years ago
- Renovated: 1654 (extended); 18th century (added); 19th and 20th centuries (altered and added)

Website
- Official website

Listed Building – Grade II*
- Official name: Ye Olde Boars Head public house
- Designated: 15 March 1957
- Reference no.: 1162256

Ye Olde Boar's Head (also known as The Olde Boar's Head) is a historic public house on Long Street in Middleton, a town within the Metropolitan Borough of Rochdale, Greater Manchester, England. It is designated a Grade II* listed building and has origins dating to 1622. The building is an example of early timber-framed architecture and forms part of Middleton's "Golden Cluster" of heritage sites.

== History ==
The earliest confirmed date for the building is 1622, established through dendrochronology of the timber framing undertaken in 2016. The first recorded tenant was Isaac Walkden, son of Middleton schoolmaster, Robert Walkden. Isaac's will, dated 1623, lists nine beds, 20 chairs or stools, and brewing vessels, indicating that the building was operating as an inn from its inception.

The original structure was commissioned by Sir Ralph Assheton, lord of the manor, who leased it to the rector of Middleton to provide income. It was built on glebe land between the rectory and St Leonard's Church, along the ancient highway between York and Chester.

The building was extended in 1654 using similar timber-framing techniques. A brick-built sessions room was added in the early 19th century, and later extensions provided kitchens and additional rooms. Cottages adjoining the inn were demolished in 1892, and farm buildings connected to the site were removed in 1920.

The name "Boar's Head" likely derives from the Assheton family crest, which featured a white boar. The inn became known as the Old Boar's Head in the 1830s and adopted Ye Olde Boar's Head in the 20th century.

On 15 March 1957, Ye Olde Boar's Head was designated a Grade II* listed building. The building remains in use as a public house operated by J.W. Lees Brewery; the interior comprises nine rooms and snugs.

== Claims to be England's oldest pub ==
The pub states that its building dates from 1622, during the reign of James I. Some sources suggest that a structure existed on the site that year and that it may have been operating as an inn or public house by 1623. If verified, this would place it among the longest-established continuously operating public houses in England.

Another establishment that claims to be England's oldest pub is Ye Olde Trip to Jerusalem in Nottingham. It is traditionally said to have been founded in 1189, although no documentary evidence supports this date. The earliest surviving parts of the present building are generally dated to between 1650 and 1660, and a map by John Speed shows a structure on the site in 1610. There is, however, no clear evidence that the premises were functioning as a public house at that time.

By 1751, the building was recorded as an inn known as The Pilgrim, and it was later purchased by William Standford. The earliest documented use of the name Ye Olde Trip to Jerusalem dates from 1799.

On the basis of surviving records, some commentators have argued that Ye Olde Boar's Head may have been operating as a public house earlier than Ye Olde Trip to Jerusalem, although such claims depend on the interpretation of limited historical evidence.

== Architecture ==
Ye Olde Boar's Head is a timber-framed structure of the box-frame type, rare in Greater Manchester and Lancashire. It stands on a stone plinth to protect the oak frame from damp and consists of five bays arranged over two storeys. The frame includes ten wall and six cross frames, originally assembled off-site and marked with carpenter's assembly marks, which remain visible today.

The building retains decorative timber panelling on its gables, ovolo-moulded mullioned windows, and chamfered beams with ogee stops. The roof is covered with graduated stone slates, and later brick additions include the sessions room with a Venetian window. Internally, the timber-framed structure with diagonal braces and tie-beam roof trusses is largely intact.

== "Golden Cluster" ==
Middleton's "Golden Cluster" refers to a group of historically significant buildings, representing over five centuries of architectural heritage. The cluster includes St Leonard's Church (Grade I), one of the oldest original churches in the Manchester Diocese; Ye Olde Boar's Head; the Queen Elizabeth Old Grammar School (Grade II*), founded in 1586; and Long Street Methodist Church (Grade II*), designed by architect Edgar Wood, a pioneer of the Arts and Crafts and Art Nouveau movements. Other notable sites include Jubilee Library and several Wood-designed buildings. The Golden Cluster showcases Middleton's links to medieval history, radical reformers, and the Arts and Crafts movement, and is promoted through heritage trails and guided tours.

== See also ==
- Grade II* listed buildings in Greater Manchester
- Listed buildings in Middleton, Greater Manchester
- Listed pubs in Greater Manchester
