= St Leonard's Church, Middleton =

Listed church in Greater Manchester, England

Church of St Leonard, Middleton
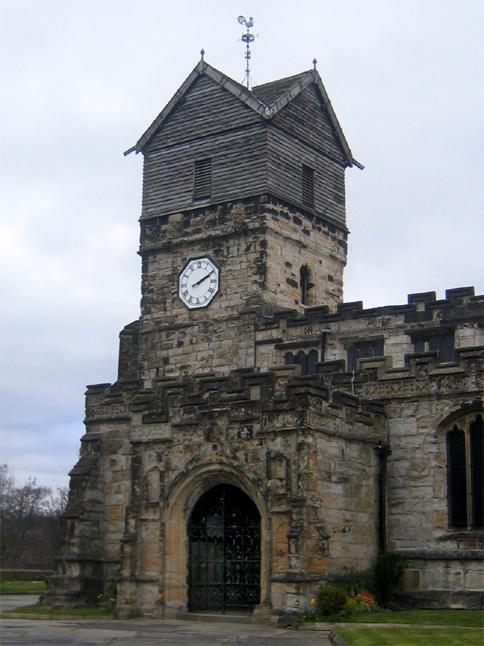

- Location within Greater Manchester
- 53.5532°N 2.1946°W
- OS grid reference: SD 87208 06307
- Location: New Lane, Middleton, Greater Manchester
- Country: England
- Denomination: Church of England
- Website: www.middletonparishchurch.org.uk

History
- Former name: St Cuthbert
- Status: Active
- Founder: Thomas Langley
- Dedication: St Leonard
- Consecrated: September 1412

Architecture
- Functional status: Parish church
- Heritage designation: Grade I listed
- Designated: 15 March 1957
- Years built: 1100, 1412

Administration
- Province: Province of York
- Diocese: Diocese of Manchester
- Archdeaconry: Archdeaconry of Rochdale
- Parish: Joint benefice of St Leonard, Middleton and St John, Thornham

Clergy
- Rector: The Revd Alison Bailie

St Leonard's is a Church of England parish church in Middleton, a town in the Metropolitan Borough of Rochdale, Greater Manchester, England. Historically part of Lancashire, it is recorded in the National Heritage List for England as a Grade I listed building and form part of Middleton's "Golden Cluster" of heritage sites.

== History ==
Much of the present building was erected in 1412 by Thomas Langley (born in Middleton in 1363) who was Bishop of Durham and Lord Chancellor of England. He re-used the Norman doorway from an earlier structure to create the tower arch. Also distinctive in this region is the weather-boarded top stage to the tower.

The church of St Leonard was enlarged in 1524 by Sir Richard Assheton, in celebration of the knighthood granted to him by Henry VIII for his part in the Battle of Flodden in 1513.

On 15 March 1957, St Leonard's was designated as a Grade I listed building.

== Memorials ==
The Flodden Window, in the sanctuary, is thought to be the oldest war memorial in the UK. It commemorates on it the names of the Middleton archers who fought at Flodden. The church also has one of the finest collections of monumental brasses in the north of England, including the only brass in the UK depicting an English Civil War officer in full armour, Major-General Ralph Assheton. George Pace designed a war memorial and, in 1958, added a choir vestry and installed new lighting.

In the extension of the churchyard are the war graves of two First World War soldiers, and an airman from the Second World War.

== "Golden Cluster" ==
Middleton's "Golden Cluster" refers to a group of historically significant buildings, representing over five centuries of architectural heritage. The cluster includes St Leonard's Church; Ye Olde Boar's Head (Grade II*), a pub with origins dating to 1622; the Queen Elizabeth Grammar School (Grade II*), a significant example of Tudor educational and architectural heritage; and Long Street Methodist Church (Grade II*), designed by architect Edgar Wood, a pioneer of the Arts and Crafts and Art Nouveau movements. Other notable sites include Jubilee Library and several Wood-designed buildings. The Golden Cluster showcases Middleton's links to medieval history, radical reformers, and the Arts and Crafts movement, and is promoted through heritage trails and guided tours.

== See also ==
- List of churches in Greater Manchester
- Grade I listed churches in Greater Manchester
- Grade I listed buildings in Greater Manchester
- Listed buildings in Middleton, Greater Manchester
- List of works by George Pace
