= Elm Street School =

Listed building in Greater Manchester, England

- Location within Greater Manchester
- Alternative names: Elm Wood Primary School

General information
- Location: Elm Street, Middleton, Greater Manchester, England
- Coordinates: 53.5500°N 2.1768°W
- Year built: 1908–1910; 116 years ago

Design and construction
- Architects: Edgar Wood and J. Henry Sellers

Website
- elmwoodps.co.uk

Listed Building – Grade II*
- Official name: Elm Street School (County Primary School)
- Designated: 19 September 1969
- Reference no.: 1356229

Elm Street School (now Elm Wood Primary School) is a Grade II* listed building in Middleton, a town within the Metropolitan Borough of Rochdale, Greater Manchester, England. Built between 1908 and 1910, it was designed by Edgar Wood and J. Henry Sellers and is regarded as a landmark of Arts and Crafts and Modernism. Originally a County Primary School under Lancashire County Council, it remains an active community school for children aged 2 to 11, maintained by Rochdale Council.

== History ==
Elm Street School was established during the expansion of public education following the Elementary Education Act 1870, which aimed to provide elementary schooling for all children. Constructed between 1908 and 1910 following lobbying by the Middleton Education Committee, the school served the growing industrial population and operated as a County Primary School under Lancashire County Council.

On 19 September 1969, Elm Street School was designated a Grade II* listed building.

The school is still operating today under the name Elm Wood Primary School, in honour of its designer. The school remains an active community primary school for children aged 2 to 11 and is maintained by Rochdale Council.

== Architects ==
The school was designed by the architectural partnership of Edgar Wood (1860–1935) and J. Henry Sellers (1861–1954), both prominent figures in the Arts and Crafts and early Modernist movements in northern England. Their design departed from the conventional board school style of the period, introducing innovative principles and materials.

Wood was known for blending Arts and Crafts ideals with emerging modernist concepts, while Sellers contributed technical expertise and the use of reinforced concrete and flat roofs. The design is regarded as a significant example of Arts and Crafts modernism and one of the most notable collaborations between Wood and Sellers.

== Architecture ==
The school is constructed of brick with stone dressings and concrete roofs. At its centre is a nine-bay hall flanked by towers, with cloisters extending forward to meet Elm Street on either side, originally serving separate entrances for boys and girls. These cloisters enclose a formal garden and a suite of offices with a concave single-storey façade. Parallel classroom ranges extend beyond the cloisters, with an additional long range adjoining the hall at the rear, forming a compact, symmetrical plan.

The hall has nine round-arched windows with impost blocks and keystones on both the front and rear elevations. A hipped roof sits behind a coped parapet, stepped above recessed brick panels repeated throughout the design. The towers at each end have stone upper stages and are prominent visual elements. The cloisters include cross-vaulted passages with rusticated segmental arches and banded pilasters; some arches have been infilled, and only one set of original cast-iron gates survives. The office frontage incorporates flat-faced stone-mullioned windows flanking central double doors, though many original leaded casements have been removed. The classroom ranges have segmental-arched windows with stone sills and advanced bays with higher parapets. Small later additions are present on both sides.

Internally, original features remain, including doors and a moulded plaster ceiling in the hall. Contemporary accounts noted that the design incorporated measures intended to improve hygiene in school buildings, and the use of reinforced concrete allowed greater flexibility in planning compared with earlier local examples.

== See also ==
- Grade II* listed buildings in Greater Manchester
- Listed buildings in Middleton, Greater Manchester
