= Richard Assheton of Middleton =

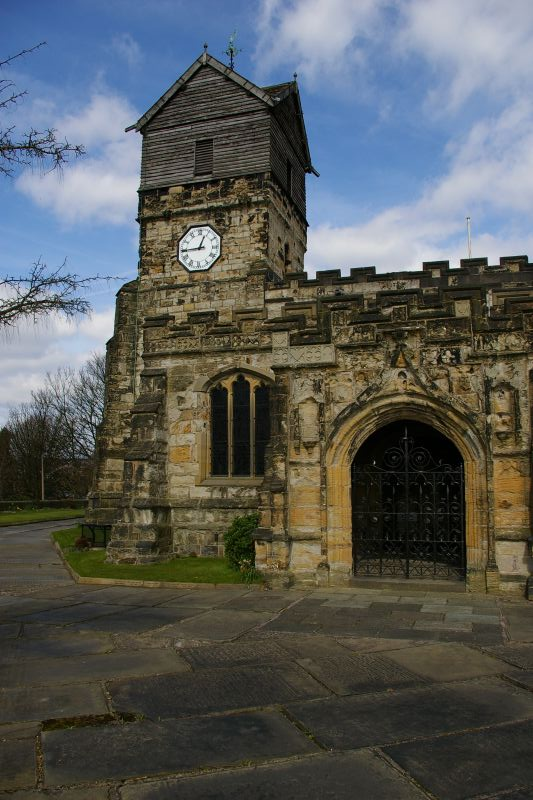
Richard Assheton incorporated a memorial to Flodden in St Leonard's, Middleton

Richard Assheton or Ashton of Middleton (1483–1549) was an English soldier who fought at the battle of Flodden. He is known for rebuilding St. Leonard's Church, Middleton, and for commissioning stained-glass windows there to commemorate that battle. They are one of the oldest war memorials in England.

== Ancestry ==
Richard's grandfather was Sir Ralph Assheton who was knighted by the Duke of Gloucester at the capture of Berwick (1482) and married Margaret Barton, the heiress of Middleton. Richard's father was Sir Richard Assheton (d. 28 April 1507) and mother, Isobel Talbot.

== Flodden and the Flodden windows ==
Richard raised a company of archers to fight at the battle of Flodden in 1513 from Middleton, near Manchester. An heraldic visitation in 1533 by Clarenceux King of Arms Thomas Benolt noted that Richard had captured the courtier John Forman, sergeant porter to James IV of Scotland and Alexander Burnett, Sheriff of Aberdeen, at Flodden. John Forman was taken to Berwick upon Tweed where he identified the body of James IV of Scotland.

Richard continued the rebuilding the parish church of St. Leonard's at Middleton. He commissioned the "Flodden Windows" depicting himself and his wife, and seventeen captains of the archers, and the priest Henry Taylor who blessed them before the battle, commemorating them each by name in stained glass. The windows are one of the oldest war memorials in England, second in date to All Souls College, Oxford, founded in 1438 with the provision that its fellows should pray for those killed in the French wars.

The main inscription on the glass was, as described in 1845; "Orate pro bono statu Richardi Assheton et eorum qui hanc fenestra(m) fieri fecerunt quoru(m) no(m)ina et imagines ut supra ostendatur. Anno d(omi)ni, MCCCCC(X)V", meaning "Pray for the wellbeing of Richard Assheton and those whose names and images they caused to be made in the window shown above, 1515." As there was no "X" in the painted date, it has been argued that the window dates from the decade before Flodden, and commemorates a religious confraternity of archers.

The legible names included; Henricus Taylyer, Richard Kylw (or Wyld), Hughe Chetham, James Gerrarde, John Pylkyngton, Philipe Werburton, William (Ste)le, John Scolefede, Wylliam (—), James Taylier, Roger Blomeley, Crystofer Smythe, Henry Whitaker, Robart Prestwyche, and Richard Bexwicke.

The window is described in a 17th-century poem Iter Lancastrense by Richard James, c.1636;

Now go we to the church of Middleton
To find out there some glory of our own
At charge of those good men who went out far
In suite of brave Ashton to the warre
There stands a painted window, where I weene
The show of their departure may be seene
The Lord and Ladye first in skarlett; then
One neere attending of ye chiefest men
Their garments long, his short and bliew, behinde
The chaplaine of ye warfare you may finde
In robe of ye same colour, for to say
Before an altar praiers of ye daye
On bended knees; him follow neighbours bould
Whoe doe bent bowes on their left shoulders hould
Their girdle sheaft with arrowes; as the squire
So are they all, court mantells in attire
Of blewe; like Greeks in Trojan warre, their haire
In curles long dangling makes ye semblance faire
And sterne; each hath his name, and people tell
That on ye same lands now their children dwell
As yet so called.

Originally there was more than one window, with Richard and his wife shown separately, since 1847 the remaining glass forms one window. The window was restored again in 2012.

== Family ==
Richard married Anne Foulshurst, daughter of Sir Robert Foulshurst of Crewe, their son was Richard Assheton of Middleton who married firstly Anne Strickland, and secondly Anne Lady Bellingham.

The Asshetons of Great Lever, Lancashire were Richard's cousins. Two were members of parliament; Richard Assheton of Whalley and Downham, Lancashire, and his half brother Ralph Assheton of Great Lever at Middleton, who was Member of Parliament for Liverpool in 1553.
