= Chetwynd Centre =

Coordinates: 52.80332°N 2.11705°W

The Chetwynd Centre

Location
- Newport Road; Stafford, Staffordshire, ST16 2HE; England

Information
- Established: 1860
- Age: 16 to 19
- Website: http://www.chetwynd.staffs.sch.uk/

The Chetwynd Centre is an extension of the six Stafford high schools and Stafford College. The Centre provides a range of courses not otherwise offered by the Stafford Collegiate. Students who study at the Centre still belong to their School Sixth Form or Stafford College. The Chetwynd Centre is part of the Stafford Collegiate

The Chetwynd Centre is located in Stafford Town Centre in the old King Edward VI Grammar School building, on the Newport Road which therefore facilitates easy access to both main libraries and close proximity to local businesses/organisations that are useful to students' studies.

The Chetwynd Centre building, the War Memorial at the Chetwynd Centre and the Gates at the Chetwynd Centre are each Grade-II listed structures.

The Chetwynd Centre is now closed and has been offered for sale.

== See also ==
- Listed buildings in Stafford (Outer Area)
