= Long Street Methodist Church =

Listed church in Middleton, Greater Manchester, England

- Arts & Crafts Church
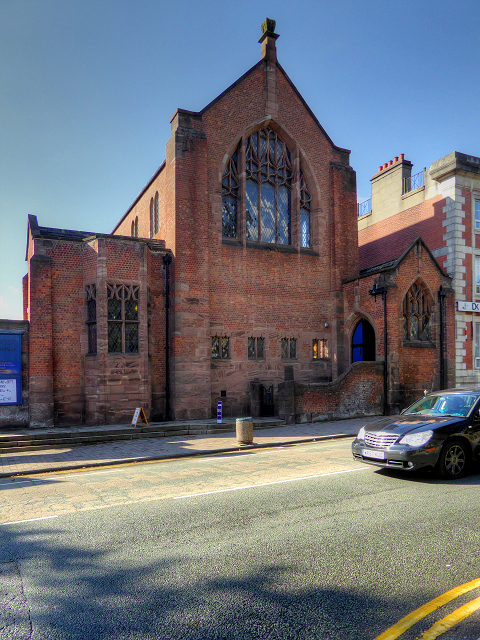
- The church in 2015

- Location in Greater Manchester
- 53.5523°N 2.1971°W
- OS grid reference: SD 87040 06201
- Address: Long Street, Middleton, Greater Manchester
- Country: England
- Denomination: Methodist
- Website: artsandcraftschurch.org

Architecture
- Heritage designation: Grade II*
- Designated: 19 September 1969
- Architect: Edgar Wood
- Architectural type: Church
- Style: Free Gothic, Arts & Crafts, Art Nouveau
- Years built: 1899–1901; 125 years ago

Clergy
- Priest: Rev. Sharon Read

Long Street Methodist Church, also known as the Arts & Crafts Church, is a Methodist church and Sunday school on Long Street in Middleton, a town within the Metropolitan Borough of Rochdale, Greater Manchester, England. Designed by the architect Edgar Wood and completed between 1899 and 1901, it is recorded in the National Heritage List for England as a Grade II* listed building for its architectural and historical significance.

The church forms part of Middleton's "Golden Cluster" of heritage sites. As of 2025, it is included on Historic England's Heritage at Risk Register, rated in poor condition and with no agreed solution.

== History ==
Long Street Methodist Church and school were created as a new chapel and Sunday school for Wood Street Wesleyan Church in Middleton. Previously, the Wesleyans operated a day school and Sunday school in cramped premises on Wood Street, and after the new buildings were completed the church and Sunday school moved to Long Street while the day school took over the Wood Street site.

The 1890 centenary of Wood Street prompted the launch of a one‑year fund to test support for a new chapel and school. Early contributions encouraged progress, and by 1894 a trust had been formed and the Long Street site purchased for £830. Fundraising remained slow, but in 1898 the newly arrived Rev. H. W. Shrewsbury revived the scheme, urging that the church and Sunday school be built together "as originally contemplated." The project soon grew into a Middleton‑wide effort, drawing support from people of all denominations and none, many of whose initials appear on and within the buildings. A substantial loan from the Wesleyan Methodist denomination was also received.

The church, school and lecture hall were designed by the architect Edgar Wood, a leading figure of the Arts and Crafts movement, and were constructed between 1899 and 1901. The complex blends rustic Arts and Crafts forms with Art Nouveau and early modernist elements, and is regarded as one of Wood's most accomplished works. The schoolrooms and garden, now known as the Edgar Wood Rooms, are considered a pure expression of his Arts and Crafts style.

On 19 September 1969, Long Street Methodist Church and Sunday school was designated a Grade II* listed building.

Today, the buildings host worship, heritage open days, exhibitions, and guided tours, and continue to serve as a cultural and architectural landmark within the town.

=== Heritage at Risk Register ===
By the late 20th century the buildings had deteriorated, prompting conservation efforts after the complex passed into the care of the Greater Manchester Building Preservation Trust, supported by the Edgar Wood Society, which has been based on the site since 2011. Restoration work has included roof and fabric repairs, conservation of timber and stonework, and the reinstatement of original interior features, and the school buildings have since been removed from Historic England's Heritage at Risk Register following successful repair. The church building, however, has been included on the register since 2014, its condition assessed as "poor" with "no solution agreed", a status that remains unchanged as of 2025.

== Architecture ==
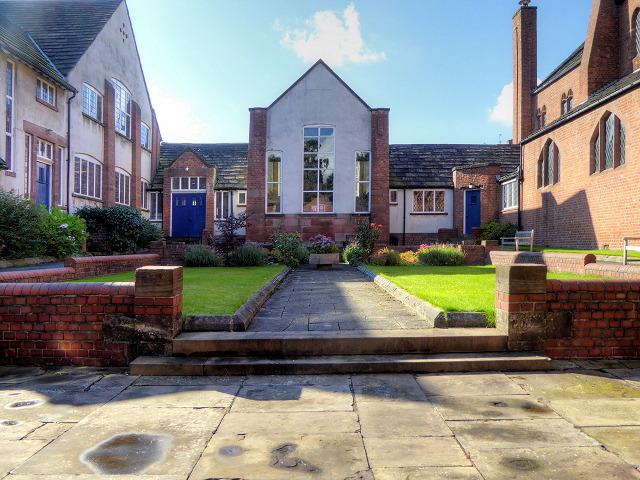
Courtyard garden

The complex is constructed in header‑bond brickwork with sections of render, stone dressings, and a roof of graduated stone‑slate. It is arranged as a compact group of buildings set around a courtyard garden, accessed through arched gateways. The architectural treatment follows a Free Gothic style including Arts and Crafts and Art Nouveau influences. Notable features include the church's west front, which has an ashlar plinth, clasping buttresses, a coped gable, a finial rising above a five‑light window, and original Gothic‑derived tracery.

The building has porches to the left and right, the left porch incorporating a transomed canted bay window. The nave comprises six bays with aisles, which contain three‑light windows, while the clerestory has paired lancet windows. A battered buttress marks the division between the nave and the three‑bay chancel, which includes two‑light windows and a five‑light east window. Cast-iron gates set within stone archways lead to the courtyard, which is enclosed by one and two‑storey buildings featuring coped gables, battered buttresses, leaded casement windows, a canted bay window above the eaves, and original doors.

=== Interior ===
Internally, the building is finished in exposed brick, with the nave carried on octagonal columns that rise directly into chamfered arcade arches. The roof structure alternates between hammerbeam and scissor‑braced trusses.

A prominent feature of the church is the circular stone pulpit, whose attached shafts recall Romanesque column forms and carry a carved frieze of roses and foliage; the book rest above is supported by an angel figure. The font is set on a tapering square base and incorporates a bronze figure by Thomas Stirling Lee on its front face.

Much of the original internal fittings were designed by Wood, including the stalls, pews, doors with stained‑glass panels, and a pair of Art Nouveau sanctuary chairs, along with the kneelers. Later additions include the sanctuary panelling, the organ, and the furnishings of the side chapel.

== "Golden Cluster" ==
Middleton's "Golden Cluster" refers to a group of historically significant buildings representing over five centuries of architectural heritage. The cluster includes the Church of St Leonard (Grade I), with early 15th-century origins; Ye Olde Boar's Head (Grade II*), a pub dating to 1622; the Queen Elizabeth Old Grammar School (Grade II*), a significant example of Tudor educational and architectural heritage; and Long Street Methodist Church. Other notable sites include Jubilee Library and several Wood-designed buildings. The Golden Cluster showcases Middleton's links to medieval history, radical reformers, and the Arts and Crafts movement, and is promoted through heritage trails and guided tours.

== See also ==
- Grade II* listed buildings in Greater Manchester
- Listed buildings in Middleton, Greater Manchester
