= Tonge Hall =

Listed building in Greater Manchester, England

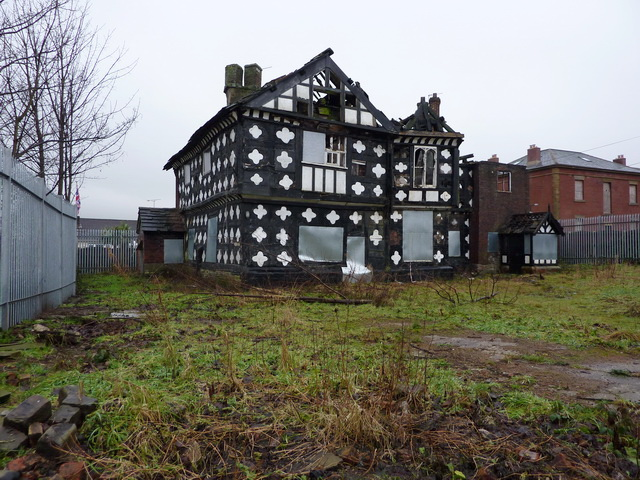
- Tonge Hall in 2010

- Location within Greater Manchester

General information
- Location: Tonge, Middleton, Greater Manchester, England
- Coordinates: 53.54895°N 2.18619°W
- Completed: c. 1584

Design and construction
- Designations

Listed Building – Grade II*
- Official name: Tonge Hall
- Designated: 15 March 1957
- Reference no.: 1068469

Tonge Hall is a Grade II* listed Elizabethan manor house located in Tonge, Middleton, Greater Manchester, England.

== History ==
The manor of Tonge belonged in medieval times to the Tonge family but passed into other hands. The hall was built around 1584 and in 1890 was purchased by Asheton Tonge, a descendant of the original owners. After that the hall was acquired by Albert Wolstencroft, Mayor of Middleton and inherited by his son Captain Norman Wolstencroft. He left the area, leaving the building unoccupied and unprotected. In 2007 it was severely damaged in a suspected arson attack, which destroyed the roof.

Rochdale Borough Council purchased the building from the owner for a nominal sum; in 2014 works were done to stabilise the building. The building has been assessed and repairs have been planned.

In 2023 the hall remained in a derelict state.

As of February 2025, the hall is protected by scaffolding and tarpaulin. Historic England lists it as at "immediate risk of further rapid deterioration or loss of fabric". Although proposals have been made to repurpose the building for residential or community use, no formal plans have been implemented. Restoration costs are estimated at between £1.2 and £1.5 million, with the council continuing to seek funding to secure its future.

== Architecture ==
The hall is the remaining part of a black and white timber and plaster house standing on a low stone base but in an advanced state of decay and dilapidation following years of neglect and an arson attack. It stands on high ground above the valley of the Irk overlooking the town of Middleton.

It consists of the central and eastern wings of a once larger building, two storeys in height, with original timber and plaster construction on the north and east sides. The south and west sides were rebuilt in brick. The exterior timber-work consists of roughly-shaped black-painted beams and posts with square quatrefoil panels. The roofs are covered with grey stone slates with chimney stacks of brick set diagonally on a square base.

== See also ==
- Grade II* listed buildings in Greater Manchester
- Listed buildings in Middleton, Greater Manchester
