= St George's Hospital, Stafford =

St George's Hospital
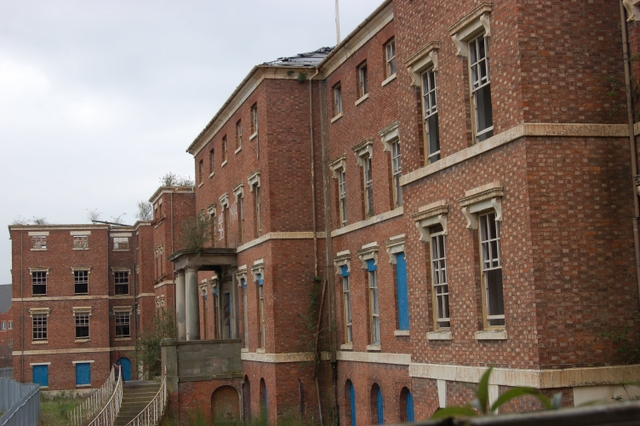
- St George's Hospital

- Shown in Staffordshire

Geography
- Location: Stafford, England
- Coordinates: 52.8117°N 2.1159°W

Organisation
- Care system: NHS
- Type: Specialist

Services
- Speciality: Mental health

History
- Founded: 1818
- Closed: 1995

Links
- Lists: Hospitals in England

St George's Hospital is a mental health facility in Stafford, Staffordshire, England. The main building is no longer in use but survives and is a Grade II listed building.

== History ==
The hospital, which was designed by Joseph Potter using an early corridor layout, opened as the Stafford General Asylum in October 1818. New buildings to the rear of the main structure were completed in 1850. A new female block was added in 1879 and a similar male block was added in 1884. The hospital became Stafford Mental Hospital in the 1920s and joined the National Health Service as St George's Hospital in 1948.

After the introduction of Care in the Community in the early 1980s, the need and desire for huge asylum style hospitals reduced and the main building closed in 1995. It was subsequently converted into apartments as St George's Mansions. The inpatient psychiatric facility was moved next door into more modern units with individual bedrooms and recreational facilities.

== See also ==
- Listed buildings in Stafford (Outer Area)
