= J. Henry Sellers =

British architect and furniture designer

James Henry Sellers (Note: Often credited as J. Henry Sellers or J. H. Sellers, and sometimes referred to as Henry Sellers) (1 November 1861 – 30 January 1954) was a British architect and furniture designer who worked mainly in the north of England. As an architect he is particularly known for innovative buildings in an Early Modern style using reinforced concrete and often featuring a flat roof, although he also worked in other styles. His best-known solo work is the Dronsfield Brothers office in Oldham, Lancashire (1906–8). From the early 1900s, he had a fruitful collaboration with Edgar Wood; their joint works include Dalny Veed in Barley, Hertfordshire (1907) and the Durnford Street and Elm Street Schools in Middleton, Lancashire (1908–10). After Wood left England in around 1922, Sellers returned to a neo-Georgian style, continuing to practise until 1947 or 1948. His output includes private houses, schools, banks, offices and war memorials.

His furniture designs are known for their ornamentation using wood veneer and inlays. Many pieces are in the permanent collection of Manchester Art Gallery.

== Biography ==
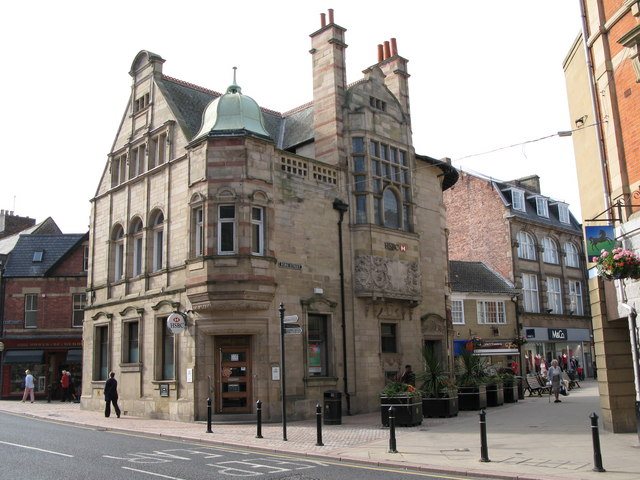
Former Midland Bank, Hexham (c. 1896), an early work while at Oliver and Dodgshun

Sellers was born in 1861 at Longholme, Hall Carr, Rawtenstall in Lancashire to Naomi (née Preston) and Thomas Sellers, who worked in a cotton mill. He attended a local board school in Oldham, after the Sellers had moved to that town, and received no formal training in architecture or design.

After leaving school at fourteen, he was employed by the architect Thomas Boyter in Oldham as an office boy, and later worked in practices in Liverpool, London and Birmingham, rising to assistant architect. He then joined the practice of Walter Green Penty (1852–1902) in York, where he became particularly interested in Georgian and classical styles. From around 1893 until 1899, he was employed by George Dale Oliver (1851–1928) in Carlisle (latterly within the practice of Oliver and Dodgshun); Oliver was Cumberland's county architect, and Sellers also served as the assistant county architect.

He then briefly had a partnership with David Jones in Oldham, before setting up in an office with Edgar Wood (1860–1935) in Manchester in around 1903 to 1905. The pair sometimes worked jointly but also undertook individual projects. The relationship was mutually beneficial with Sellers' technical expertise informing Wood, and Wood's design freedom influencing Sellers. Their joint work tailed off after 1909, when Wood semi-retired from architectural work after his father's death, and particularly after the First World War, but did not cease completely until Wood moved to Italy in around 1922.

Sellers was married to Sarah Mills, who died in 1933. They lived at Bollin Tower in Alderley Edge, Cheshire. His final recorded architectural commission was a 1947 extension to Manchester Crematorium in Chorlton, where Sellers was himself cremated. He retired in that year or the subsequent one, and died at Bollin Tower on 30 January 1954. His character is described by John H. G. Archer as "retiring, bookish, and analytical".

== Architectural works ==
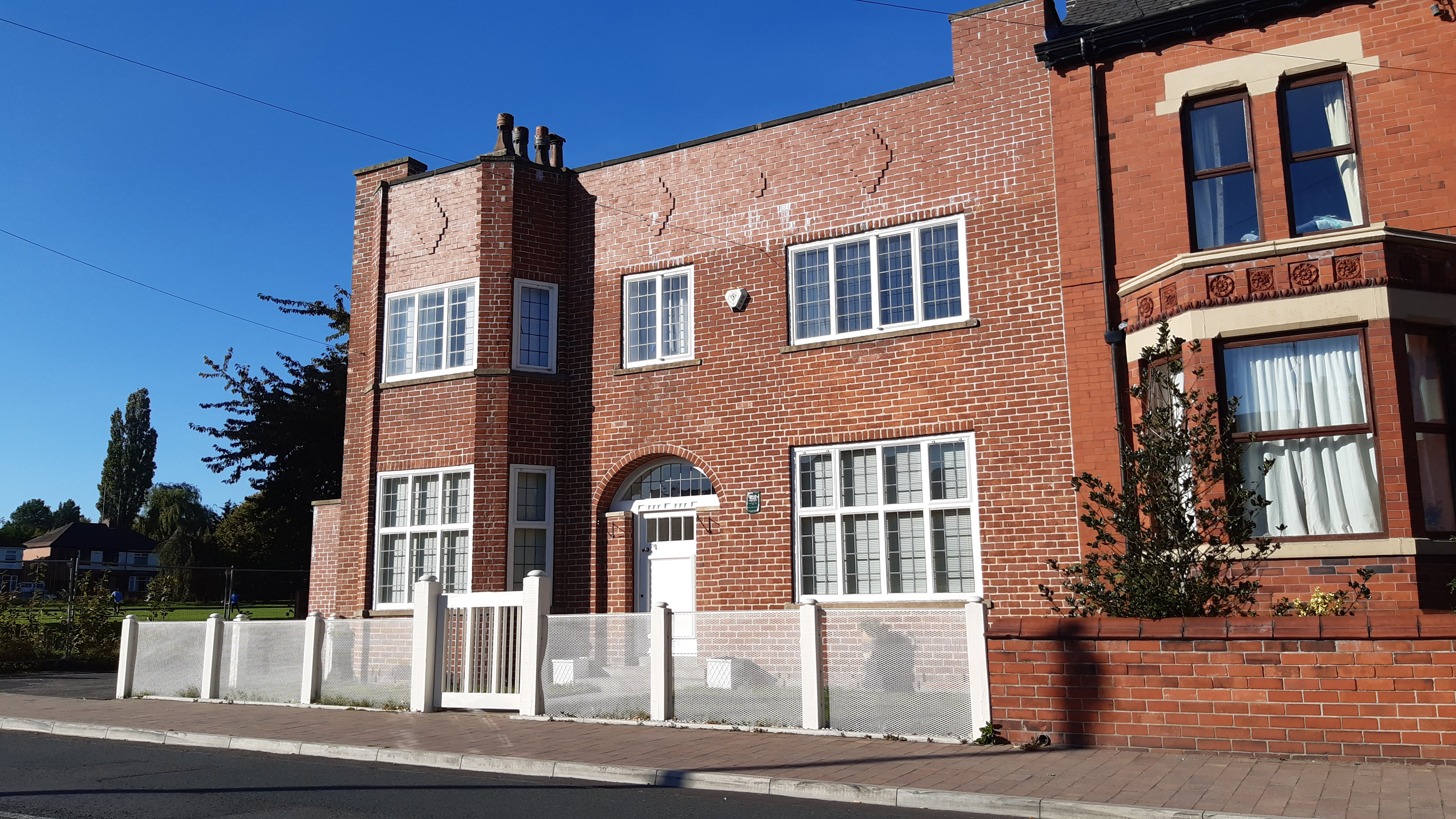
36 Mellalieu Street (1906), the earliest of Wood & Sellers' houses to have a flat concrete roof

The architectural historian Nikolaus Pevsner, in a 1942 article, includes Sellers (as well as Wood) in a selection of nine progressive English designers of the early 20th century. Historic England characterise him as "an important architect" responsible for "some significant Early Modern designs." In an obituary, The Guardian describes him as often being "ahead of his time", and a "pioneer" of buildings with flat roofs. The architect and academic Andrew Crompton describes his work as "sophisticated and abstract", influenced by John Soane, and containing "some of the earliest expressions of Art Deco". Another possible influence is William R. Lethaby, who pioneered the use of concrete in Britain in the early 1900s.

Sellers' early works include financial, educational and industrial buildings; he gained experience during this period at building with reinforced concrete. An early residential work is Kirklinton Park Lodge in Hethersgill (c. 1900). In the partnership with Jones he designed private houses, including a flat-roofed extension which used concrete.

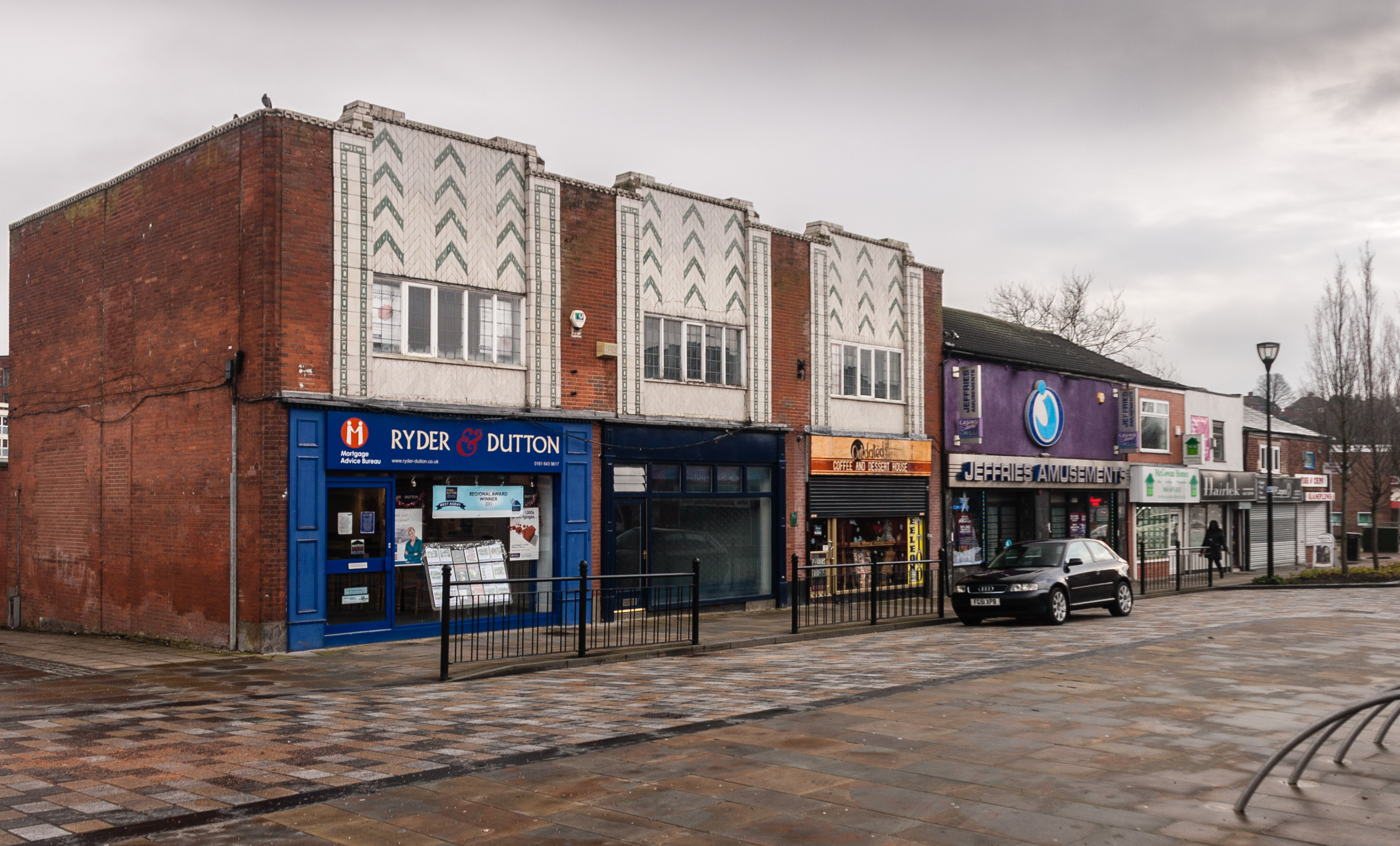
Shops at 33–37 Middleton Gardens (1908)

In the early 20th century, with Wood, he co-designed innovative houses, often with flat concrete roofs. He influenced Wood towards a more-classical style. In addition to residential projects, important joint works include two schools in Middleton, which are among the buildings highlighted by Pevsner in his 1942 article; the architectural historian John H. G. Archer describes them as "remarkable in design, construction, and social provision" for that period. Pevsner considers Sellers to be the leading architect for the two schools. Also in Middleton is a terrace of three shops, which Historic England describe as "extraordinary in its use of the tiled panels", as well as for the flat roof in reinforced concrete. At Rose Hill, Huddersfield, the pair completed a partial interior redecoration, including supplying furniture and chimneypieces; Historic England compare the work with Josef Hoffmann's Stoclet Palace in Brussels (1905) and Adolf Loos's Kärntner Bar in Vienna (1907), describing it as "among the most adventurous in Europe" of its time.

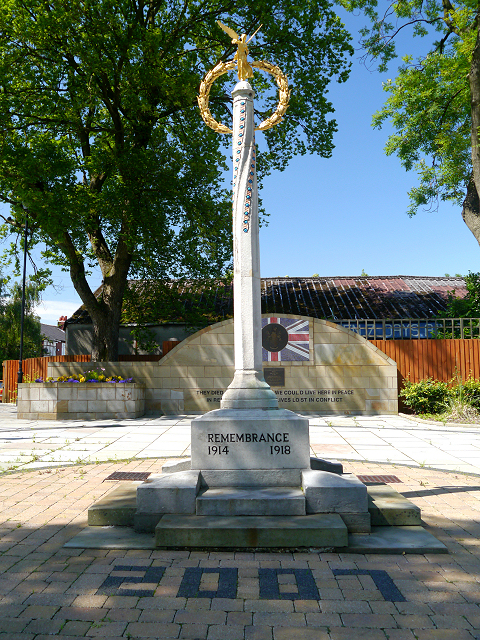
War memorial in Failsworth (1923)

Sellers' individual work after joining Wood includes offices and industrial buildings. The best known is an office for Dronsfield Brothers in Oldham (1906–8), another of the buildings highlighted by Pevsner; it is described by Archer as "masterly, classically simple" and "show[ing] to the full the courage skill and sensibility of its architect". He also designed for the Manchester textile firm Tootal Broadhurst Lee. The later houses designed by Sellers alone are mainly in a neo-Georgian style; they had pitched roofs, possibly because of practical problems that had emerged with realising flat-roof designs. He also designed war memorials, often in association with the Manchester sculptor John Cassidy, with seven recorded between 1920 and 1930.

== Furniture ==
Sellers' early furniture designs represent a "solidly Edwardian interpretation" of 18th-century furniture, according to the academic Stuart Evans, and his personal style did not emerge until he started collaborating with Wood. The approach he then developed was based on late-18th-century furniture, adapted to the contemporary construction methods and materials, as well as the requirements of consumers. In a 1928 lecture he said that furniture designers should strive "to express the aims of our time, our own wants and feelings and thoughts" adding, "We should allow our imagination more play. Our furniture should be expressive of self or individuality".

The Guardian describes Sellers as being of "international repute" as a designer of furniture at the time of his death, commenting on the "intricate detail" of his designs. According to Archer, contemporaries compared his work with that of Edwin Lutyens and Ernest Gimson. Evans characterises Sellers' furniture as demonstrating a "'classic' simplicity" with "original" and "sensitive" details, and "sophisticated" design. His influences include Thomas Sheraton and George Hepplewhite. His pieces frequently have a simple cuboid outline, but sometimes the front or sides are curved, and the fittings are usually very plain. He liked using fine woods such as amboyna, Cuban mahogany and ebony. He generally avoided carving, rather employing ornamental veneers or inlays, sometimes in a highly complex fashion; there might be up to ten different wood veneers combined with inlays of ivory, jade, mother-of-pearl or tortoiseshell. Evans describes his use of veneers and inlays as "masterly", complimenting the "richness of surface without brashness". His designs were different from Wood's furniture, which was often painted.

Sellers did not make any of his own furniture, instead employing specialist craftsmen in the Manchester area. His clients were predominantly wealthy northern businessmen, and his furniture was offered at relatively expensive prices, such as £1,200 in 1932 for a bedroom suite comprising four items.

Many of Sellers' pieces are in the permanent collection of Manchester Art Gallery. Several of his furniture designs were included in The Studio Yearbook of Decorative Art, including a bedroom suite (1906) and fireplaces (1923 and 1924). A design for a fireplace for a gas fire won a prize in the Competition in Industrial Designs of 1929. He also designed tiles for Pilkington's Lancastrian Pottery & Tiles, including a lustre tile used in a mantlepiece that was exhibited at the Franco-British Exhibition of 1908, and featured in the following year's Studio Yearbook.

== Selective list of buildings ==
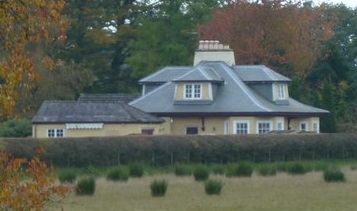
Kirklinton Park Lodge (c. 1900)

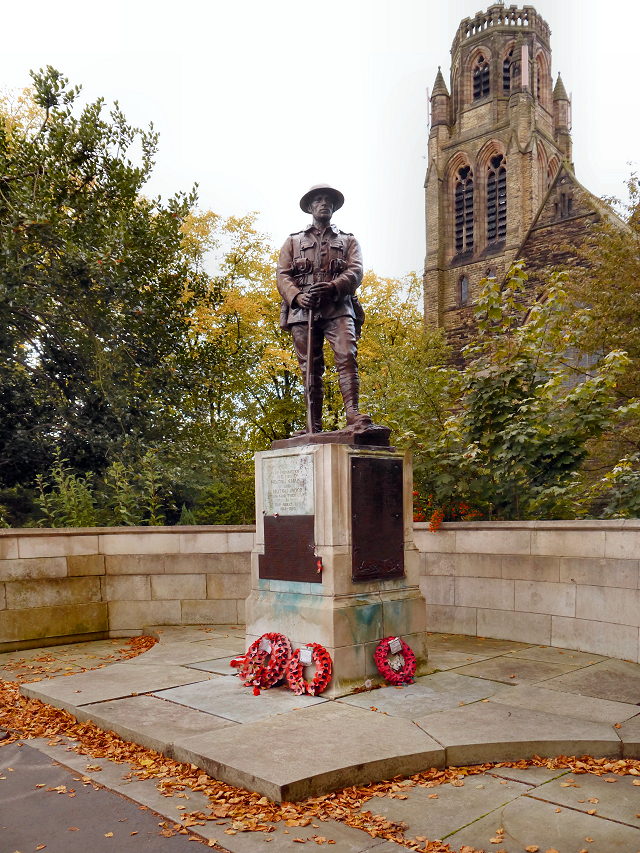
War memorial in Heaton (1921)

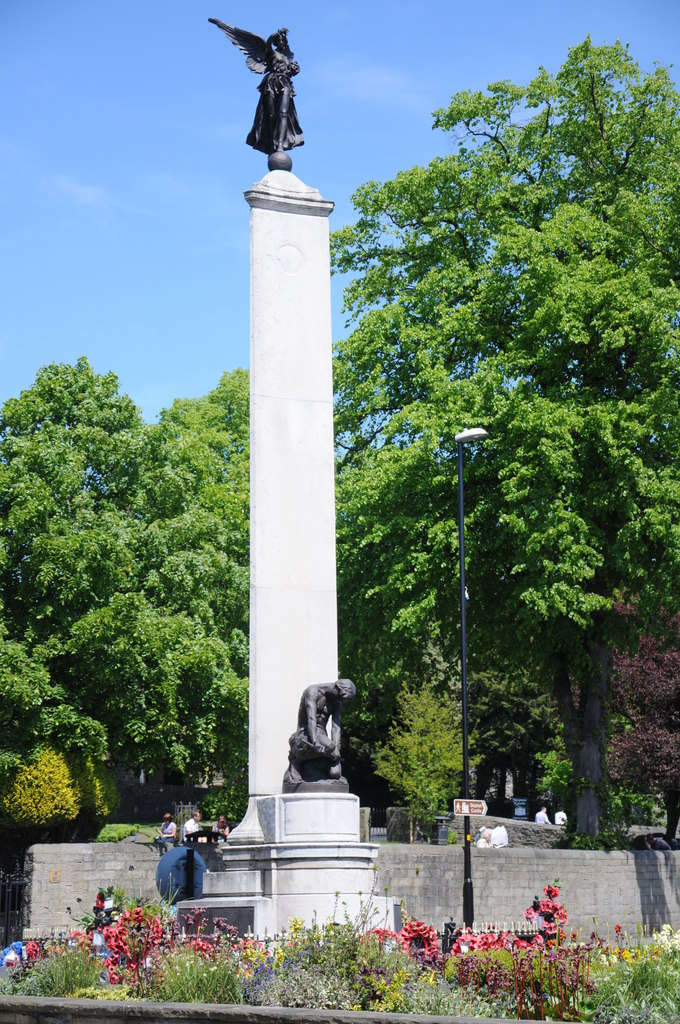
War memorial in Skipton (1922)

- School, Wigton, Cumberland (1895)
- Midland Bank Chambers, Hexham, Northumberland (c. 1896); at Oliver and Dodgshun, and credited in its listing to "G. C. Oliver"; a complex asymmetrical three-storey building featuring a domed turret, oriel window and sandstone frieze (grade II)
- Bank, Cockermouth, Cumberland (1897)
- Kirklinton Park Lodge, Kirklinton, Hethersgill, Cumbria (c. 1900); single-storey sandstone gatelodge (grade II)
- Two houses in Abbey Hills Road, Oldham, Lancashire (1901); with Jones
- Gates at Manor House, Roundthorn Road, Oldham, Lancashire (1901); gate piers finished with scrollwork and ball finials (grade II)
- 36 Mellalieu Street, Middleton, Lancashire (1906); the earliest of the Wood & Sellers' houses to have a flat concrete roof (grade II)
- Dronsfield Brothers office, King Street/Ashton Road, Oldham, Lancashire (1906–8); small two-storey office block faced in polished granite and brick with a green glaze, under a flat concrete roof (grade II)
- Dalny Veed (now Hill House), Bakers Lane, Barley, Hertfordshire (1907); with Wood; large house in Edwardian Free Style with a flat concrete roof (grade II*)
- Three shops, now at 33, 35 and 37 Middleton Gardens, Middleton, Lancashire (1908); with Wood (grade II)
- Durnford Street School, Middleton, Lancashire (1908–10); with Wood; school complex with a flat concrete roof; the infant school survives but the junior and senior school parts of the building were demolished in 2002 (grade II)
- Elm Street School, Middleton, Lancashire (1908–10); with Wood; primary school, including a nine-bay hall with prominent terminal towers, offices with a curved profile, cloisters and classroom ranges, in brick with stone dressings and concrete roofs (grade II*)
- Rose Hill, Birkby Hall Road, Huddersfield, West Yorkshire (1909); with Wood; partial redecoration (grade II*)
- Lydgate Oliver Heywood Memorial Sunday School, New Mill, West Yorkshire (1910); with Wood; small hall in Arts and Crafts style (grade II)
- Royd House, 224 Hale Road, Hale, Cheshire (1914–16): Wood's own house; the outline plans were made by Sellers (grade I)
- Broadway Garden Village, Fairfield (1914–20); with Wood; an extension of the existing Moravian Church settlement. It is in the garden suburb style, with a mix of detached, semi-detached and short terraces of orange and red brick, eventually totalling 39 houses; it includes a square named for Sellers. The architecture is predominantly traditional but with some flat roofs and a linking corner section of a concave shape similar to Royd House
- Blackden Manor, Goostrey, Cheshire (1920); restoration and extension (grade II)
- War Memorial, Heaton Moor Road, Heaton, Stockport (1921); with the sculptor, John Cassidy; semicircular wall and plinth in Portland stone, on a base of sandstone flags, with a bronze statue (grade II)
- War Memorial, High Street, Skipton, North Yorkshire (1922); with the sculptor, John Cassidy; octagonal plinth and tall triangular-section column in white stone with two bronze statues (grade II)
- Manley Knoll, Manley, Cheshire (1922); completion of a house left unfinished when the First World War broke out, as well as interiors (grade II)
- War Memorial, Watchcote Park, Failsworth, Lancashire (1923); an "unusual" design with an octagonal fluted pillar, decorated with coloured tiles and capped with a bronze wreath and winged Victory figure (grade II)
- Lee House, Manchester (1928–31); with Harry S. Fairhurst (also the builder); eight-storey textile warehouse for Tootal Broadhurst in brown brick with stone dressings; in International Style with some Art Deco decoration; intended to be of 27 storeys but truncated, perhaps due to the 1929–31 Depression (grade II)
- Weaving shed, Mutual Mills, Heywood (1930s); two-storey brick building (grade II)
- Birtles Hall, Over Alderley, Cheshire (1938); internal reconstruction after a major fire in a "good but restrained Classical style" (grade II)

== References and notes ==
- Clare Hartwell, Matthew Hyde, Edward Hubbard, Nikolaus Pevsner. Cheshire. The Buildings of England (Yale University Press; 2011) ISBN 978-0-300-17043-6

== Further reading and external links ==
- Partnership in style: Edgar Wood and J. Henry Sellers. (Manchester City Art Galleries; 1978) (exhibition catalogue)
- G. Nixon Aldersley (1967). J. H. Sellers: designer who made no furniture. Woodworker 74 (885)
- John Archer. Edgar Wood and J. Henry Sellers: a decade of partnership and experiment. In Edwardian Architecture and its Origins, pp. 372–384 (Alastair Service, ed.). (The Architectural Press; 1975)
- Nikolaus Pevsner (1942). Nine Swallows – No Summer. The Architectural Review 91 (545): 111
- James Henry Sellers buildings, Dictionary of Greater Manchester Architects, The Victorian Society
- James Henry Sellers items at Manchester Art Gallery
