= Edgar Wood =

English architect (1860–1935)

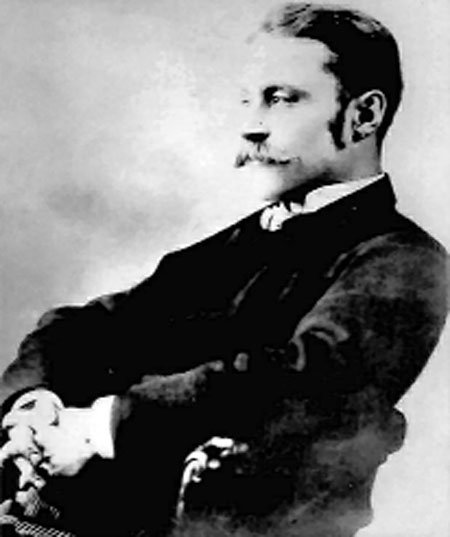
- Edgar Wood
- Born: 17 May 1860; Middleton, Lancashire, England
- Died: 12 October 1935 (aged 75); Port Marizio, Italy
- Occupations: Architect; artist; draftsman
- Design: Arts and Crafts movement

Edgar Wood (17 May 1860 – 12 October 1935) was a British architect, artist, and draftsman who practised from Manchester at the turn of the 20th century and gained a considerable reputation in the United Kingdom. He was regarded as a proponent of the Arts and Crafts movement, which was prevalent between 1860 and 1910.

Wood's work is principally domestic, but he designed several churches and small commercial buildings. He worked as an individual designer, mostly with only one assistant, and confined himself to the smaller type of building that he could control personally. Although he was active in Manchester for over twenty years, most of his work is in nearby towns, such as Rochdale, Oldham and Middleton (of which he was native), and in outlying districts such as Bramhall and Hale.

Wood contributed to Manchester in various ways. He was a founder of the Northern Art Workers' Guild in 1896, one of the major provincial societies within the Arts and Crafts Movement, and was president of the Manchester Society of Architects from 1911 to 1912. Wood retired in 1921 and over twenty of his architectural works are listed.

== Early years ==
Edgar Wood was born in 1860, the sixth of eight children born to Thomas Broadbent Wood and Mary Sykes. Only three of the children lived to adulthood. The family lived in Middleton and Wood's father was a mill owner, a Unitarian, a Liberal, and had a reputation as a strict disciplinarian. Edgar Wood was educated at the local Queen Elizabeth Grammar School.

The direction of Edgar Wood's life after school was a controversial subject in the Wood household. It had been assumed by his father that Edgar would enter the family cotton business but he had different ideas. Edgar's ambition was to be an artist. The difference in opinion was finally resolved in a compromise which saw Edgar agreeing to train as an architect.

== Career ==
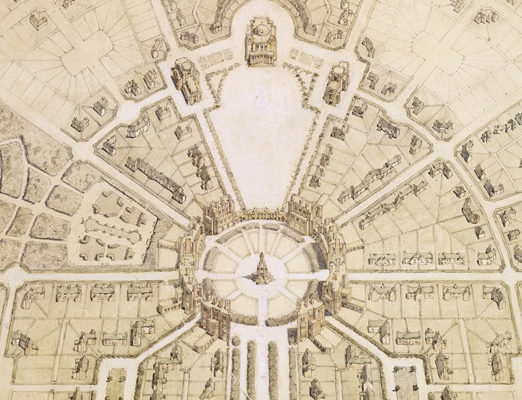
Masterplan for suburban development in Withington in 1909

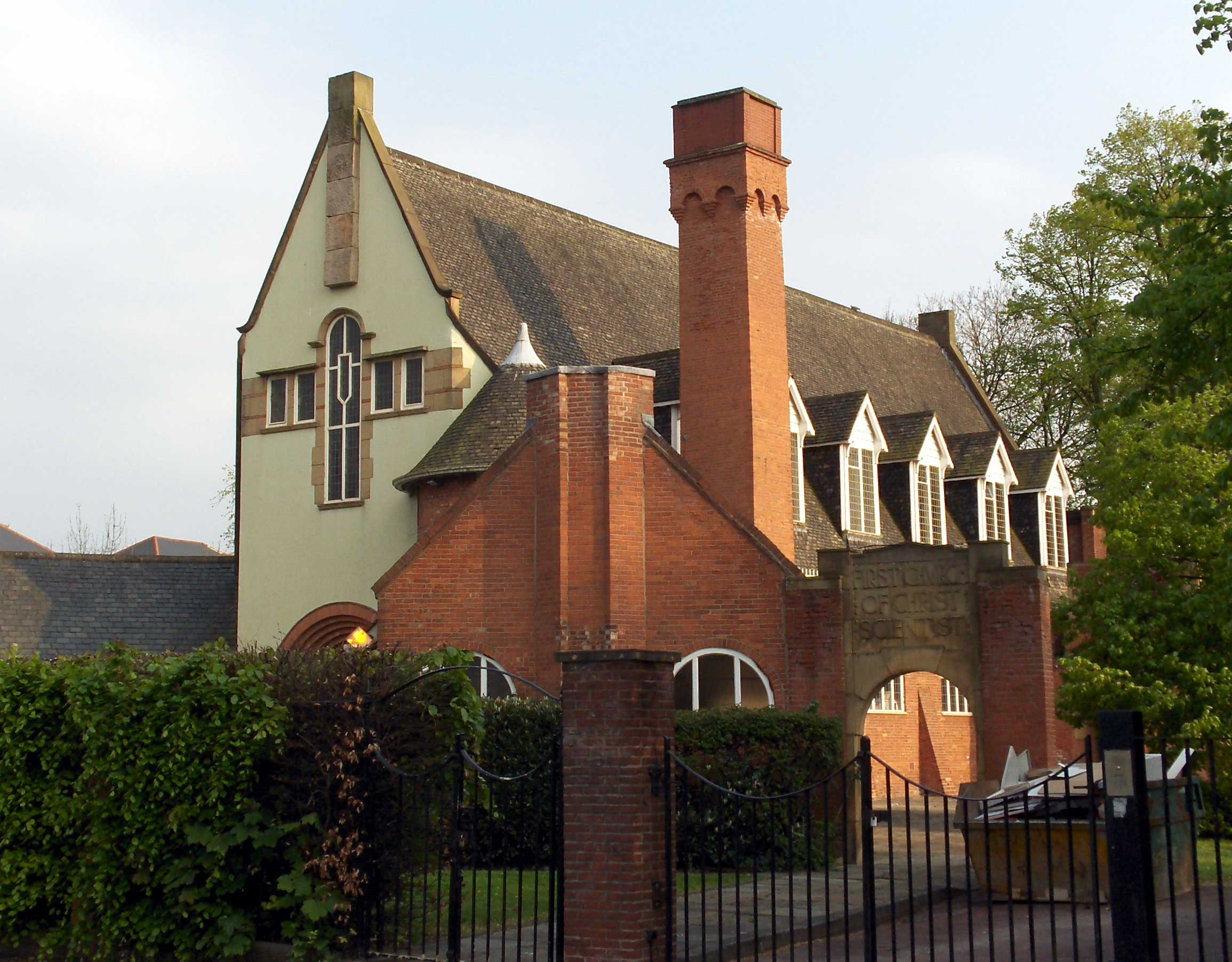
Edgar Wood Centre, Victoria Park, Manchester (1903)

Wood was articled to Mills and Murgatroyd, a Manchester architectural firm responsible for a number of prominent buildings in the Manchester area. Perhaps the best way to judge how Wood felt about his years as a pupil can be gleaned from his own comments in a lecture he delivered in 1900 in Birmingham, "My earliest architectural years were passed in an atmosphere where beautiful creative powers as applied to building, and life in design generally, were drowned in the solemnity of commerce, tracing paper and the checking of quantities."

Wood passed the RIBA qualifying examinations and became an Associate in 1885. He set up his own office in Middleton and his first commission seems to have been for a shelter and drinking fountain (below) paid for by his stepmother and placed in the Middleton market square to commemorate Queen Victoria's Jubilee.

By 1892 it appears that his practice was flourishing and he moved into new premises at 78 Cross Street in the heart of Manchester. Ever the artist he would arrive at work wearing a large black cloak, lined with red silk, a flat, broad-brimmed hat, and brandishing a silver-handled cane. He said, "If an architect is not allowed to advertise his name he must advertise his personality."

John H. G. Archer says of Wood that, "Architecturally, Wood's sympathy lay with the progressive movement of the day, represented first by William Morris and the Arts and Crafts Movement". Wood was a founder member of the Northern Art Worker's Guild and became its Master in 1897. Wood practised in various crafts and he designed furniture, jewellery, and metalwork. Archer adds, "In Wood's architecture the influences of both the Arts and Crafts Movement and Art Nouveau are clearly apparent, the former by his revival of the vernacular traditions of Lancashire and West Riding buildings, and the latter by his use of elongated forms and interwoven motifs."

Wood was instrumental in saving the colonnade of Manchester's first town hall, designed by Francis Goodwin, which stood in King Street and was demolished c. 1911. Wood raised a public appeal and prepared a scheme for the re-erection of the colonnade in Platt Fields park, and when this was rejected he drew up another for a site in Heaton Park where the colonnade now stands.

Wood devised numerous masterplans for the Manchester Corporation. The city was burgeoning by the Edwardian era and needed houses to clear slums. One of his masterplans which was submitted in 1909 included an unorthodox radial suburban plan for Withington which centred on a small village. Wood's masterplan was rejected, but influenced future designs. Numerous housing estates in south Manchester in areas such as Withington and Burnage have houses centred on a radial plan as opposed to straight streets of terraced houses.

== Works ==
Name and location	Image	Built	Grade	Ref. / Notes
Rhodes Schools, Middleton		1884	II	
Temple Street Baptist Church, Middleton		1889	II	
Halecroft, Hale		1890	II*	
Hillcrest and Briarhill, Middleton		1892	II	
Royal Bank of Scotland, Middleton		1892	II	
Silver Street Chapel, Rochdale	—	1893	II	
Barcroft, Rochdale	—	1894	II	
Redcroft and Fencegate, Middleton		1895	II	
Briarcourt, Lindley, West Yorkshire		1895	II	
Norman Terrace, Lindley	—	1898	II	
Old Clergy House, Almondbury	—	1898	II	
31–37 Broad Street, Rochdale		1899	II	
Long Street Methodist Church, Middleton		1899	II*	
51–53 Rochdale Road, Middleton		1900	II	
Gatehouse, Lindley		1900	II	
Homestead, Trafford	—	1901	II	
Banney Royd, Huddersfield	—	1901	I	
Arkholme, 1 Towncroft Avenue, Middleton		1901	II	
Ponsonby and Carlile Office, Oldham	—	1902	II	
Silkstone Hall, Hinderwell, North Yorkshire	—	1902	II	
Lindley Clock Tower, Lindley, West Yorkshire	—	1902	II*	
The Lodge to New Cragg Hall, Cragg Vale, West Yorkshire	—	1902	II	
Azo House, Birkby Lodge Road; Cruden, Birkby Hall Road	—	1903	II	
Parsonage House, Thurlstone	—	1906	II	
Edgar Wood Centre, Manchester		1906	I	
36 Mellalieu Street, Middleton		1906	II	With J. Henry Sellers
Staircase and Exedra, Jubilee Park, Middleton		1906	II	
Hill House (formerly Davnyveed), Barley, Hertfordshire	—	1907	II*	With J. Henry Sellers
22–24 Mount Road, Middleton	—	1907		
33, 35 and 37 Middleton Gardens, Middleton		1908	II	
Upmeads, Stafford		1908	II*	
Elm Street School, Middleton	—	1908–10	II*	With J. Henry Sellers
Former Independent Labour Club, Middleton		1911–12	II	
Royd House, Hale		1916	I	
Edgecroft, Heywood	—	1921	II	
