= Hulme Hall, Manchester =

Hall of residence of the University of Manchester

Coordinates: 53.4571°N 2.2235°W

Hulme Hall
- University of Manchester
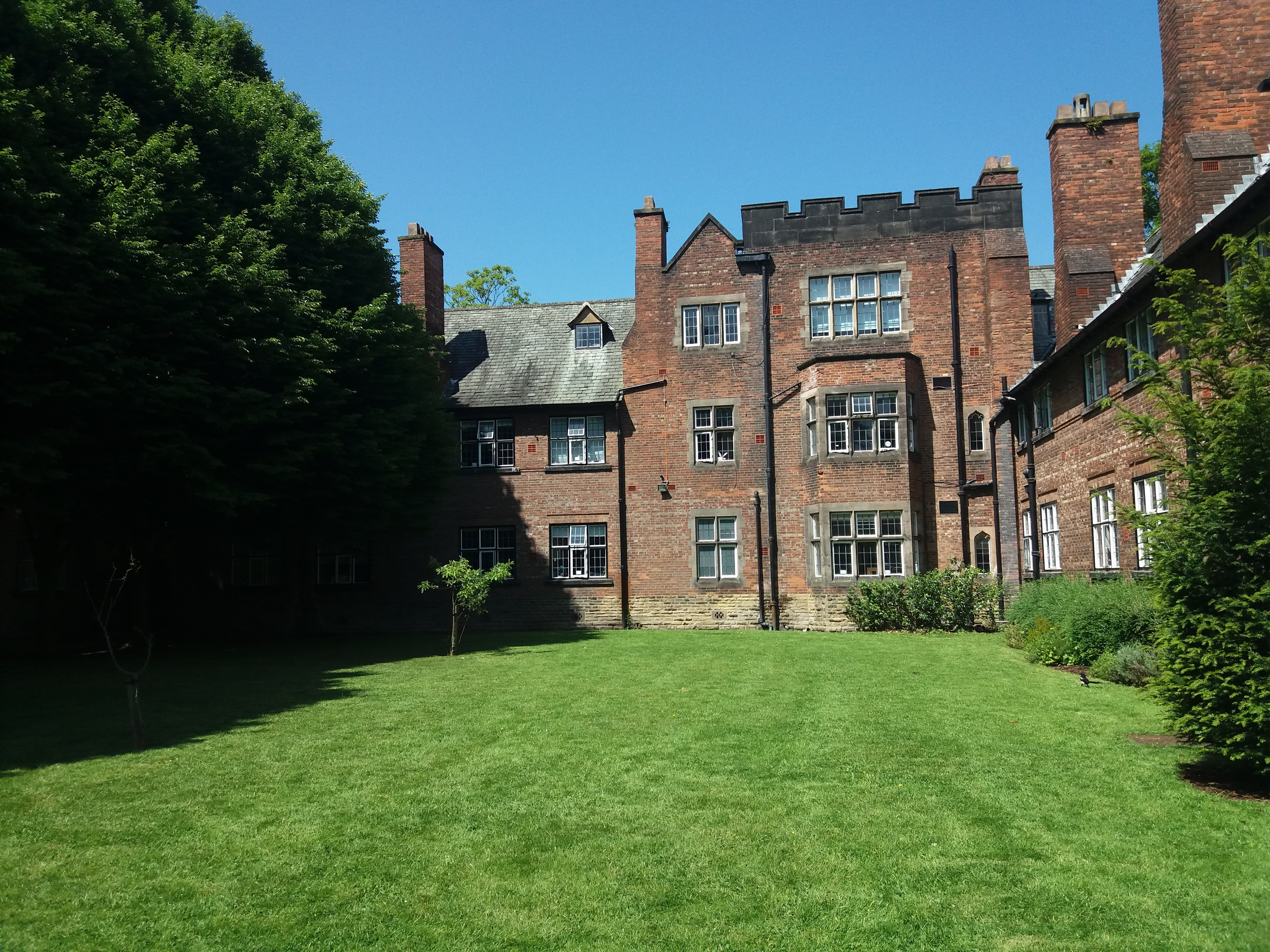
- The tower from the rear quad

- Arms: Barry of eight, Or and Azure, on a canton Gules, a chaplet Argent
- Location: Victoria Park, Manchester, England
- Full name: Hulme Hall and Burkhardt House
- Motto: "Fide Sed Cui Vide" (Latin) "Trust, But Mind Whom"
- Established: 1870; re-opened 1887
- Named for: William Hulme
- ResLife Coordinator: Thomas Goodison
- Chaplain: Currently vacant
- Residents: 323 (+129)
- Website: Official website

Hulme Hall is a traditional hall of residence at the University of Manchester situated at the Victoria Park Campus in Rusholme, Manchester. It houses 300 students and has a range of facilities including the John Hartshorne Centre: a 300 seat lecture theatre with attached seminar rooms; a library; Junior Common Room and study spaces; music room; old dining hall; the Victoria Park bar; and chapel.

The hall is the oldest student accommodation in Manchester, founded in association with Owens College. It was named after the Lancashire lawyer and landowner William Hulme whose Hulme Trust funded the Hall's foundation. It is a Grade II listed building. Along with Dalton-Ellis Hall, Ashburne Hall, St. Anselm Hall, and Woolton Hall, Hulme is one of the five remaining traditional collegiate halls of residence at the University of Manchester.

== History ==
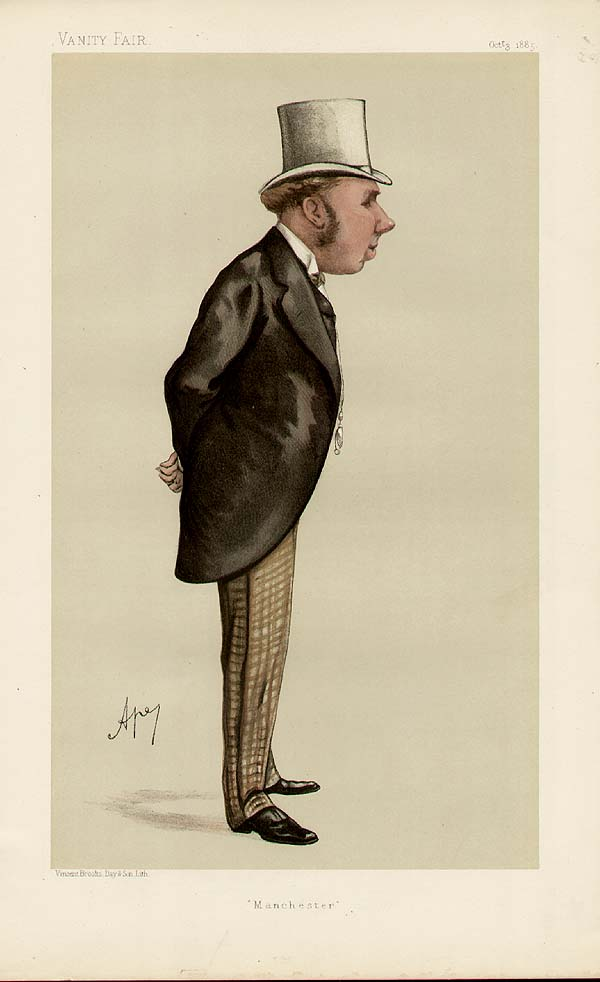
William Houldsworth, founder of Hulme Hall, caricatured by Ape in Vanity Fair, 1885

The present-day University of Manchester has its roots in Owens College. As the academic profile of the college grew, students began coming from outside Manchester, which led to increased need for halls of residence to be attached to the college. These had first been suggested in 1856 to promote discipline, but nothing came of this until 1869, when several meetings were held between figures of Manchester's intellectual and philanthropic class with the end of establishing a Church of England hall of residence. The leaders of this project were Manchester MPs Sir William Houldsworth and Hugh Birley, though they were joined by philanthropist Richard Copley Christie and then president of Owens College Joseph Gouge Greenwood. Today these founders can be found in the names of various accommodation blocks at Hulme Hall. These men appealed to the Hulme Trust, a charity established in 1691 by William Hulme, for assistance; however the trust was unable to provide.

The hall opened at 174 Plymouth Grove in 1870, but was short-lived for financial reasons, and closed in 1876. This was the first hall of residence opened in connection to Owens College, and one of the first outside Oxford and Cambridge in the country. The hall was a private entity separate to the then Owen's College, with funds provided by Sir William Houldsworth, a prominent Manchester businessman, and the Hulme Trust, and was administered by a board of governors. Membership initially was for male students at Owens College, and later the University of Manchester. In 1886 the hall reached an agreement with the Hulme Trust providing £1,000 a year, half of which was to be spent on scholarships, and the hall – now named Hulme Hall – was opened to students.

In 1933 a short history of Hulme Hall's first incarnation was written by then warden Thomas Nicklin, and published by the Oxford University Press.

In the mid-1950s, the University of Manchester announced plans to expand its residential capacity. By the end of the decade many independent halls of residence in Manchester were at risk of folding, and the university gradually assumed responsibility for the upkeep of many halls, including Hulme in 1962. In 1966–1967 work was carried out by Bernard Taylor & Partners to build five new accommodation blocks: Christie (named for Richard Copley Christie, one of the hall's secretaries), Oaklands, Greenwood (named for Joseph Gouge Greenwood, former principal of Owen's College and a member of the hall's original Committee of Management in 1870), Birley (named for Hugh Birley), and Plymouth; along with a new dining hall, bar, and common room. The old warden's lodge, and a number of other buildings around Hulme, were demolished to make space for the new accommodation. The largest of the blocks, Oaklands, consists of four floors of student accommodation. Each floor contains two kitchens, male and female bathrooms and the first floor also contains the Oaklands common room and the "Sky bridge" connection to the Christie block and subsequently to the table tennis and snooker building. Oaklands is at the heart of a structure with a larger number of student rooms than any other building in Hulme Hall. 1968 saw the construction of the chapel, which was designed by the architect JRG Seward, and dedicated on 21 January by the bishop of Manchester. It can seat 150 people and was designed with the idea of drama and musical productions as well as services.

In 1985 Hulme Hall accepted female students for the first time, initially on a trial basis. This proved successful and by the end of the 1980s the hall was officially mixed.

In 1992 Hulme's only self-catered block, Burkhardt House, was constructed, housing an extra 129 students. It is named after George Norman Burkhardt, who was Dean of Science at the university in 1968, and his wife Carol. Burkhardt House proved popular as student residences were increasingly self-catered and ensuite, and over the next decade Hulme Hall's two remaining Victorian villas – Park House and Jubilee House – were closed down.

== Buildings ==
Hulme Hall moved to its present site at Oxford Place in 1907. Following World War I, it first bought Oxford Lodge and Park House in 1919 and then Oaklands (known at the time as the Fielden Demonstration School) in 1926. In 1926 it was the largest island site in Victoria Park, with around eight acres. Expansion in the 1960s demolished most of the Victorian villas and replaced them with modern accommodation blocks. In 1994 further building work added another quadrangle between Burkhardt House and the John Hartshorne Centre. Hulme's buildings are largely arranged in quadrangles set with trees, incorporating a mixture of the original structure, known as Houldsworth, and the newer blocks.

=== Houldsworth ===
Houldsworth
- Interactive map of the Houldsworth area

General information
- Type: hall of residence
- Architectural style: Arts and Crafts with Collegiate Gothic inspiration.
- Classification

Listed Building – Grade II
- Official name: Hulme Hall, Hall of Residence, University of Manchester (Original Portion), Oxford Place
- Designated: 2 October 1974
- Reference no.: 1246448
- Location: Manchester, England, Hulme Hall, Oxford Place, Victoria Park, M14 5PP
- Completed: 1907
- Renovated: 2017
- Owner: University of Manchester (since 1962)

Technical details
- Floor count: 3

Design and construction
- Architect: Percy Worthington

Houldsworth, the oldest part of the Hulme Hall complex of buildings, was constructed in 1907 making an initial 'T' shape and incorporating an existing building as the warden's house, with a later wing added for another 20 students and a chapel. This building is now known as Houldsworth Hall. Hulme was designed by the architect Percy Worthington in the Arts and Crafts style, in red brick with sandstone dressings and green slate roofs. It consists of three wings and two quadrangles. They are mainly in two storeys with paired gables, and most of the windows are mullioned and transomed with casements. The common room in the east wing has two-storey oriel windows, and in an angle is a tower with an embattled parapet and an octagonal stair turret. Houldsworth has larger rooms and kitchens than the more modern blocks of Hulme Hall, and contains the hall library, music room, old dining hall, and the Junior Common Room. Houldsworth was given Grade II listing status in 1974. It saw £1.7 million of refurbishments in 2017 which included new furnishings and interior fittings, as well as renovations to the structure of the building itself.

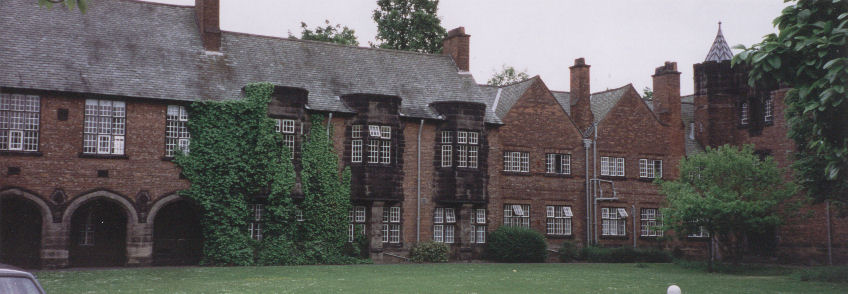
The Houldsworth block. The large windows above the cloister to the left are those of the old dining hall, the oriel windows are the JCR, below which is the hall music room. Visible on the right is the tower, which formerly housed the library, and then the SCR from 1967 into the 21st century.

=== The Chapel ===
The Hulme Hall Chapel appears in Pevsner Architectural Guides of England. It is constructed in a whorl shape with a deliberately ecumenical design. At the bequest of the William Greer, Bishop of Manchester, the east window frames a view of a beech tree, as he said that, "a view of nature was infinitely preferable to the art of man".

== Student life ==
Local student attractions to Hulme Hall include the Whitworth Art Gallery and the Curry Mile on Wilmslow Road.

=== Sport ===
Hulme Hall has long had a strong sporting tradition, regularly winning the Stopford Cup and Behrens Cup, for men's and women's inter-hall sports at the University of Manchester respectively. The main hall sport throughout the early and mid-20th century was fives, however this was replaced by squash in 1967, the popularity of which has since declined. Hulme Hall students regularly represent both the hall and the university in a wide range of sports.

Hulme Hall offers students a multi use games area, a squash court, and a gym.

=== The Victoria Park Bar ===
Since 1966 the Victoria Park Bar has been the epicentre of social life at the University of Manchester's Victoria Park campus. It was opened as the Hulme Hall Bar, initially for only two nights a week. In 1973 it first made a large enough profit to be registered for VAT. The bar was historically run by the Buttery Club, however is now operated by the university's Bars on Campus. In 2016 it was renamed the Victoria Park Bar. There is a weekly quiz night on Thursdays, and events run by the ResLife Team are regularly held in the bar.

=== Formal Hall ===
Hulme Hall is one of a few traditional halls of residence at the University of Manchester which hold formal hall. Formal hall takes place twice a semester. At formals, all students sit to dinner together, and food is served to tables by catering staff rather than the usual refectory service. Speeches are generally made by a member of the ResLife team between the end of the main course and the serving of pudding.

== Gallery ==
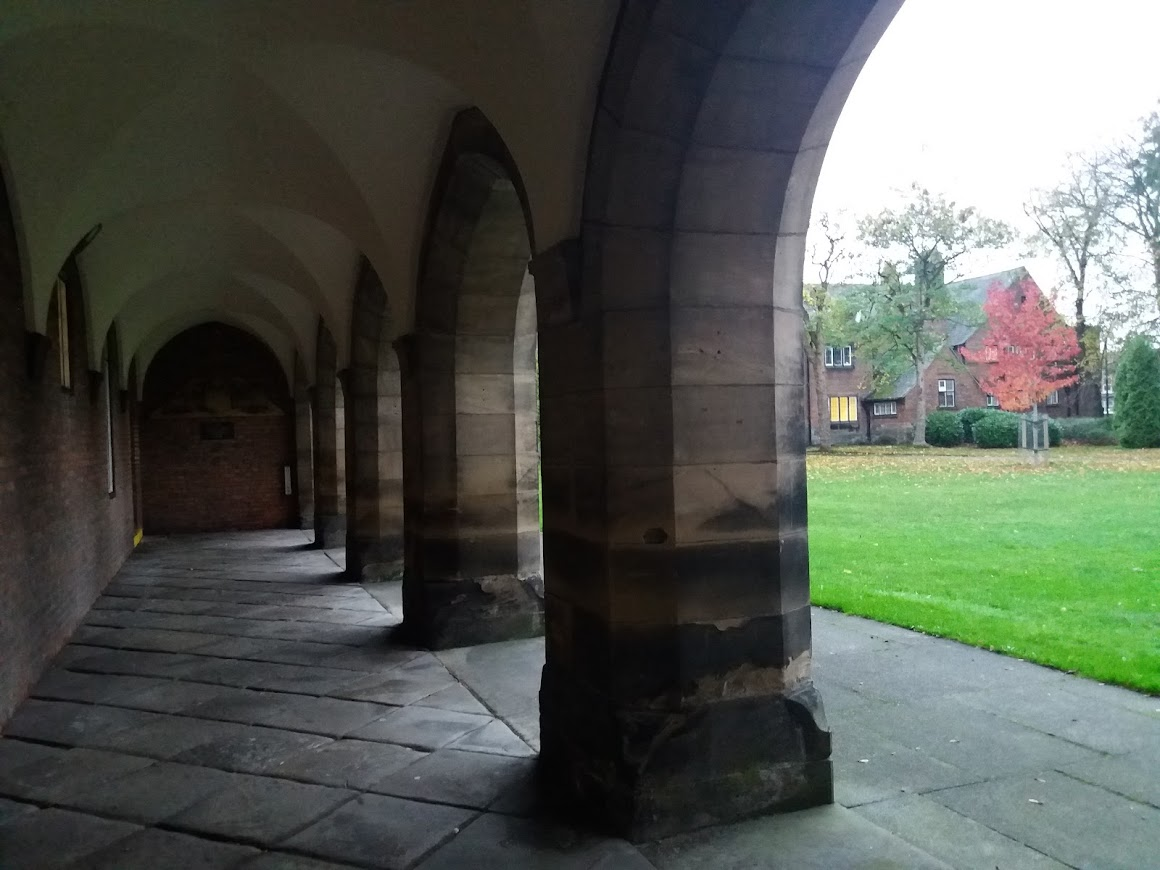
The old cloister

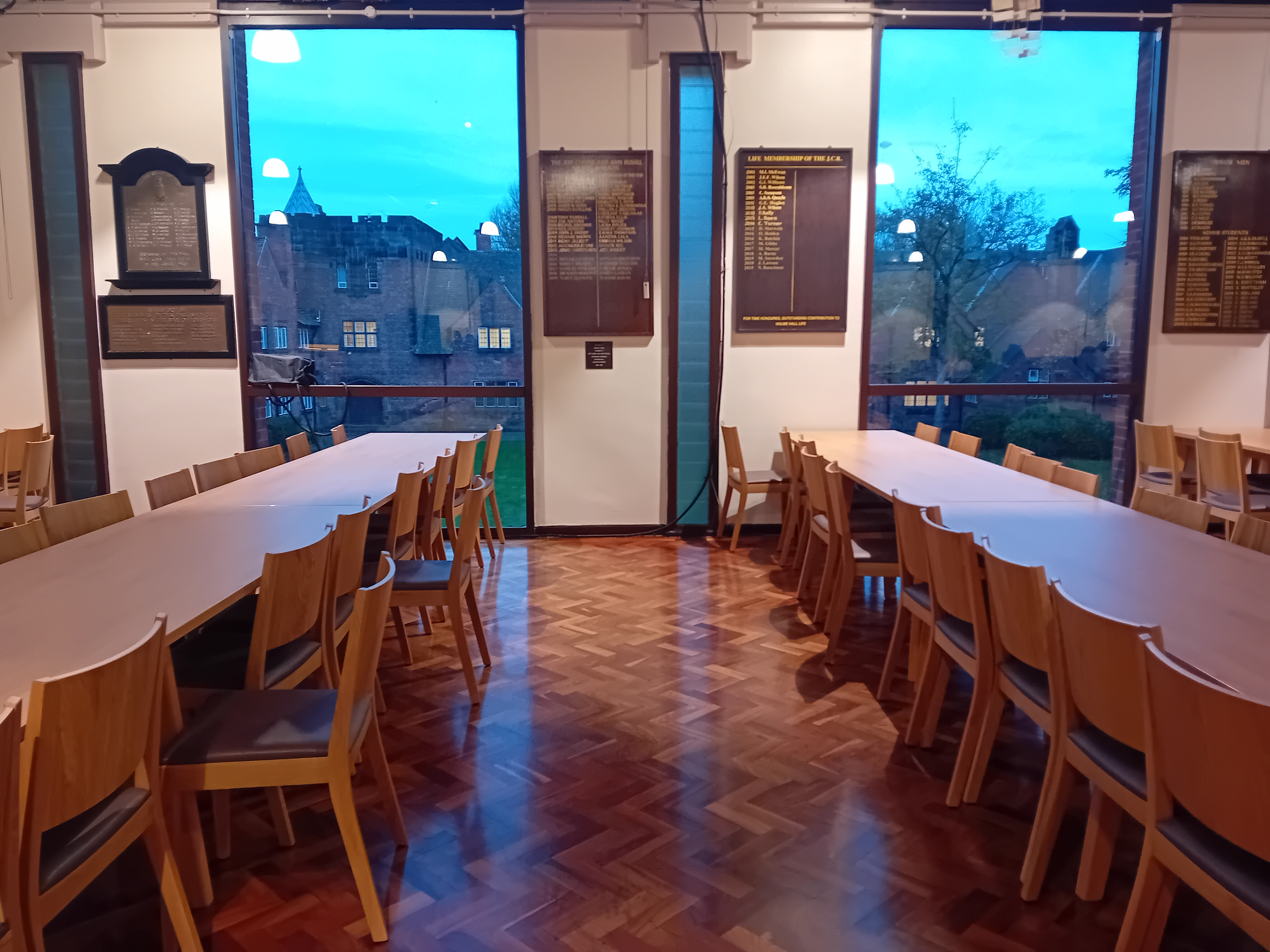
The dining hall

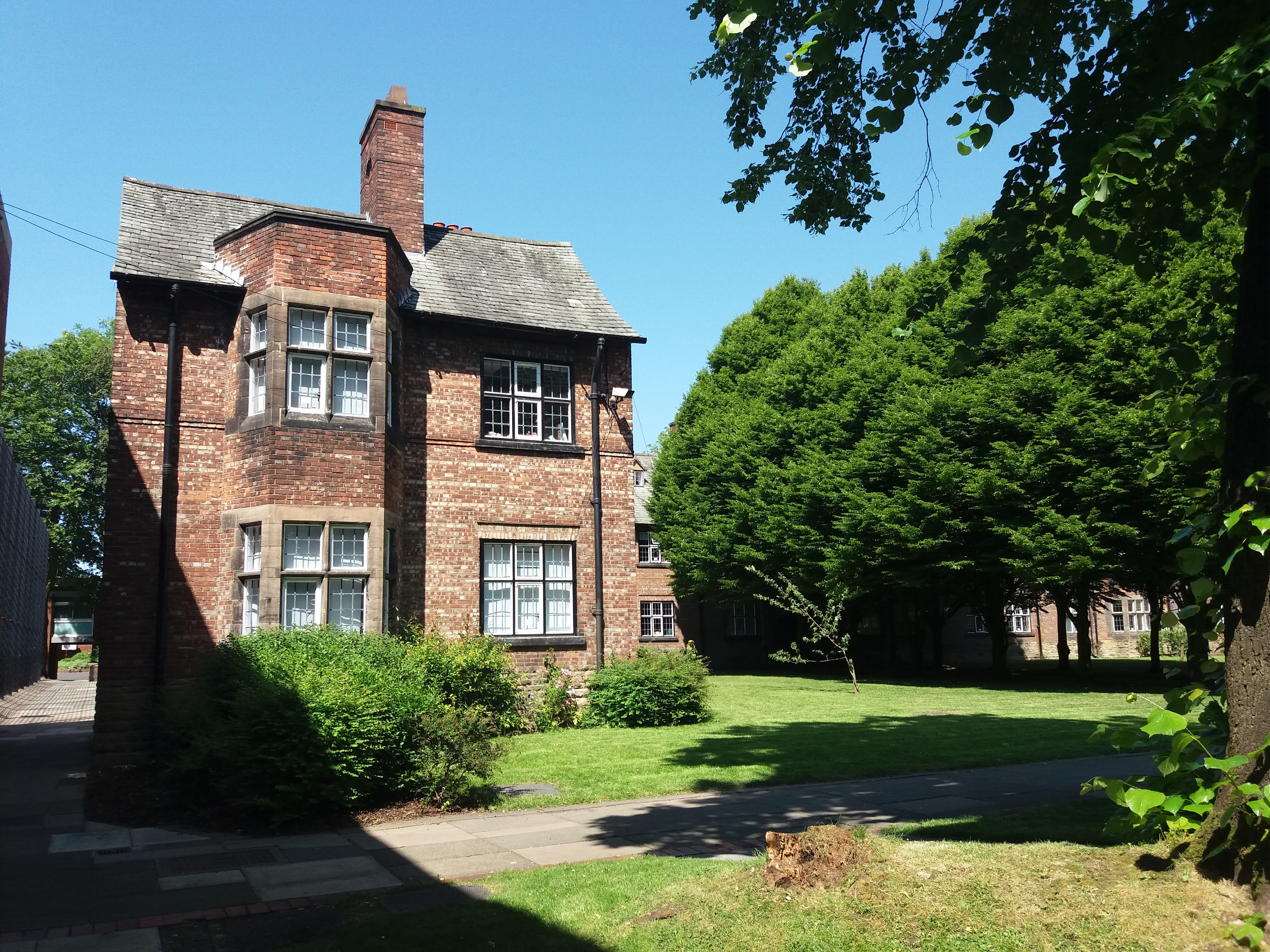
The Rear Quad

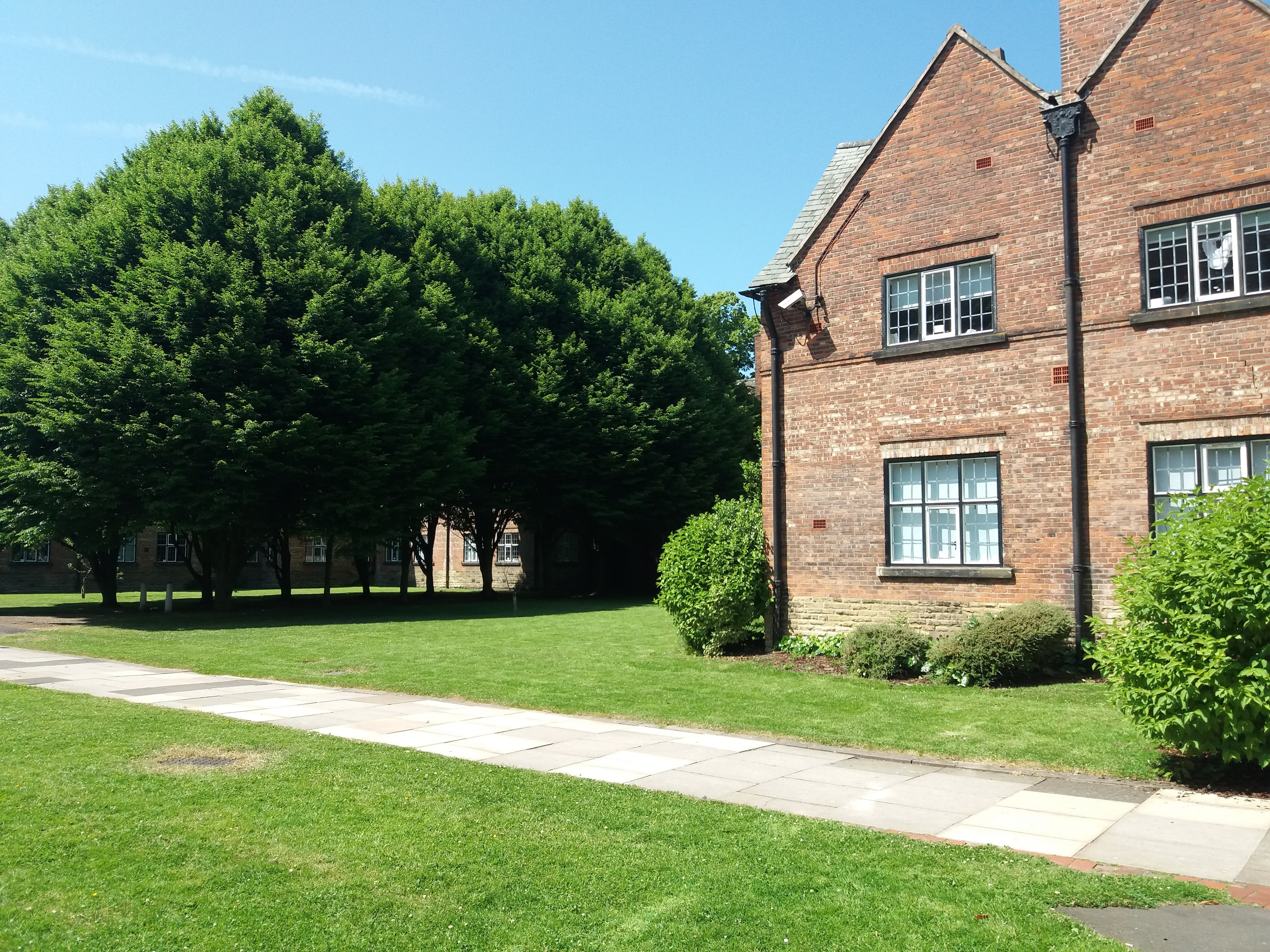
The Rear Quad

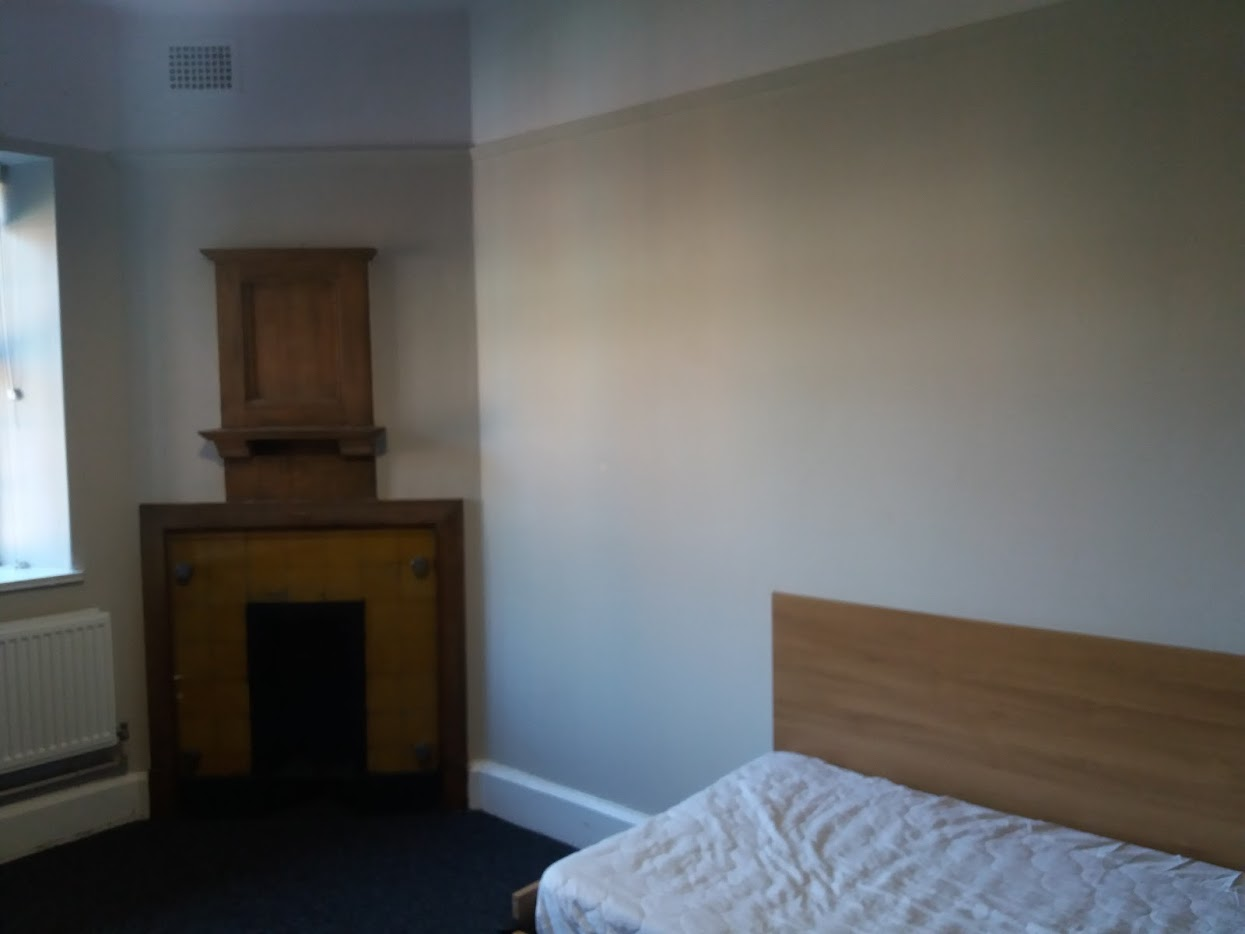
A room in Houldsworth

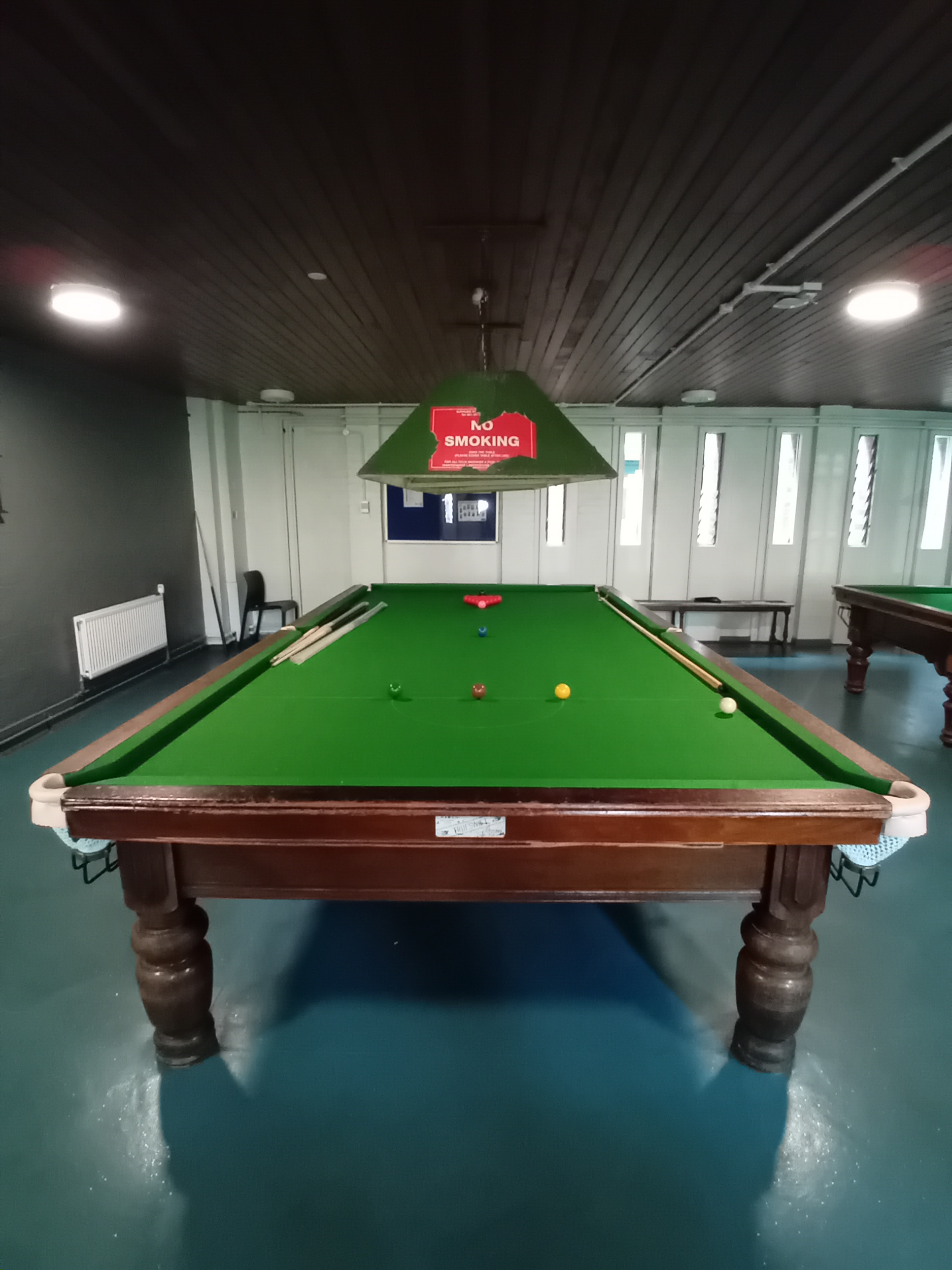
The Snooker Room

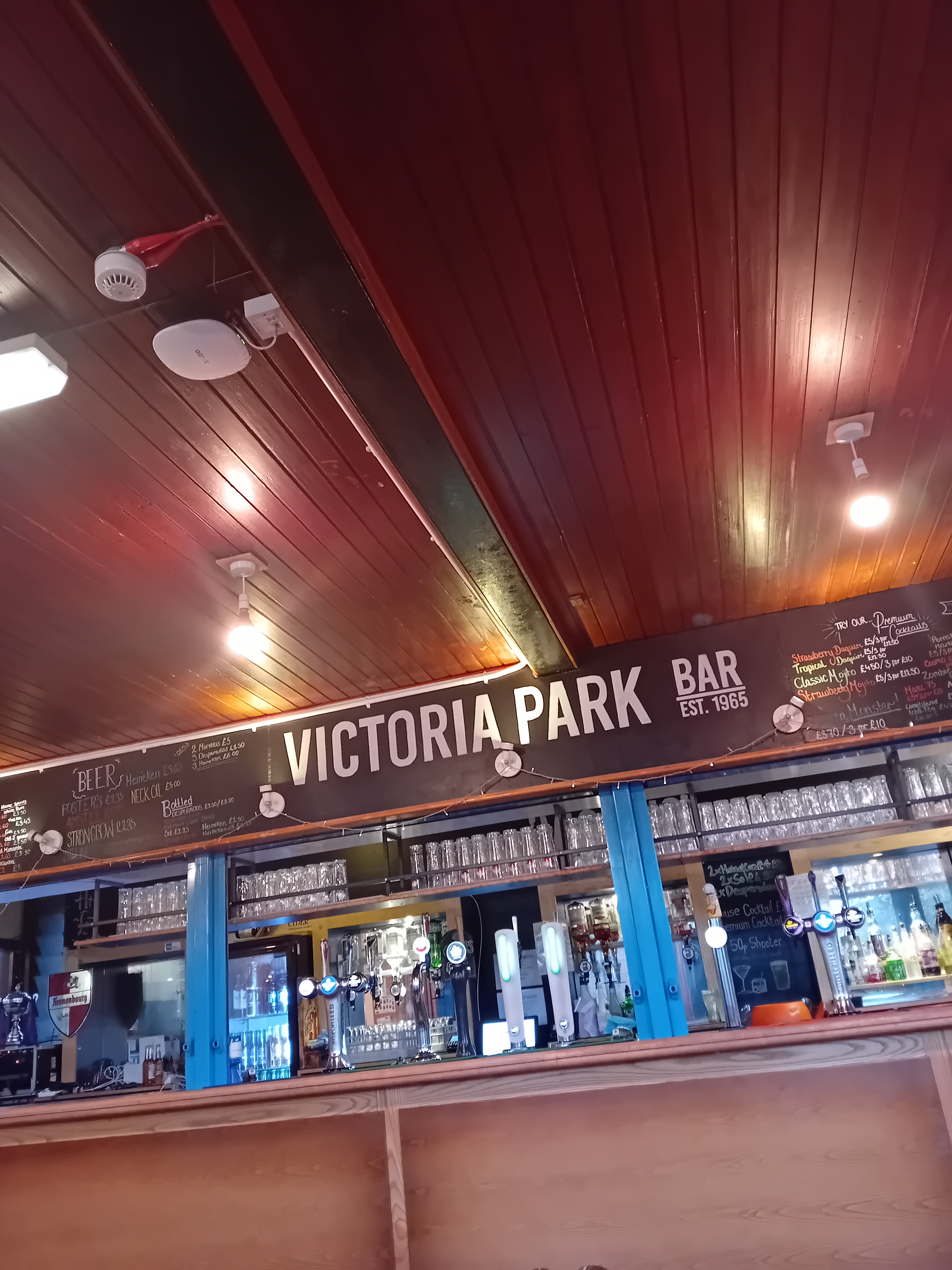
The Victoria Park Bar

== People associated with the Hall ==
=== Founders ===
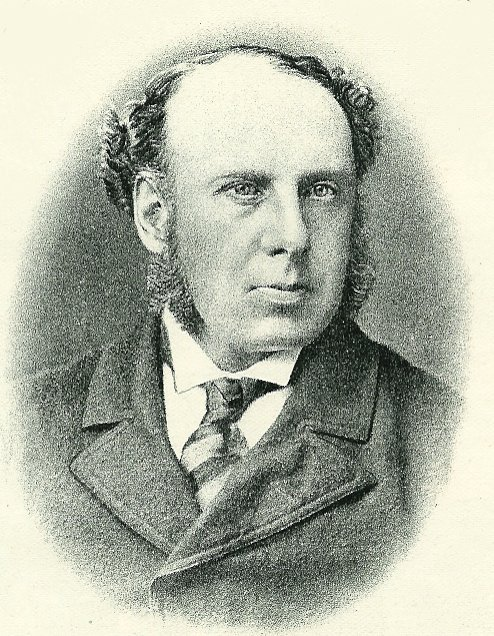
William Henry Houldsworth

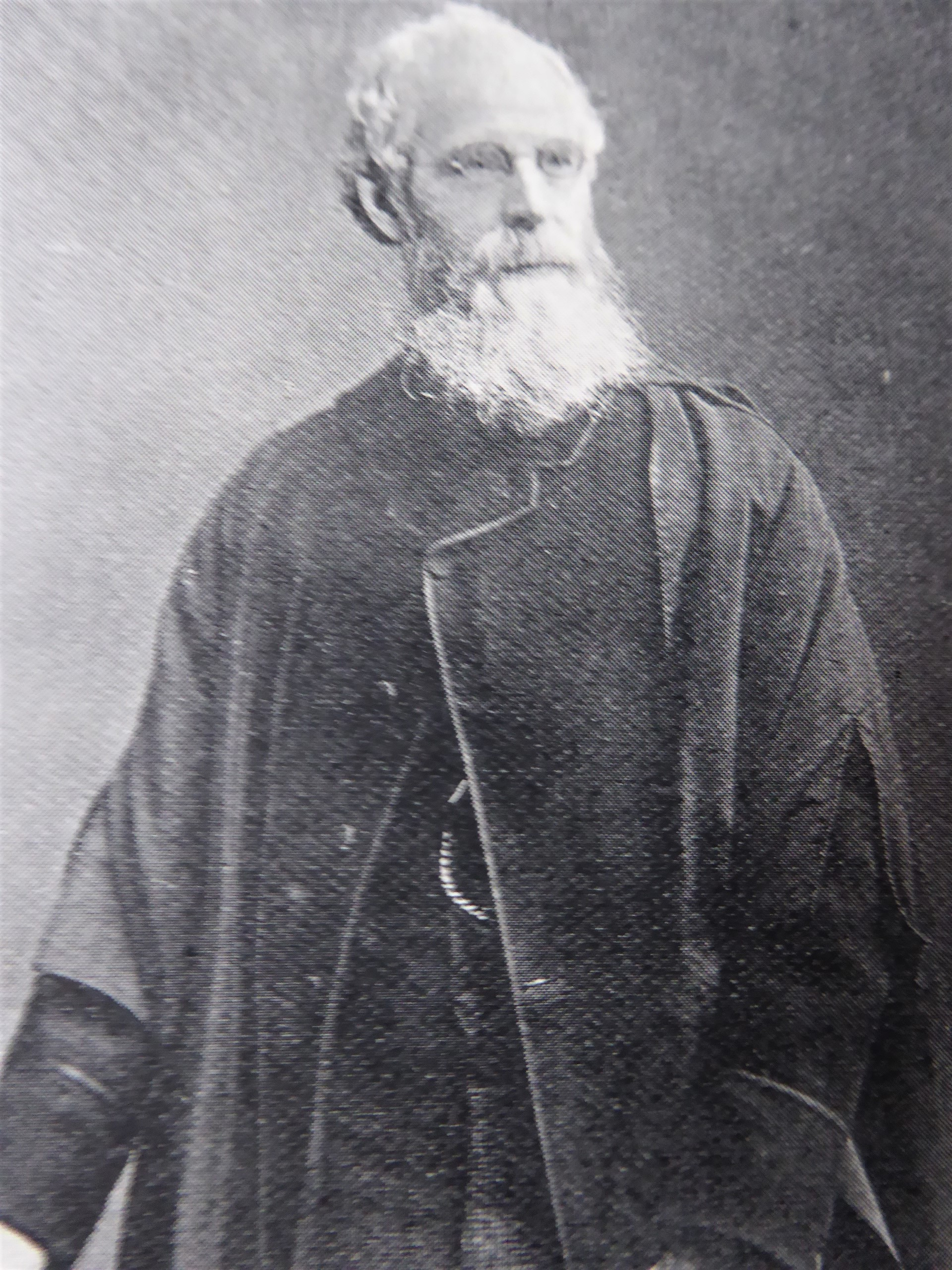
Joseph Gouge Greenwood

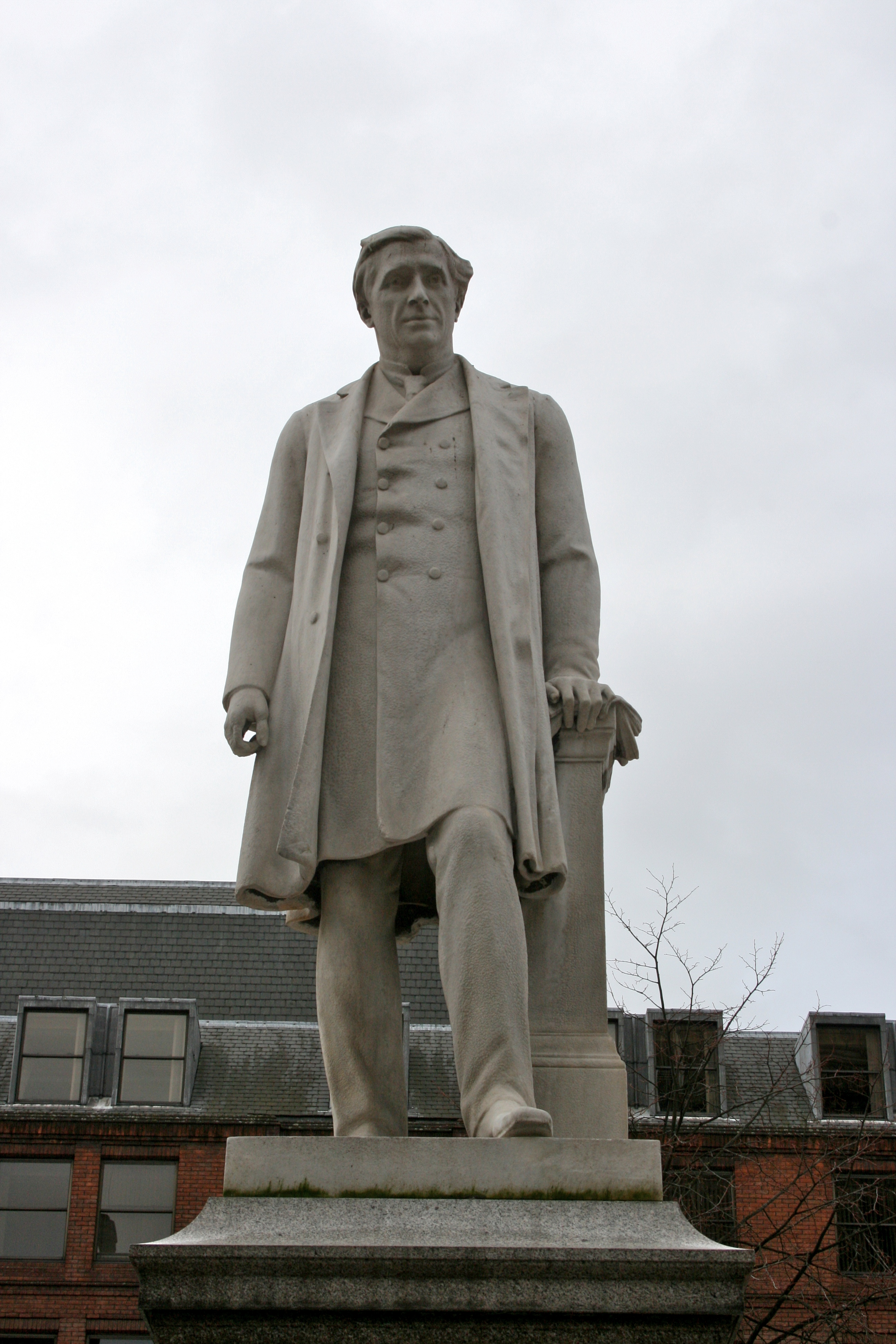
Oliver Heywood

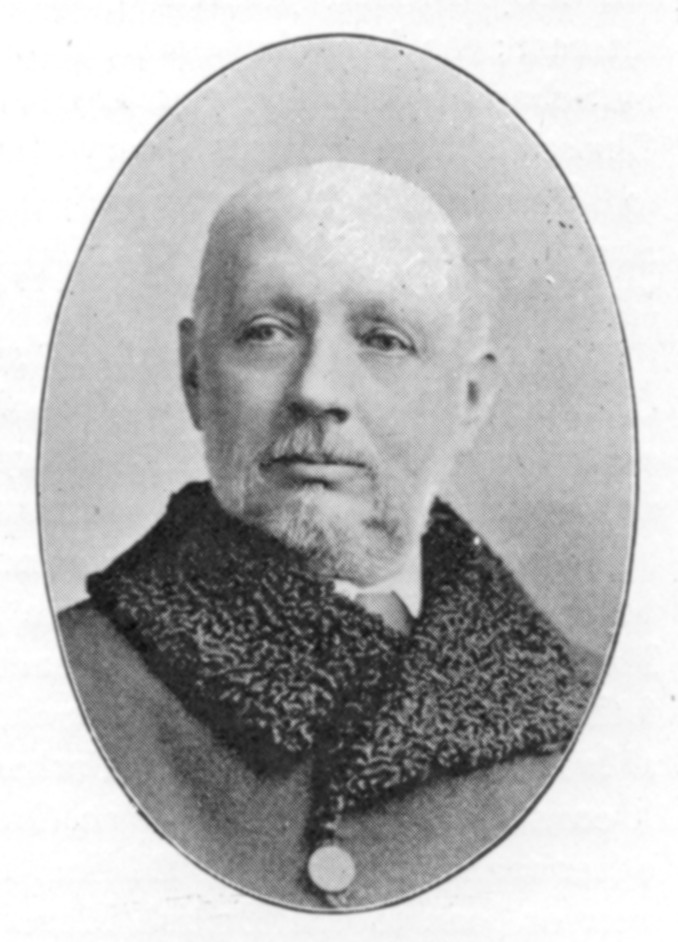
Richard Copley Christie

=== Principals ===
- Rev. Evelyn Joseph Hone (1870–1874)
- Rev. Charles Bernard Drake (1874–1876)

Vacant (1876–1886)

=== Wardens ===
- Rev. Edward Lee Hicks (1886–1892)
- Rev. Edwin Bourdieu England (1892–1903)
- Rev. John Henry Hopkinson (1903–1914)
- Rev. Thomas Nicklin (1914–1937)
- Rev. Arthur Henry White (1937–1950)
- Rev. John Flitcroft (1950–1964)
- Dr. John Norman Hartshorne (1964–1983)
- Dr. Graham Peter Rabey (1983–1985)
- Dr. W. Thain Flowers (1985–1997)
- Dr. Jackie Wilson (1997–2011)
- Michael Mercer (2011–2017)

=== ResLife Officers/Coordinators ===
- Katie Urnevitch (2017–2019)
- Nicola Runciman (2019–2020)
- Thomas Goodison (2020–)

=== Notable alumni ===
- Arthur Aspinall (1901–1972), historian
- Liv Boeree (b. 1984), science communicator, television presenter and former professional poker player
- Niels Bohr (1885–1962), Danish physicist who received the Nobel Prize in Physics in 1922. Stayed at Hulme Hall during his time at the University of Manchester in 1912
- George Norman Burkhardt (1900–1991), Dean of Science at the Victoria University of Manchester
- W. Edward Chadwick, delivered the 1909 Hulsean Lecture on the topic Social Relationships in the Light of Christianity
- Clare Connor (b. 1976), England cricket captain, first female president of Marylebone Cricket Club
- Ashley Dukes (1885–1959), playwright, dramatist, theatre critic, and theatre manager. Founded the Mercury Theatre
- Michael Napier CBE KC, former president of the Law Society and was the attorney-general's pro bono envoy between 2001 and 2015. Senior Man of Hulme Hall, 1966–67
- Freya North (b. 1967), author, one of the precursors of chick lit
- Maurice Oldfield (1915–1981), served as the seventh director of the Secret Intelligence Service (MI6), from 1973 to 1978
- Eric Partridge (1894–1979), a New Zealand–British lexicographer of the English language, particularly of its slang
- H. Ellis Tomlinson (1916–1997), educationist and heraldist
- Benjamin Wallfisch (b. 1979), composer of film scores, including Blade Runner 2049, Shazam!, and It
- Robin Waterfield (b. 1952), classical scholar, translator, editor, and writer of children's fiction

== Colours and arms ==
The hall has used the arms of its chief benefactor William Hulme since the 1880s. The arms as used by the hall are varied slightly, inverting the colours of the canton and chaplet. It is not known how this inversion came about, or whether it was a deliberate difference. These arms have long been the basis of the hall colours, which are defined by a 1924 amendment to the original hall constitution (of 1917) as being navy, gold, and red.

Hall colours were initially a blue blazer with 1/4 inch white piping and the hall arms embroidered on the pocket. These blazers saw a decline over the next few decades and in the 1980s new sporting colours were designed. These took the form of different ties, complementing the existing striped and crested hall tie:

- Navy with the Hulme arms – the hall tie
- Navy with the Hulme arms within a laurel wreath – half colours
- Burgundy with the Hulme arms within a laurel wreath – full colours
- Burgundy with the Hulme arms – the Senior Student's Award

Coat of arms of Hulme Hall
Adopted c.1890s Crest A lion's head coupled Gules on a cap of maintenance (Gules turned up Ermine) upon the helmet of a gentleman. Escutcheon Barry of eight, Or and Azure, on a canton Argent, a chaplet Gules proper. Motto Fide Sed Cui Vide (Trust, but Mind Whom)

== See also ==
- Listed buildings in Manchester-M14
- William Hulme
- Hulme Trust

== Sources ==
- Hartwell, Clare; Hyde, Matthew; Pevsner, Nikolaus (2004), Lancashire: Manchester and the South-East, The Buildings of England, New Haven and London: Yale University Press, ISBN 0-300-10583-5
- Historic England, "Hulme Hall, Hall of Residence, University of Manchester (original portion), Manchester (1246448)", National Heritage List for England
