= Woolton Hall, Manchester =

Hall of residence of the University of Manchester

Coordinates: 53°26′35.8″N 02°12′55.5″W

Woolton Hall
- University of Manchester
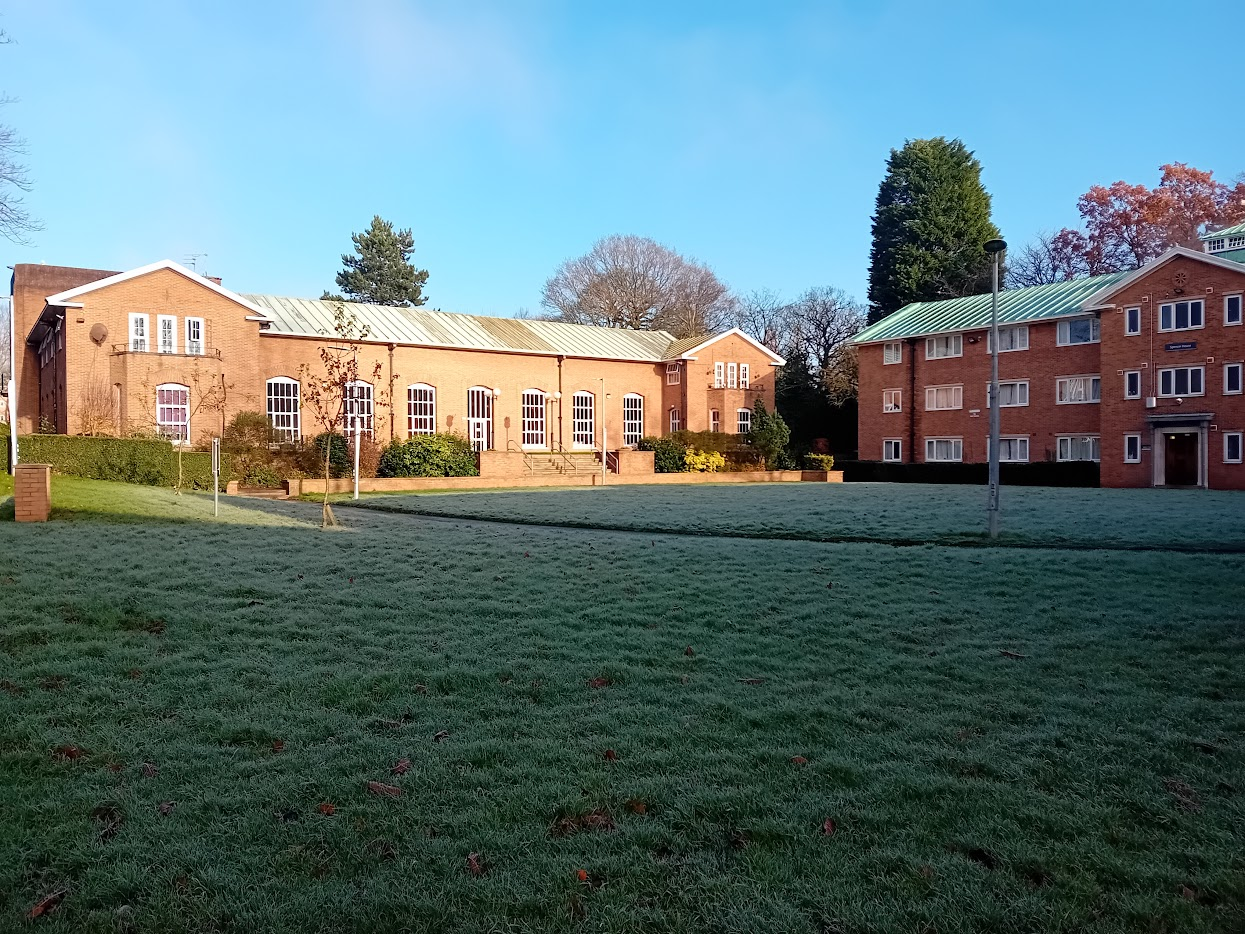
- The Main Building

- The Arms of Lord Woolton; Arms: Sable on a Bend engrailed between two Garbs Or a Rose Gules barbed and seeded proper between two Lions rampant of the field.
- Location: Fallowfield Campus, Manchester, England
- Established: 1959
- Named for: Frederick Marquis, 1st Earl of Woolton
- Architect: Hubert Worthington

Woolton Hall is a traditional University of Manchester hall of residence situated within the Fallowfield Campus complex. Established in 1959 as a male-only hall (and remaining a men's hall until 1990) it was the last traditional catered hall of residence founded as part of the University of Manchester, during a period of ambitious residential expansion for the university. Along with Hulme Hall, Dalton-Ellis Hall, Ashburne Hall, and St. Anselm Hall, Woolton is one of the five remaining traditional collegiate halls of residence at the University of Manchester. The hall is catered and contains a Junior Common Room.

The hall is catered with two meals served a day, and made up of five residential blocks: Spencer, Lindsay, Morley, Cavendish and Ashley. Ashley is for postgraduates only. They are situated around two quadrangles along with the main building, which contains the dining hall, kitchens, and common areas.

== History ==
Woolton Hall was built as part of an expansion in the provision of residence during the 1950s at the Victoria University of Manchester, when the then Vice-Chancellor declared that it was the aim of the university to: 'become ultimately, and as quickly as possible, a residential university'. Woolton's architect was Hubert Worthington, who also designed the university Dental School, and whose brother Percy Worthington had designed the main library and two other halls of residence at Manchester - Hulme and Ashburne. As with other buildings of Worthington's, there are architectural puns on the name 'Woolton': the weathervanes feature sheep and lambs. It was named after Lord Woolton, then Chancellor of the university, whose arms and coronet appear in architectural details around the hall, and opened by the Duke of Edinburgh in November 1959. From 1959 to 1990 the hall was all male, and by the 1980s was considered ‘welcoming, enchanting and gregarious’, in an era when other men's halls (such as Hulme and Dalton) were either mixing or merging with women's halls. The Woolton JCR continued to put on the well known JCR discos. In 1990 the hall became a mixed residence. Its exuberant nature has remained to some extent, later described by the Tab in 2015 as "a place reliant on fun and frolics," though a 2022 review of halls from the Mancunion only mentioned that it was quieter than other Fallowfield halls, and had "a nice old-school vibe." Plans to redevelop the Fallowfield Campus revealed by the university in 2023 likely propose the demolition of Woolton Hall.

== Gallery ==
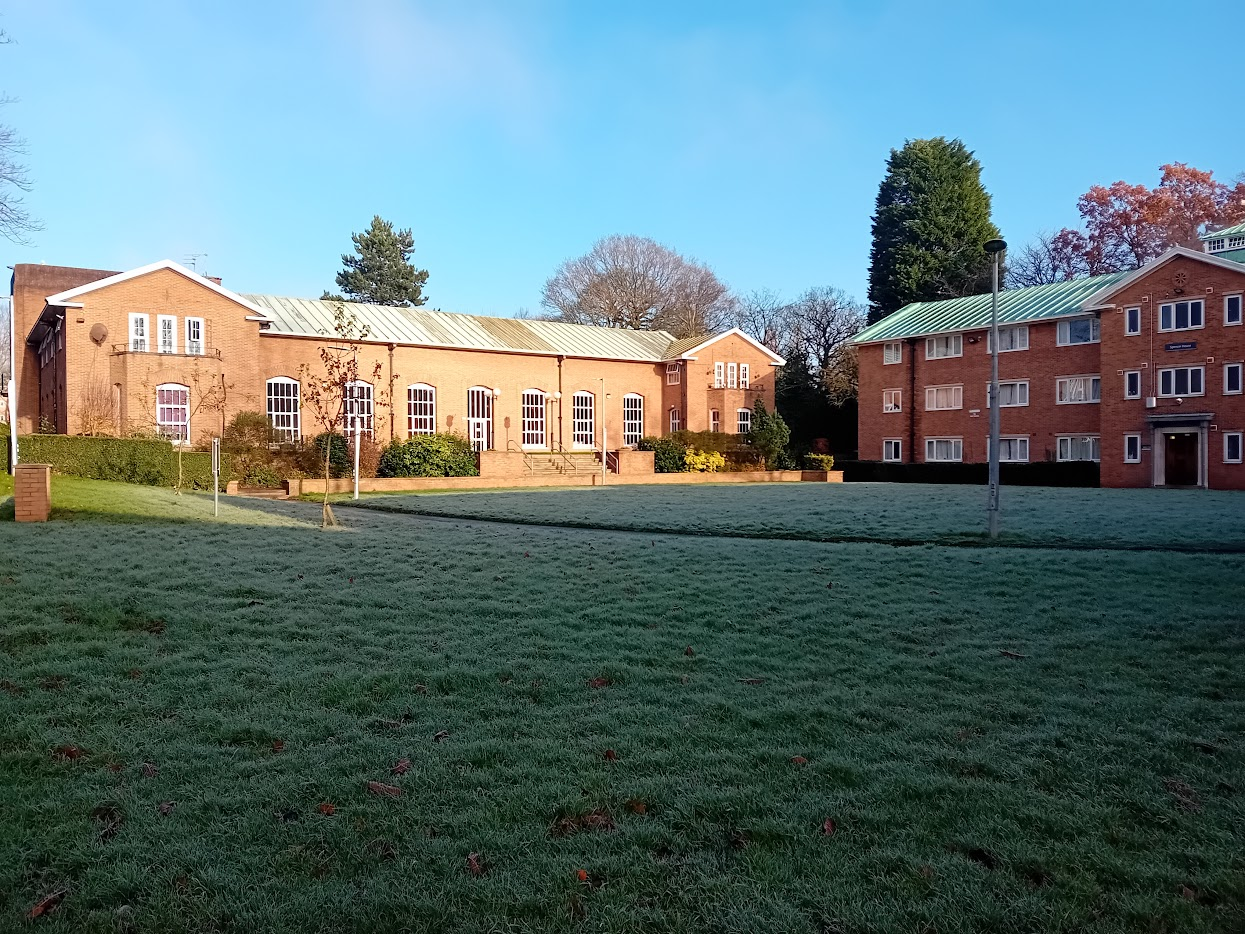
The Main Building

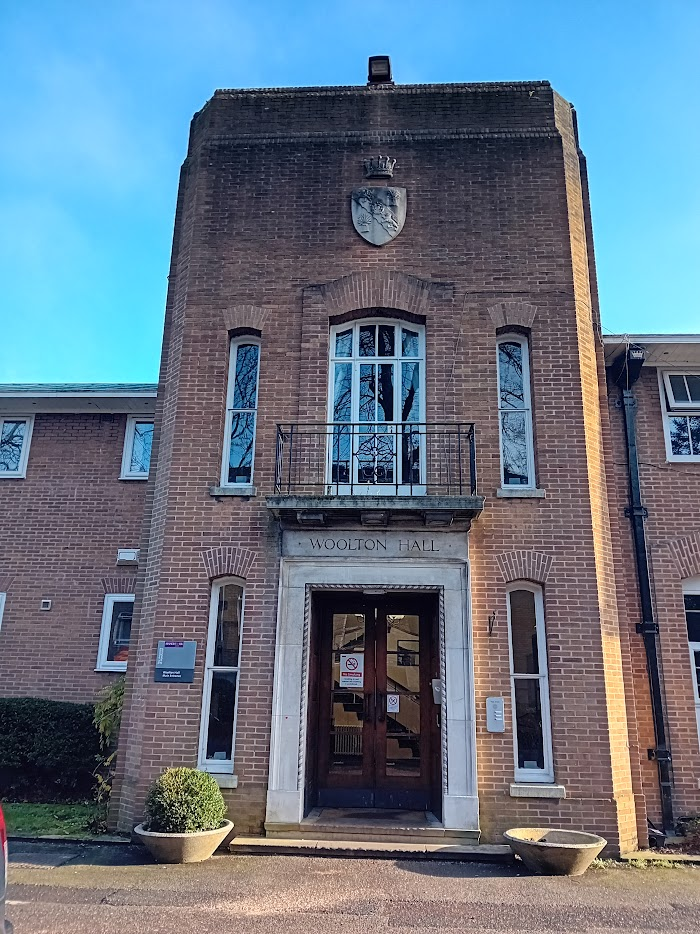
The main entrance

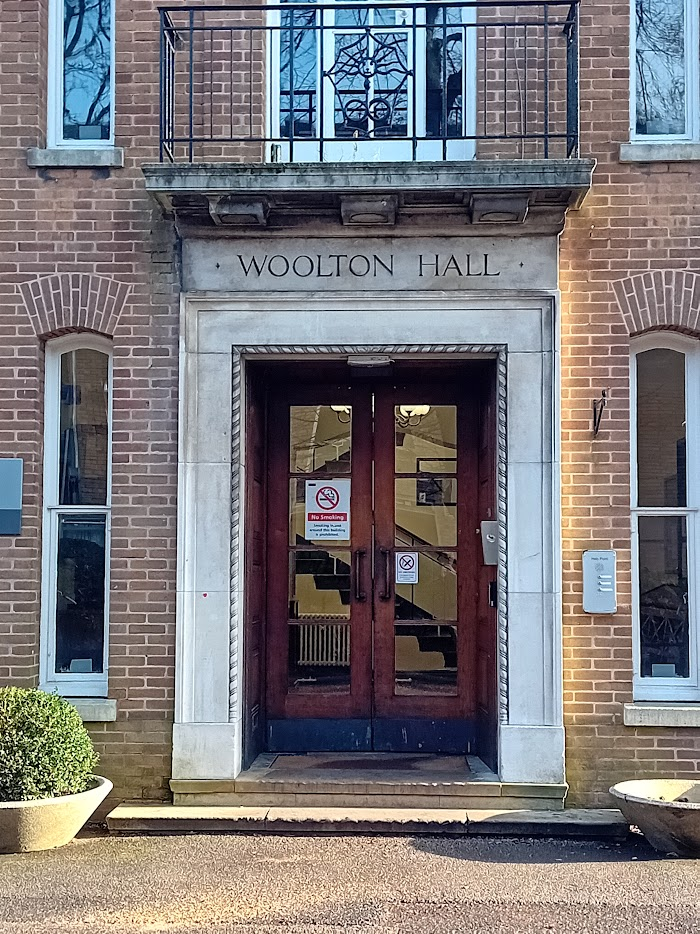
The main door
