= H. Ellis Tomlinson =

English schoolteacher and heraldist

Harold Ellis Tomlinson
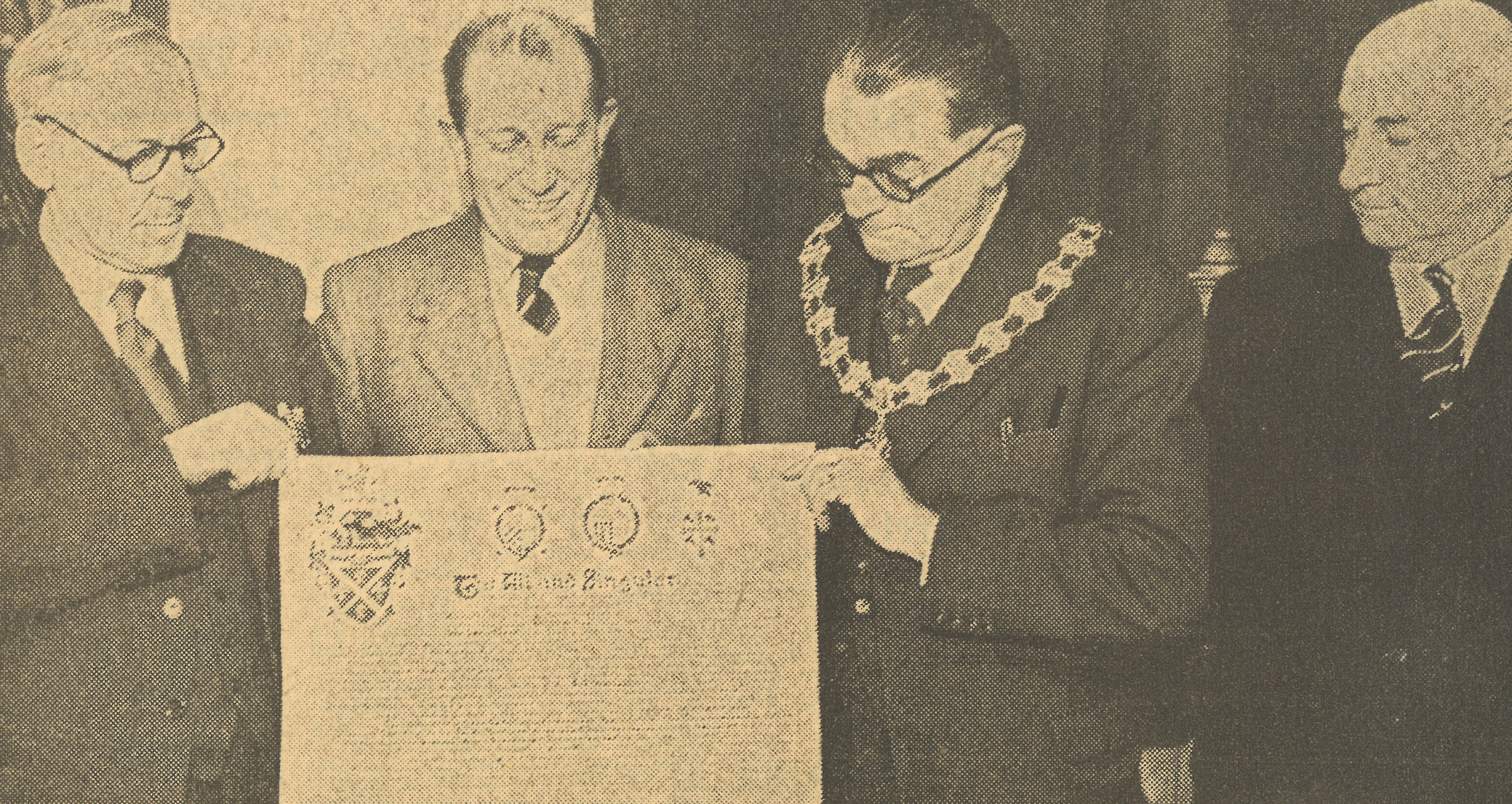
- Tomlinson (left) presents the coat of arms to Knutsford Urban District Council, 1955
- Born: 1916; Cheshire
- Died: 1997 (aged 80–81)
- Occupations: Teacher, heraldist

Harold Ellis Tomlinson PhD (1916–1997) was an English schoolteacher and heraldist. He designed many civic and corporate coats of arms, served as heraldic advisor to local government associations, and published monographs on the subject.

== Early life and education ==
Tomlinson was born in Cheshire, and moved to The Fylde in 1928. He attended Baines’ Grammar School as a boy, became Senior Prefect in 1933. He attended the University of Manchester where he graduated with a degree in French in 1937 and then a teaching certificate in 1938. Whilst at university he lived at Hulme Hall.

== Baines School ==
Tomlinson returned to Baines School as a master in 1940. He taught at the school until retirement in 1974, becoming a legend in his own lifetime affectionately known to generations of boys as 'Toss'. He taught a number of subjects and was heavily involved in the school's sporting and extracurricular activities. His favourite football coaching phrase was "'av a dabble".

== Heraldic Career ==
Tomlinson was heraldic advisor to the Rural District Councils Association from 1954 to 1974, and to the Association of District Councils. He designed arms for many local authorities and corporate bodies in England, Australia and South Africa.

His heraldic publications were The Heraldry of Manchester (1944), The Heraldry of Cheshire (1946), The Armorial Bearings of the Caernarvonshire County Council (1950) and Heraldry in Insurance (1950). He provided the illustrations for Sir George Wollaston's Heraldry (1960) and C.J. Smith's The Civic Heraldry of Warwickshire (1974). His doctoral dissertation was on French Historical Elements in the Civic Heraldry of the United Kingdom (1985).

=== Arms Designed ===
United Kingdom

- Calderdale
- Knutsford Urban District Council
- Pocklington,
- City of Salford,
- Teignbridge,
- Gemmological Association of Great Britain
- Football Association of Wales

South Africa

- George, Western Cape
- Wellington, Western Cape
- Worcester, Western Cape
- South African Institute of Electrical Engineers

Australia

- City of Canterbury (New South Wales)
- Wellington, Western Cape
- Hurstville City Council
- City of Rockdale
- City of Wagga Wagga

Other

- University of the West Indies

== Personal life ==
Tomlinson loved his football and was a great fan of Blackpool FC He wrote a history of Blackpool FC, Seasiders - The First 100 years 1887-1987, published by Blackpool FC.
