= Alice Greenwood =

19th/20th-century British historian, teacher, and writer

- Born: 18 November 1862; Lancashire, England
- Died: 27 April 1935 (aged 72); Williton, England
- Education: Cheltenham Ladies' College
- Occupation: Historian

Alice Drayton Greenwood (18 November 1862 – 27 April 1935) was a British historian, teacher and writer.

== Early life ==
Greenwood was born in Chorlton in Lancashire. Her father was Joseph Gouge Greenwood and her mother was Elizabeth (Eliza) Taylor. Her maternal grandfather was Unitarian minister John Taylor. Alice had a younger sister and her mother died in 1871. The sisters were brought up in Fallowfield after her father remarried. Her father's career in teaching went well and he rose to be a Professor of History and Classics. In 1857 he was made principal of Owen's College. In 1880 he became the vice-chancellor of Victoria University of Manchester whilst Alice was at Cheltenham Ladies' College. In 1882 she left the college and she was able to side step the discrimination to women at Victoria University. Her father was generally supportive of her education and she was able to avoid the rule that prevented women from entering the university by attending lectures held by the university in Brunswick Street. She was mentored by the Latin professor Augustus Samuel Wilkins and by Herman Hager who taught German literature, but importantly, she was spotted by Adolphus William Ward who was professor of English language and history.

After two years at Somerville Hall Greenwood and Gertrude Bell won the only first class honours degrees awarded to women that year. Of the 11 candidates, Oxford University only recorded nine men at the time and ignored the two women. Some sources say that Bell was the only and first woman that year.

== Career ==
In 1888 Greenwood started teaching at Clifton High School for Girls where she found that she liked teaching but did not want to become an administrator. She moved on to North Manchester High School for Girls four years later. In 1892 she completed her first book Europe and Papacy in the Middle Ages.

Greenwood was in contact with her former mentor, Adolphus Ward, who succeeded her father at Owen's College. He was starting a school for girls in Manchester and in 1896 she became the second headteacher of Withington Girls' School.

She decided, in 1900, to devote her time to writing and she resigned her headship of Withington Girls School. She continued to work with Adolphus Ward, as he was the editor of The Cambridge Modern History, from 1901 and he was the co-editor of the Cambridge History of English Literature from 1907. Greenwood completed numerous tasks for both of these works and was credited with chapters in the Cambridge History of English Literature. In 1907 and 1911 she published two volumes of the Lives of the Hanoverian Queens of England. Her thorough research was noted for its lack of speculation; she stated the known facts about the women and did not pad out the work with facts about Hanoverian men. She did, however, take a subjective view of history from her Queens' point of view.

The second volume of Lives of the Hanoverian Queens of England was published while she was at Oxford as she moved to St Hugh's College in 1910 where she became involved in the running of the college.

Greenwood continued to write and in 1921 she published History of the People of England - Vol. I - 55 B.C. to A.D. 1485.

== Retirement and death ==
She and a teaching friend named Helen Turing retired together to London and then on to Somerset where Greenwood died at Williton.

== Works include ==
- Empire and Papacy in the Middle Ages: An Introduction to the Study of Medieval History for Use in Schools (1892)
- Edward II to Richard III (1902); Volume 2 of History in Biography series
- Lives of the Hanoverian Queens of England; Volumes I & II (1909–1911)
- Horace Walpole's World: A Sketch of Whig Society Under George III (1913)
- Select Letters of Horace Walpole (1914)
- Selection from the Paston Letters as Transcribed by Sir John Fenn. (1920) Arr. and Edited by Alice Drayton Greenwood
- History of the English People
  - 55 B.C. to 1485 A.D; Volume 1 (1921)
  - 1485 to 1688; Volume 2 (1923)
  - 1689 to 1834; Volume 3 (1926)
  - A.D. 1834 to 1910, the Victorian Age (1927)
