= Phoebe Sheavyn =

- Born: Phoebe Ann Beale Sheavyn; 16 September 1865; Atherstone, Warwickshire, England
- Died: 7 January 1968 (aged 102); Selly Oak
- Occupations: Literary scholar and feminist

Academic background
- Education: University College Wales, Aberystwth (BA, MA); University of London (DLitt)

Phoebe Ann Beale Sheavyn (16 September 1865 – 7 January 1968) was a British literary scholar and feminist. She was a professor at Victoria University of Manchester. She was a founding member of the British Federation of University Women.

== Life ==
Sheavyn was born in 1865 in Atherstone. She was the fifth child of eight siblings, daughter of Jane Elizabeth Sheavyn, (born Farmer) and William Sale Sheavyn. The family lived above their draper's store in Atherstone. She began her career as a teacher before she became a governess to an architect's family.

Her employer tutored her and encouraged her to take university entrance exams and she obtained a scholarship from the College of Aberystwyth in Wales. She graduated at age 24, and taught English from 1889 to 1892 at the Haberdashers' School for Girls in the London Borough of Lewisham.

She resumed her studies in Aberystwyth and obtained a master's degree in English and French in 1894. She was recruited by Bryn Mawr College in Pennsylvania as a fellow and lecturer in 1894. She returned in England in 1896, worked for a year with the philologist Joseph Wright on the English Dialect Dictionary. In 1897 she was appointed by Agnes Catherine Maitland as a Resident Tutor at Somerville College, Oxford. She was the first person appointed to this position who was not from Oxford or Cambridge.

Sheavyn discovers the discrimination given to female teachers at Oxford or Cambridge, which she had not experienced at Aberystwyth or Bryn Mawr. She took a sabbatical year in 1905–1906 to finish her doctoral thesis which she defended at the University of London in 1906, and which formed the basis of her work The Literary Profession in the Elizabethan Age, published in 1909 at Manchester University. In the work she argues that the work of Elizabethan poets is distorted by the need to gather a patron and this results in eulogy and flattery.

Sheavyn is one of the pioneers of the British Federation of University Women, along with the founder biochemist Ida Smedley Maclean and physiologist Winifred Cullis. The three of them are creditted with being the federation's de facto executive during the first few years.

She left Oxford in 1907, to take up a post as a lecturer at Victoria University, Manchester. She was a student tutor and the third warden at Ashburne Hall, the women's halls of residence founded in 1900. She was said to be a remarkable warden as she supervised the hall's move to Fallowfield and new buildings which were designed by Thomas Worthington and Sons - the first of which was built in 1910.

She was a member of the university senate in 1912. She resigned before 1917 from her duties at Ashburne Hall. She retired in 1925. She moved to Selly Oak, a district of Birmingham, started painting using equipment supplied by her friend Margery Fry. She made landscapes and flowers, and latterly learned Scrabble.

In 1967, the University of Manchester republished her work The Literary Profession in the Elizabethan Age. Aspects of this work are subject to criticism, particularly in relation to the exclusion of certain Elizabethan authors, but his book, when first published in 1909, is regarded as one of the first studies in English literary criticism 1.

She died at her home in Selly Oak aged 102 on 7 January 1968. An extension to Ashburne Hall was named after Sheavyn. Sheavyn House is detached, self-catering and en-suite and it was opened in 1994.
