= Thomas Erskine (theologian) =

Scottish advocate and lay theologian

Thomas Erskine of Linlathen (13 October 1788 – 20 March 1870) was a Scottish advocate and lay theologian in the early part of the 19th century. With his friend the Reverend John McLeod Campbell he attempted a revision of Calvinism.

== Life ==
Erskine was the youngest son of David and Ann Erskine. His great-grandfather was Colonel John Erskine of Carnock, near Dunfermline. The colonel's son was John Erskine of Carnock whose second son, David, was a writer to the signet, and purchased the estate of Linlathen, near Dundee; by the death without surviving issue of his elder brothers, it came into the possession of Thomas Erskine in 1816.

After his father's death when he was very young, Erskine was left largely to the care of his maternal grandmother, Mrs. Graham of Airth Castle, a Stirling of Ardoch, Episcopalian and a strong Jacobite. Erskine was educated at the Edinburgh High School, a school in Durham, and the University of Edinburgh, and was admitted a member of the Faculty of Advocates in 1810. He took a place in the literary society of Edinburgh.

Inheriting by the death of his brother James the estate of Linlathen, Erskine retired from the bar, and gave himself up to the study of questions of theology. He travelled and made friends including Thomas Carlyle, Arthur Penrhyn Stanley, Alexander Ewing, F. D. Maurice, Lucien-Anatole Prévost-Paradol, Alexandre Vinet, Adolphe Monod, and Madame de Broglie. He initially wrote extensively on contemporary religious controversies.

In 1831 the General Assembly of the Church of Scotland deposed John McLeod Campbell, minister of Rhu, for preaching the doctrine of universal atonement. Erskine strongly supported Campbell, and went further in doctrine, espousing universal reconciliation.

When Erskine died at home in 1870, his last words were: "Lord Jesus!"

== Works ==
Erskine was known as the author of:

- Remarks on the Internal Evidence for the Truth of Revealed Religion (1820);
- an Essay on Faith (1822); and
- Unconditional Freeness of the Gospel (1828).

These books all passed through several editions. Erskine also authored The Brazen Serpent (1831), and then wrote The Doctrine of Election, a lengthy treatise on the theological doctrine of predestination and interaction with Paul's Letter to the Romans, which appeared in 1837. This was the final work during his lifetime.

A posthumously published work was The Spiritual Order and Other Papers (1871). Two volumes of his letters, edited by William Hanna, appeared in 1877.

== Views ==
Erskine was an Episcopalian, self-taught in theology. He emphasized the loving side of God's nature, supported the universal atonement of Christ, and was critical of the typical federal theology of the Scottish Calvinism of his time.

The work The Doctrine of Election has a purpose and theme that may be summed up as follows:

The current form of Calvinistic doctrine goes against human experience and the real message of Scripture. The powers of good and evil, of God and the self, strive within every person's soul. A person's 'elective will' in one's own personality determines with which of the other two wills one chooses to side. This last will only chooses which of the two shall be dominant. Thus, God inwardly encourages us to choose the good, the true and the beautiful—we are not agents of our own good decision making, but rather we choose that which God has already chosen for us.

As Erskine studied the Bible text he became convinced that it "presented a history of wondrous love in order to excite gratitude, of a high and holy worth, to attract veneration and esteem. It presented a view of danger, to produce alarm; of refuge to confer peace and joy; and of eternal glory, to animate hope." A quote shows some of his thinking:

Christ, the gift of God's present forgiving love to every man and woman, is the door through which alone we can enter into our provision of hope. Until we know the love of our Father's heart to us, as manifested in Christ, the future must always be to us at best a dark and doubtful wilderness. But when we know that all that we have conceived of our Father's love, is as nothing to the reality—that he is indeed love itself—a love passing knowledge—a shoreless, boundless, bottomless ocean-fountain of love, of holy, sin-hating, sin-destroying love, which longs over us that we should be filled with itself—and be by it delivered from the power of evil—then, indeed, we are saved by hope, for we know that love must triumph and fulfill all its counsel.

== Reputation ==
In his day and time Erskine was influential on theologically forward-thinking pastors and theologians. The German church historian Otto Pfleiderer "regard[ed] [Erskine's] ideas as the best contribution to dogmatics which British theology has produced in the present century." He influenced especially Frederick Denison Maurice, Alexander John Scott and George MacDonald.
