= Alexander John Scott (principal) =

Alexander John Scott (1805–1866) was a Scottish dissident theologian, who became the first principal of Owens College in Manchester.

== Early life ==
The son of Rev Dr John Scott DD (died 1836), minister of the Middle Parish, Greenock, by his wife Susanna Fisher, daughter of Alexander Fisher of Dychmount, he was born on 26 March 1805. He was educated at the local grammar school and at the University of Glasgow, which he entered at the age of fourteen, remaining there until he was twenty-one. Having graduated M.A. in 1824, then studying Medicine for three years at Edinburgh University, tutoring in Edinburgh during the same period.

In 1827 he was licensed by the presbytery of Paisley to preach as a minister of the Church of Scotland.

== Minister ==
His first sermon after he was licensed was preached in the Row Church for the Rev. John McLeod Campbell, who heard him 'with very peculiar delight.' In the following year (1828) he made the acquaintance of Thomas Erskine of Linlathen, afterwards one of his closest friends, and of Edward Irving, who invited him to be his assistant in London. He accepted the invitation, without committing himself to Irving's doctrinal views. He spent the winter months in preaching and teaching among the poor of Westminster. Towards the close of 1829 he went to preach for McLeod Campbell at Row, and also at Port Glasgow, where his sermons on the Charismata or 'spiritual gifts' of 1 Corinthians xii. led to an exhibition of speaking with tongues and prophesying in the church. The movement and the manifestations accompanying it had great influence on Irving, more than on Scott himself, who never felt the utterances to be proofs of any inspiration. The connection between the two preachers was soon afterwards severed, though their friendship continued.

In the summer of 1830 Scott received an invitation to the pastorate of the Scottish church at Woolwich, but the necessary ordination involved subscription to the Westminster Confession of Faith. This he could not give, and he put his objections in a letter to the moderator of the London presbytery, in which he stated his inability to assent to the doctrine that 'none are redeemed by Christ but the elect only,’ as well as his conviction that the 'Sabbath and the Lord's day were not, as stated in the catechism, one ordinance, but two, perfectly distinct, the one Jewish and the other Christian.' He also mentioned doubts as to the validity of the presbytery's powers in ordination. On 27 May 1831 he was charged with heresy before the presbytery of Paisley, and deprived of his licence to preach, a sentence which was confirmed by the General Assembly of the Church of Scotland. Scott then remained at Woolwich until 1846, as minister of a small congregation.

== Academic ==
In November 1848 he obtained the chair of English language and literature in University College London, and in 1851 was appointed principal of Owens College, Manchester, then recently established. With this post he held the professorship of logic and mental philosophy, of comparative grammar, and of English language and literature. Soon after his appointment he took part with the Rev. William Gaskell and others in starting the Manchester Working Men's College, later merged in the evening classes at Owens College. He resigned the principalship in May 1857, being succeeded by Joseph Gouge Greenwood, but continued to act as professor until his death.

His health, always delicate, grew weaker in his later years. With the hope of gaining strength he went to Switzerland in the autumn of 1865, but died at Veytaux on 12 January 1866, and was buried in the cemetery at Clarens.

== Works ==
His lecture series printed in separate form included:

- 'Lectures Expository and Practical on the Epistle to the Romans,’ 1838.
- 'On the Academical Study of a Vernacular Language,’ 1848.
- 'Suggestions on Female Education,’ 1849.
- 'Notes of Four Lectures on the Literature and Philosophy of the Middle Ages;’ printed for private circulation (by Thomas Erskine of Linlathen), Edinburgh, 1857.
- 'Discourses,’ 1866; this posthumous volume contains early addresses on 'Social Systems of the Present Day compared with Christianity,’ 'Schism,’ and 'The First Principle of Church Government.'

F. D. Maurice dedicated his 'Mediæval Philosophy' to him; James Baldwin Brown dedicated to him his 'Divine Life in Man,’ 1860; and George MacDonald, besides inscribing his novel of 'Robert Falconer' to him, wrote two poems 'to A. J. Scott,’ which are included in his 'Poetical Works' (1893, i. 271, 280).

== Family ==
He married Ann Ker at Greenock in December 1830, and had an only son, John Alexander Scott, B.A., barrister-at-law, who died on 9 January 1894, aged 48; and a daughter. Mrs. Scott died in December 1888.
