= John McLeod Campbell =

Scottish minister and Reformed theologian

John McLeod Campbell in his later years.

John McLeod Campbell (4 May 1800 – 27 February 1872) was a Scottish minister and Reformed theologian. In the opinion of one German church historian, contemporaneous with Campbell, his theology was a highpoint of British theology during the nineteenth century. James B. Torrance ranked him highly on the doctrine of the atonement, placing Campbell alongside Athanasius of Alexandria and Anselm of Canterbury. Campbell took his cue from his close reading of the early Church Fathers, the historic Reformed confessions and catechisms, John Calvin, Martin Luther's commentary on Galatians, and Jonathan Edwards' works.

== Early life ==
Campbell was born on 4 May 1800 in Argyllshire, Scotland, the oldest child of the Rev. Donald Campbell. His mother died when Campbell was only 6, in 1806. Educated chiefly at home by his father, Campbell was already a good Latin scholar when he went to the University of Glasgow in 1811. Finishing his course in 1817, he became a student at the Divinity Hall, where he gained some reputation as a Hebraist.

After further training at the University of Edinburgh Campbell was licensed as a preacher by the presbytery of Lorne in 1821. In 1825 he was appointed to the parish of Row (now Rhu) on the Gareloch and the Clyde coast. There drunkenness was frequent, fights common, and smuggling ordinary; religion was conceived only as offering safety from the anger of God and so prayers and worship rang hollow and were often hypocritical. There was little joy in their Christianity.

Campbell preached universal atonement; and the presbytery in 1829 reviewed the orthodoxy of his preaching and teaching. At issue was the theology of Campbell in his sermons and its relationship and uniformity with the Westminster Standards which all Scottish ministers agreed to preach and teach at their ordination. A first petition was withdrawn; but a subsequent appeal in March 1830 led to a presbyterial visitation, and an accusation of heresy. Campbell clearly disagreed with the Westminster Confession of Faith's view of a limited atonement, and he was removed from the ministry. The General Assembly, by which the charge was ultimately considered, found Campbell guilty of teaching heretical doctrines and deprived him of his living. Several issues came into play, not least that Campbell did not support either of the theological parties in the Assembly, the Moderates or the Evangelicals. Declining an invitation to join Edward Irving in the Catholic Apostolic Church, he worked for two years as an evangelist in the Scottish Highlands.

== In Glasgow ==
Returning to Glasgow in 1833, Campbell was minister for sixteen years in a large chapel specially built for him by close friends. In 1859 his health gave way, and he advised his congregation to join the Barony church, where Norman Macleod was pastor.

== Later years ==
In 1868 he received the degree of D.D. from Glasgow University for his theological work and writing. He and his friends took it to be a reaching out on the part of the Scottish church towards him so long after his deposition from the ministry. It was clear that his book on the atonement was significant and required some response. In 1870 he moved to Rosneath, and there began his Reminiscences and Reflections, an unfinished work published after his death by his son.

Campbell had a close circle of friends, which included Thomas Erskine, Norman McLeod, Alexander Ewing, A.J. Scott, Frederick Maurice and C. J. Vaughan. In 1871 a testimonial, dinner and address were presented to him by representatives of most of the religious bodies in Scotland. He died in early 1872 from prostate cancer. He was buried in Rosneath churchyard.

== Works ==
Jonathan Edward's question regarding the atonement, one of the prompts for Campbell's work, was: "Could God be satisfied by Christ's earnest and honest repentance on behalf of humanity, or was his death necessary for satisfaction, forgiveness, and atonement to occur?" Asked in another way, did Christ have to die to effect atonement, or was there another way for atonement to take place? Campbell also was pastorally sensitive to the attitude of his parishioners in living as Christians. He discovered that their Christianity was essentially joyless and depressing.

Campbell's influence may be seen particularly in the work of Hugh Ross Mackintosh, Donald Baillie, and most notably in Thomas F. Torrance and James B. Torrance. Later Scottish theology affirmed Campbell's influence in its departure from the strict reading of Westminster's Standards. Campbell, through the influence of the Torrance brothers, has begun to be appreciated as a pastoral theologian.

In 1856 Campbell published The Nature of the Atonement, which profoundly influenced Scottish theology. Campbell's theological aim was to view the Atonement in the light of the Incarnation. In the Atonement, one may not separate the birth, person, work, and death of Jesus Christ. As one looks more closely at Christ, one may discover that the divine mind in Christ is the mind of perfect obedient sonship towards God and perfect brotherhood towards men. Jesus Christ in his person fulfills the law to love God wholeheartedly and to love neighbor selflessly. By the light of this divine fact of the Incarnation, Christ's life as atonement, vicariously lived in humanity's place, is seen to develop itself naturally and necessarily as a perfect and complete reconciliation; the penal element in the sufferings of Christ is but one aspect or facet of the atonement.

There is some disagreement among scholars as to whether Campbell is rightly accused of denying the penal substitutionary theory of the atonement with his alternate view. Some would argue that he believed that rather than bearing the sin of humanity, Christ confessed humanity's sin on their behalf. A closer reading of his magnum opus belies this inaccurate view. His vicarious confession is just one part of his mediatorial, vicarious and representative work (as part of his person). Is Christ's death alone sufficient? Or does the nature of the atonement require an additional depth to his death with the addition of his confession of sin on humanity's behalf and his rightful recognition of God's just punishment? McLeod Campbell was clear on Christ's substitutionary death, but developed his theory to add to what he perceived to be a too frequent weakness on the part of previous theories. How participatory does Christ's work have to be in order for it to be effective? His reading of Phineas's zeal in Numbers 25 as making atonement is most instructive in this regard. Some critics have argued that Campbell's position was not self-consistent in the place assigned to the penal and expiatory element in the sufferings of Christ, nor adequate in its recognition of the principle that the obedience of Christ perfectly affirms all righteousness and so satisfies the holiness of God, thus effecting a peace and reconciliation between God and humanity—a true atonement. Others would vociferously disagree. Campbell sought, through his work, to change the dominant paradigm of atonement theory. There are those who suggest he succeeded; while others who argue he did not. He sought, with his atonement theory, to move from a purely legal framework (based as it is in the Latin West) to a filial and familial one (more in keeping with the Orthodox East). This change in language and the concepts behind it is partly to blame for the variety of views regarding whether he ultimately succeeded or failed.

In 1862 Campbell published Thoughts on Revelation and a few years later (1869) he published a revised version of his 1851 book: Christ the Bread of Life.

== Family ==
Campbell married Mary Campbell, daughter of John Campbell of Ardnahua, Kilninver. Their marriage was looked upon unfavorably by his family because of Mary's lower social standing. McLeod Campbell, however, was deeply in love with her and did not let the social inequality stand in the way of their union. As a result, it was years before his family resumed communication and correspondence with him. The union produced four sons, including James Macnabb Campbell, and two daughters; his daughter Jean married William Graham Crum, son of Walter Crum, and was the mother of the Anglican priest and hymnwriter John Macleod Campbell Crum.
