= St Anselm Hall, Manchester =

Hall of residence of the University of Manchester

St Anselm Hall
- University of Manchester
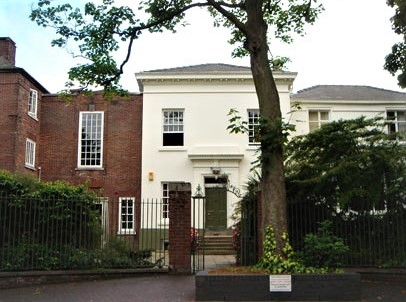
- St Anselm Hall from the Kent Road East Front

- Location: Victoria Park, Manchester, England
- Coordinates: 53.461084°N 2.234177°W
- Motto: Credo ut Intelligam (Latin)
- Motto in English: I believe so that I may understand
- Founder: Rev. Thomas B. Allworthy
- Established: 1907
- Named for: Anselm of Canterbury
- Status: Currently open
- Warden: Abolished
- Residents: 140
- Visitor: Bishop of Manchester
- Website: www.stanselmhall.co.uk

Listed Building – Grade II
- Official name: St Anselm Hall
- Designated: 3 October 1974
- Reference no.: 1197934

St Anselm Hall, known colloquially as Slems, is a traditional hall of residence at the University of Manchester, situated in Victoria Park.

It was founded in 1907 by Rev. Thomas B. Allworthy on behalf of the Church of England for the theological training of male students. The hall was later licensed by the University of Manchester as an official hall of residence in 1954, extending the student capacity from 70 to its current 130.

The hall remained an all-male institution until 2017 when female students were admitted for the first time. Prior to this, it was the last university-owned fraternal hall of residence in the UK. Until 2020, the hall was composed of the Junior Common Room (JCR), made up of undergraduates, and the Senior Common Room, made up of tutors, the warden, and university academics. The last live-in warden left the hall in 2019.

There are currently a number of scholarships attached to the hall. Awarded on an annual basis, these scholarships empower the hall's student leadership and reward exceptional contributions to hall life.

The hall was closed for the academic year 2020–2021, reopening in September 2021.

== History ==
=== Foundation ===
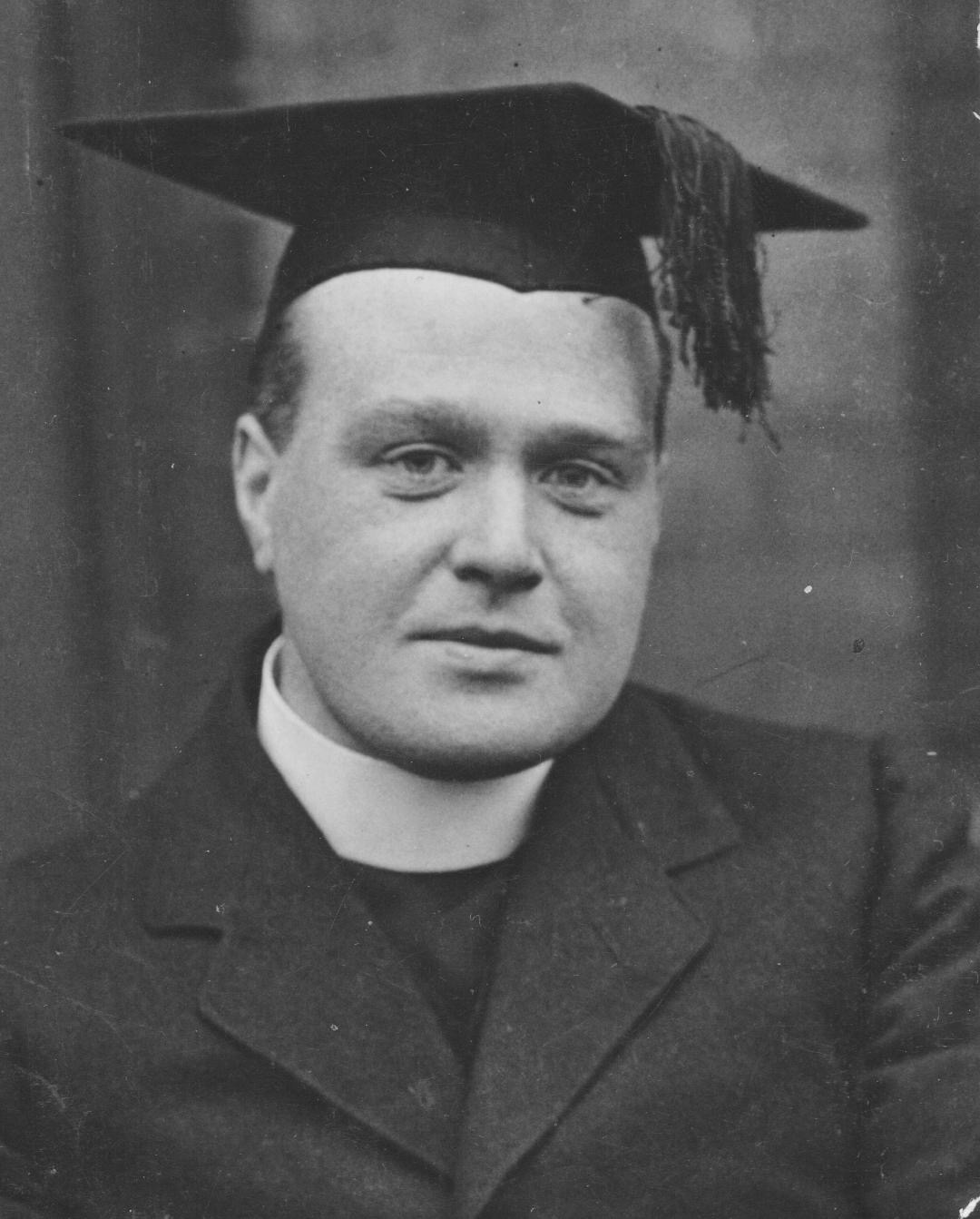
The founder of St Anselm Hall, Rev. Thomas B Allworthy

St Anselm Hall was founded by Rev. Thomas B. Allworthy as Saint Anselm's Hostel in 1907. After the establishment of a theology department at Manchester University in 1903, Allworthy, with the encouragement of Edward Hudson of Rossall School, was prompted to consider founding of a place of residence for working-class men who were studying for holy orders. The idea for the foundation was said to have occurred to Allworthy under a willow tree in Brookdale Park where he had been reading The Life of Saint Anselm with Hudson in the summer of 1907.

An announcement was made in September 1907 of the opening of a hostel "for free training and preparation with maintenance, of candidates for Holy Orders" at 105 Droylsden Road, with places available for eight students. Allworthy served as the first warden and St Anselm's began to function as a place of theological study. As the hostel grew, a new site at Kent House, the former home of physicist Arthur Schuster, was secured for the students and warden to move to in 1914 by Edmund Knox, Bishop of Manchester. This is where St Anselm Hall remains.

After its official re-opening on 14 November 1914, St Anselm's Hostel was renamed St Anselm's Hall (the apostrophe was finally removed in 1933). During the first decade at its new site at Kent House, the hall merged with Gartness Hall, an institution associated with Thomas Brassey, 1st Earl Brassey which also provided accommodation for Anglican ordinands.

=== 20th century–present ===
St Anselm Hall was funded by the Church of England's Central Board of Finance until 1933 when the hall became financially independent. The first half of the 20th century saw growing autonomy in the running of the hall, including the institution in 1922 of a formally-organised JCR committee.

From 1928 to 1933, under the fifth warden, the Revd. Canon Duncan Armytage, later Canon of the Ninth Stall at Windsor Castle, St Anselm Hall underwent a period of development including the establishment of the Senior Common Room made up of university academics, the growth of the library, and the creation of a number of societies and events which still exist today.

The hall remained open during World War II and housed a number of men from the armed forces who were undertaking short training courses at the university. Applications to St Anselm Hall fell immediately after the war, and it was proposed that it should become an Anglican theological college. Instead of this, the decision was taken to transfer ownership to the university on 1 August 1956 under the eighth warden, the Revd. Canon Ronald Preston.

Despite maintaining strong links with the Church of England, this transferral was significant in reshaping the ethos of the hall away from being a solely Anglican institution, since the former statutory appointment of a cleric to the position of warden was repealed. From 1956 onward, wardens have been both theologians and academics in other fields, and the admissions process was broadened to accept residents from all academic disciplines. The still-functioning St Anselm Hall Committee was from this point charged with the running of hall.

A major building project took place in 1961, which saw two new accommodation wings, Manor and Summerfield, built next to Kent House and the 1927 Dewar Wing to form a quad, along with a dining hall and new chapel, all of which are still in use today. This expanded the hall's capacity to around 140 residents.

On 2 October 1974, the hall became a Grade II listed building.

A number of partnerships with nearby halls were formed in the latter half of the 20th century, namely with Ashburne Hall and St. Gabriel's Hall, which were both all-female institutions at the time. In 1992 a new self-catering hall, Canterbury Court, opened opposite St Anselm Hall, and the two halls have since maintained a close partnership.

In 2016 the decision was made to accept female students; by this point St Anselm Hall was the last remaining all-male university-owned hall of residence in the United Kingdom. The hall has been mixed since September 2017, and almost half of the hall's residents are now female.

== Hall grounds ==
St Anselm Hall is situated on Kent Road East, and occupies the southern side of the road entirely with its buildings. These are the main building, the chapel, an onsite gym, and the warden's lodge.

The main building consists of the dining hall, the on-site bar and the residential wings, each with individual names. Schuster (formerly known as Kent Hall) forms the main part of the hall, and was formerly home to the mathematical physicist Arthur Schuster. As well as housing some students, it also contains the hall's library and the Junior and Senior Common Rooms. The first extension to take place was the Dewar wing, named after the fourth warden of the hall, Revd. Canon Lindsay Dewar (1922–1927), and was constructed in 1927. Manor and Summerfield are the two newest residential wings, built by the university in the 1960s. They were constructed to replace two older houses (also called Manor and Summerfield) which had been used as student accommodation during the inter-war period.

The chapel, designed by Harry Fairhurst, lies behind the main building. It remains an active place of Anglican worship, with regular services of Evensong and Compline during weeks in term time. Every year, a student is elected as a sacristan to assist the hall chaplain in his work.

The warden's lodge is a detached house in the hall grounds. Built for the eighth warden, Revd. Canon Prof. Preston (1948–1963), it now houses postgraduate students.

== Communal dinner (Formal Hall) ==
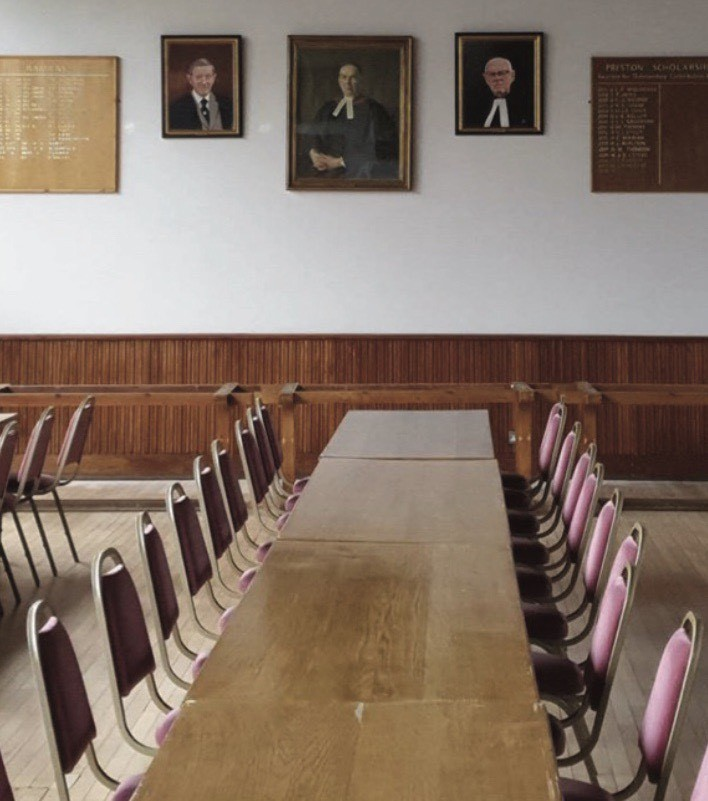
The Dining Hall

St Anselm Hall is one of the last remaining halls to partake in a communal (formal) dinner, otherwise known as Formal Hall, an event which takes place every weekday evening during term time. Communal dinner, presided over by the warden or a tutor, is central to life at St Anselm, as it provides a space where the hall can come together and build a close-knit community.

St Anselm dining hall contains three "relaxed" tables where casual attire can be worn and, at the end of the room, the "top table", where formal dress is required. The top table is where the warden, the JCR committee and the tutors sit, although any students are welcome to join them if they wish. All those attending dinner (both staff and students) wear academic gowns, which are available to purchase from the JCR.

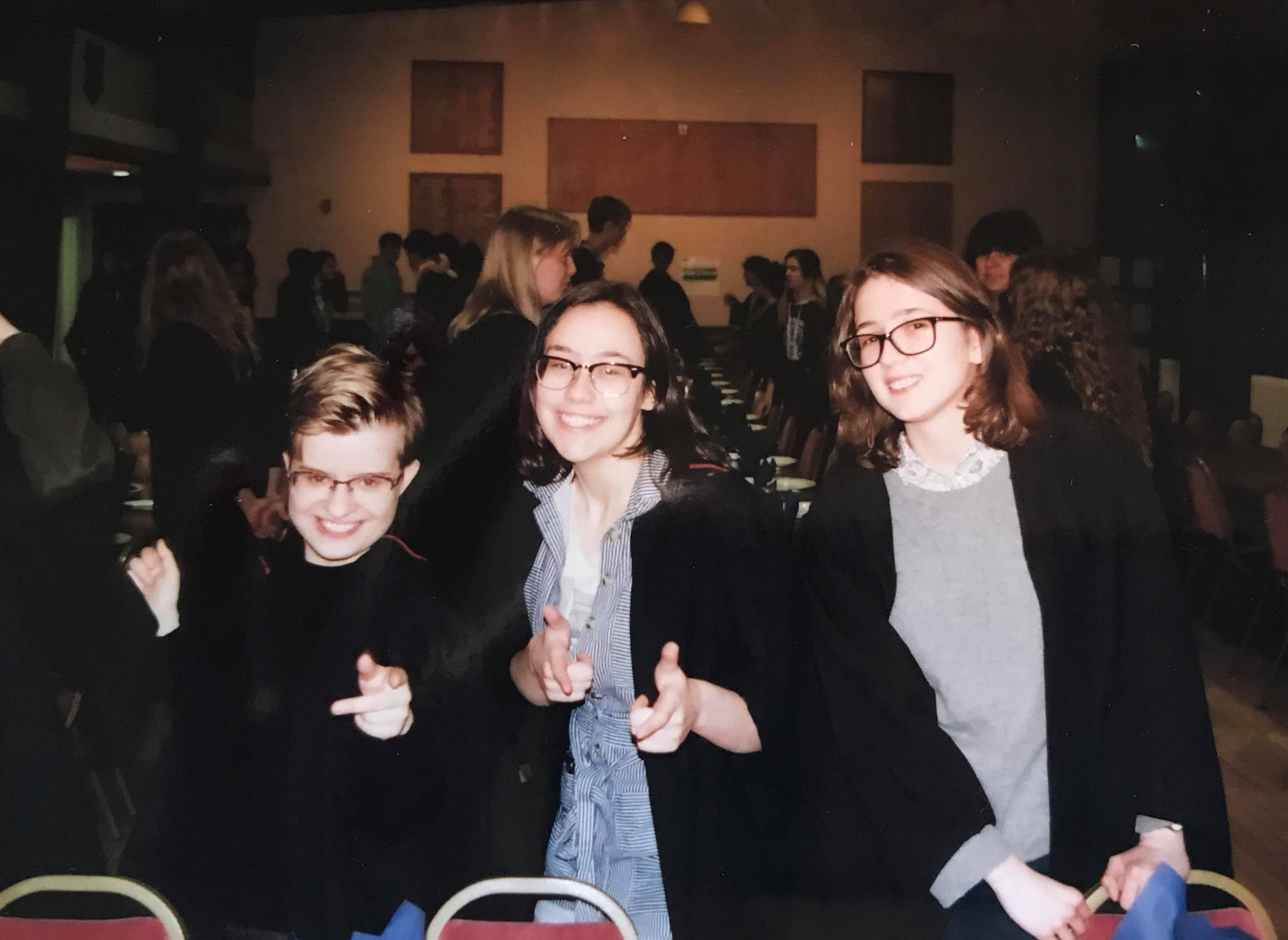
Students attending Communal Dinner

Communal dinner starts at 6:30 p.m., when the dining hall doors are opened by the catering staff. Once the JCR are stood behind their seats, the president makes any announcements and then instructs the student closest to the entrance to bang the serving spoon, which is done three times. This signifies to the warden and tutors that the JCR are ready for them. They then enter the dining room and process to the top table where the warden gives the traditional hall grace, Benedictus benedicat (May the Blessed One give a blessing). After he has done this, the hall sits and dinner begins. Typically, dinner lasts about an hour and includes three courses: a starter, a main, and a dessert. At the end of the meal the hall stands, and the Warden gives a closing grace, Benedicto benedicatur (Let praise be given to the Blessed One (if you believe Benedicto is dative); or Let a Blessing be given by the Blessed One (if you believe Benedicto is ablative)). The warden and the tutors process out of the dining hall and after this the rest of the hall also departs.

In addition to the usual communal dinner, the hall also holds several special dinners through the year including a Harry Potter themed meal and a Christmas dinner. At the Christmas meal the traditional hall toast, Floreat Aula Sanctus Anselmi (May St Anselm Hall flourish) is traditionally toasted, along with "The King, the Duke of Lancaster."

== Cellar Club ==
The Cellar Club is the onsite bar and is the self-titled cheapest bar in Manchester. This is mostly due to the fact that the bar is one of the last student-run bars in Manchester, and the staff are residents within the hall who volunteer their time there. Originally located within the snooker room in the open JCR, it was relocated under the dining hall and expanded under warden Smalley in the 1970s. The bar was renovated again in the 1990s to allow for a greater variety of socials.

These socials are organised by an elected representative within the hall. The events range from bar crawls to in-house events. There is also a weekly pub quiz run by students.

== Wardens ==
The warden had the responsibility over the welfare all of the residents in St Anselm Hall and was the point of contact between students and the university.

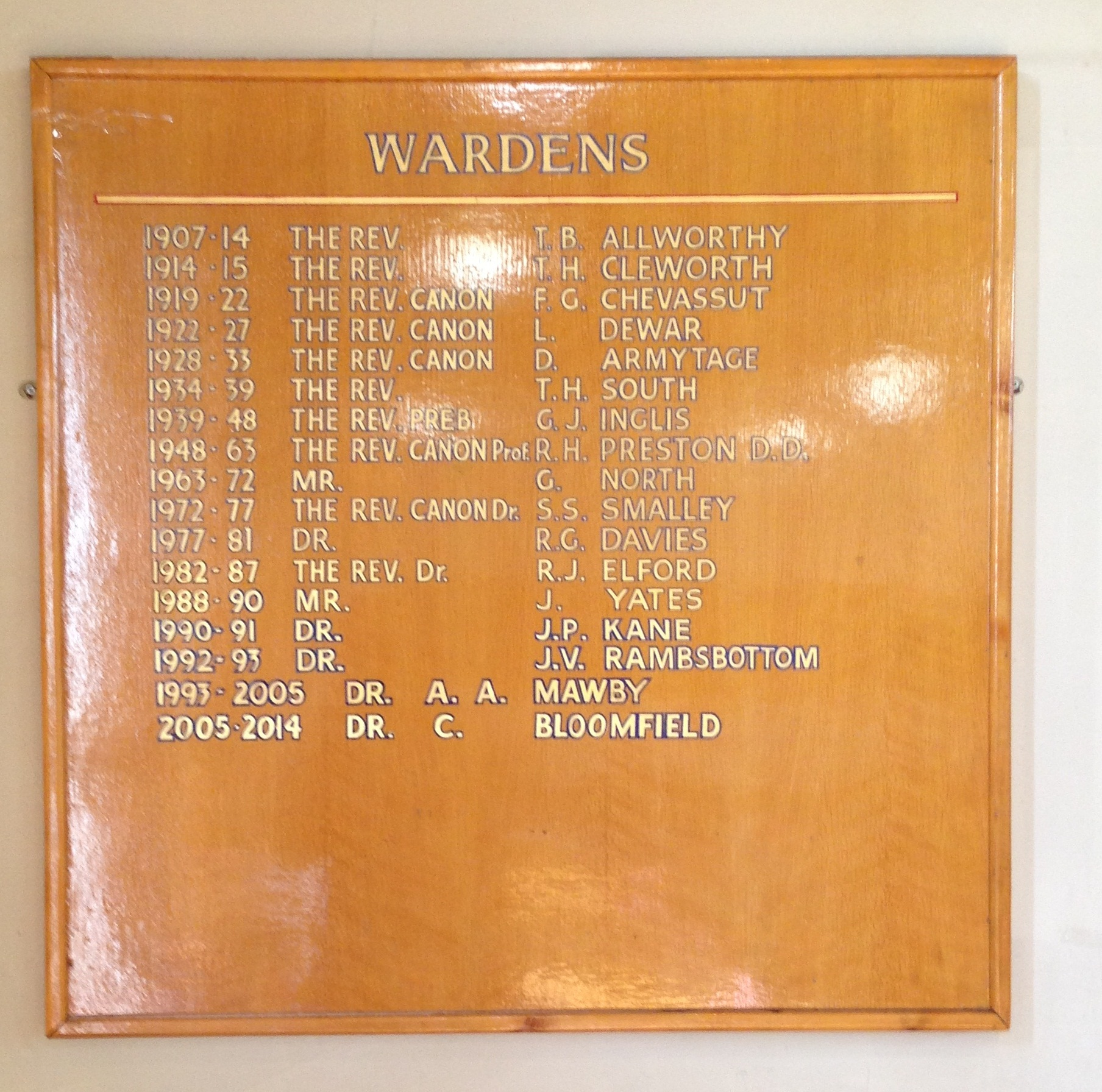
The Wardens Board in the Dining Hall

1907–1914 The Rev. T.B. Allworthy
1914–1915 The Rev. T.H. Cleworth
1919–1922 The Rev. Canon F.G. Chevassut
1922–1927 The Rev. Canon L. Dewar
1928–1933 The Rev. Canon D. Armytage
1934–1939 The Rev. T.H. South
1939–1948 The Rev. Preb G.J. Inglis
1948–1963 The Rev. Canon Prof R.H Preston D.D.
1963–1972 G. North
1972–1977 The Rev. Canon S.S. Smalley
1977–1981 Dr R.G. Davies
1982–1987 The Rev. Dr R.J. Elford
1988–1990 J. Yates
1990–1991 Dr J.P. Kane
1992–1993 Dr J.V. Ramsbottom
1993–2005 Dr A.A. Mawby
2005–2014 Dr C.E. Bloomfield
2014–2016 L. Turner
2016–2019 Dr B. Walker
2019–2020 Mr. M. Trow
2020–present Abolished

== Association & Scholarships ==
The history of the St Anselm Hall Association, the hall's alumni group, can be traced back to the 1930s, when the annual reunion dinner was first held. In the late 1940s, warden Ronald Preston and two of his senior students, Thomas Lawrenson and Lawrence Tremlett, (both themselves former residents) wrote to every old Anselmian, inviting them to a revived reunion dinner, the practice having fallen away during the war. This led to the formal establishment of the St Anselm Hall Association in 1954. The association is open to all former students, many of whom join on their departure from the hall. Since 2012, the association has also welcomed 'Associate Members', that is, those who did not live at St Anselm but nevertheless are linked to it in some way. Today the association, besides its annual summer reunion, hosts several events through the year including, amongst others, the London Dinner, Sports Day and Slemsiversity Challenge.

St Anselm Hall Association has long offered support to the activities of St Anselm Hall, with previous projects including the funding of the multi-gym, purchasing of sports equipment and, in the 2020–2021 session, supporting the 'JCR in Exile Society'.

The hall, in conjunction with the Alumni Association, also awards a number of scholarships to residents each year.

=== The Preston Scholarship ===
Named after the hall's eighth warden, Ronald Preston, the Preston Scholarship awards a minimum of £500 each year to one or more students who have made a significant contribution to hall life. Every recipient has their name recorded on an honours board in the dining hall. This scholarship, established in 2005, is awarded through a competitive application process. All submissions are reviewed by an independent sub-committee of St Anselm Hall alumni.

=== The Dyer Scholarship for Sports ===
The Scholarship for Sports, worth £400, is awarded to a returning student (a student who has previously lived in the hall) who has significantly contributed to the development of the hall's sporting activities. The Dyer Sports Scholarship is awarded at the beginning of the academic year and aims to empower and sustain the recipient to continue building a sports programme for the hall. The successful student is selected by the scholarship benefactor, Dr. Peter Dyer, in concert with the warden.

=== The Godley Scholarship for Music ===
The Scholarship for Music, worth £400, is awarded to a student who will direct the hall's musical life, especially in relation to musical activities within the setting of the hall chapel. The Godley Music Scholarship is awarded at the beginning of the academic year and aims to empower the recipient to accompany chapel services and other occasions where music is required. The successful student, titled the director of music, is selected by the scholarship benefactor, David Godley, in concert with the hall chaplain and warden. This scholarship was established in the 2019–20 academic year.

=== Prayer Book Society Choral Scholarships ===
The Prayer Book Society funds two Choral Scholarships, each worth £100 a year. The Choral Scholarships are awarded at the beginning of the academic year. These allow students to gain choral experience within the setting of a traditional hall chapel. The successful students are selected by a representative of the scholarship's benefactor, the Prayer Book Society, in concert with the hall chaplain, and the warden. This scholarship was established in 2020 with the first recipients being Jennifer Hewitt and Sing Liem.

== Notable Old Anselmians ==
Notable Old Anselmians include:

- Eric Laithwaite (1921–1997), electrical engineer and developer of maglev
- J. S. Roskell (1913–1998), medieval historian
- Han Jordaan Dutch secret agent
