= Michael Napier =

British lawyer

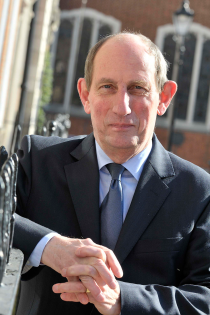

Michael Napier CBE KC is a former president of the Law Society and was the Attorney-General's pro bono envoy between 2001 and 2015. He was also the Chairman Emeritus of Harbour Litigation Ltd. He was voted ‘Lawyer of the Year’ in the 2012 Legal Business awards for his 30 years as a senior partner with leading practice Irwin Mitchell. Now retired, we was also a director of Michael Napier Consulting Ltd.

When Napier was appointed President of the Law Society in 2001 the Office of Fair Trading published its report on competition in the legal profession. This was followed by Sir David Clementi's report on regulation and the Government's white paper ‘Putting Consumers First’. The subsequent Legal Services Act 2007 introduced Alternative Business Structures (ABS) and established the Legal Services Board to which Napier was appointed in 2008.

Following the introduction of the Access to Justice Act in 1999 Napier was one of the initial appointees to the Civil Justice Council (CJC) on which he served for 10 years and co-authored a number of influential papers on the funding and costs of civil cases. As a consultant to the CJC he chaired the group that produced the Code of Conduct for third party litigation funders in 2011 and the CJC working party on contingency fees recommended by Lord Justice Jackson's report on civil litigation costs (to which Napier was an assessor) and now legalised by the Legal Aid Sentencing and Punishment of Offenders Act.

In 2009 Napier sued Private Eye over its coverage of his 2005 reprimand for dishonesty by the Solicitors Regulation Authority. Seeking an injunction on the information on the grounds that it breached his privacy, Napier lost the case on appeal with the justice ruling “It is singularly unattractive to argue that confidentiality should be recognised by the law in order to protect the interests of a solicitor against whom an adverse finding has been made.”
