= Joseph Gouge Greenwood =

British academic (1821–1894)

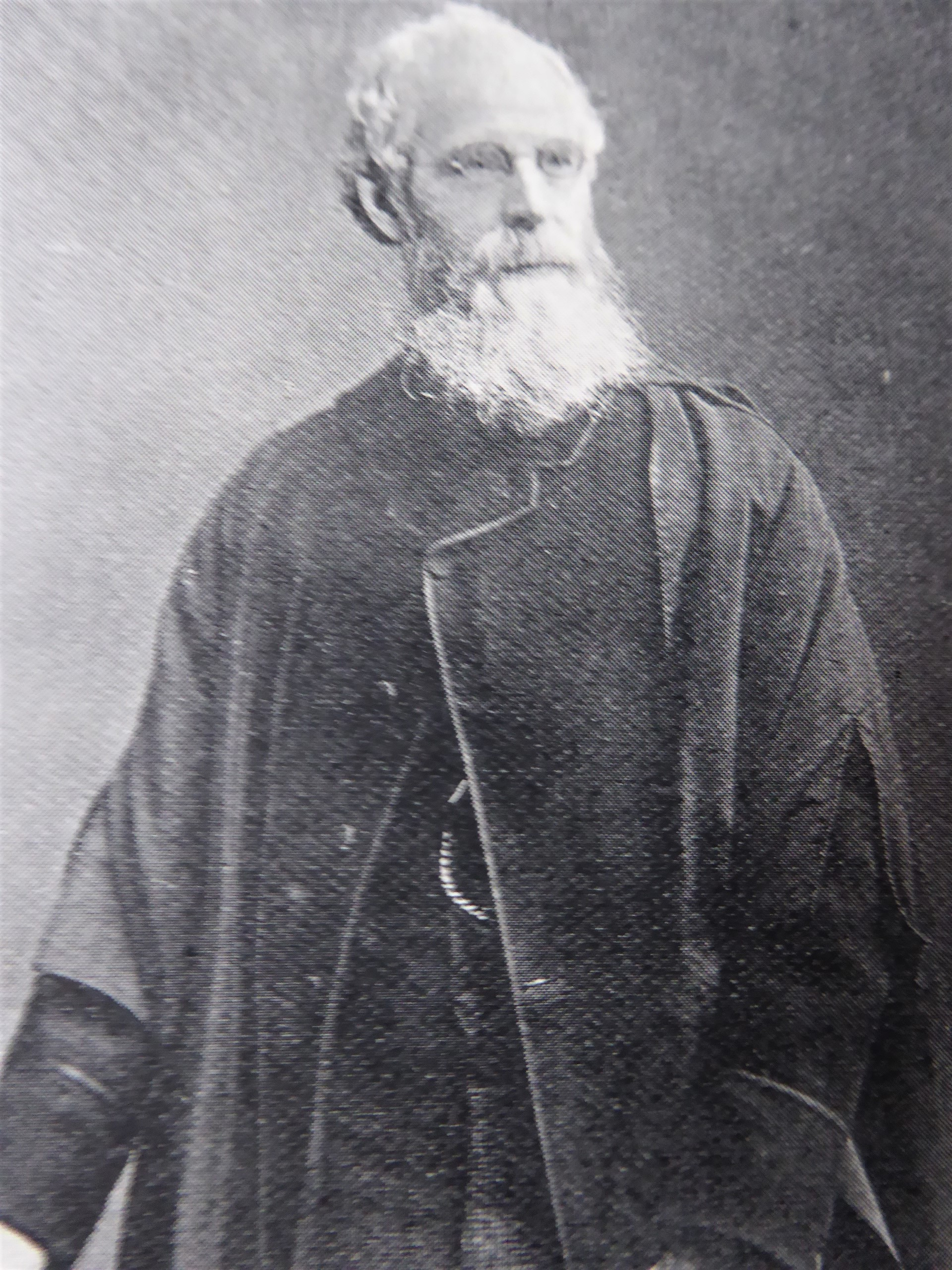
- Born: 1821
- Died: 25 September 1894 (aged 72–73); Eastbourne, England, United Kingdom of Great Britain and Ireland

Joseph Gouge Greenwood (1821 – 25 September 1894) was an English classical scholar, second principal of Owens College, Manchester, and vice-chancellor of the Victoria University, Manchester.

== Early life ==
He was the son of the Rev. Joseph Greenwood, a congregationalist minister at Petersfield, Hampshire, and his wife Maria, whose maiden name was Gouge. At the age of fourteen he was sent to University College School, of which Thomas Hewitt Key and Henry Malden had recently been appointed joint head-masters. He then went to University College as a student, and in 1840 he graduated B.A. in the University of London, with honours in both classics and mathematics, gaining the university scholarship classics.

In 1839 his father had died, leaving Greenwood responsible for a family of six younger children. For several years he supported himself and others by private tuition, and after a time as an assistant master in his old school; and he acted as substitute for Henry Malden in the Greek chair at University College. One of his earliest pupils was Edward Aldam Leatham, who dedicated to him his Charmione (1859).

== College principal ==
In 1850, Greenwood accepted the offer of the chair of classics and history in the newly founded Owens College at Manchester. The college's early days were difficult, and in July 1857 Greenwood was appointed to the principalship on the resignation of Alexander John Scott. Greenwood continued to lecture, but soon after his appointment as professor the subject of history had been assigned to Richard Copley Christie; Latin and classical Greek were later transferred to separate professors; and during the last few years Greenwood retained only the teaching of Greek Testament criticism.

In the earlier years of the College Greenwood advocated changes in the system of teaching, in order to recommend it to businessmen. In 1853 he helped in opening classes for the schoolmasters of primary schools; and having in 1858 become honorary secretary of a working-men's college on the same lines as that of the London college, opened a few years earlier under the influence of Frederick Denison Maurice, he was instrumental in bringing about its amalgamation, in 1861, with Owens College.

Within the next few years the scientific teaching of Sir Henry Roscoe and his colleagues improved the college's reputation; for his part Greenwood had an ally in Alfred Neild, who during most of his principalship presided over the governing body. In 1867–71 a new chapter in the history of the college began with the movement for its extension, in which, with Thomas Ashton and others, Greenwood took a prominent part, leading to rebuilding on a new site and expansion. On the opening of the new college buildings in 1873 the principal delivered an address 'On some Relations of Culture to Practical Life'. In 1872 the Manchester Medical School was incorporated with Owens College, after negotiations in which Greenwood displayed tact; and two years later the new medical buildings of the college were opened.

== Victoria University ==
Important events in the history of the college during the later years of Greenwood's official life were the admission of women students into the college and the foundation of the Victoria University. Greenwood opposed the higher education of women on the same lines as that of men, and objected (at all events as a rule) to joint or mixed classes; but the new Victoria University had opened its degrees to all comers without distinction of gender. Victoria University had a charter from 1880 with Owens College, however, remaining for four years its only college of the university.

Greenwood became the first vice-chancellor, holding the office till 1886 for three successive periods of two years. His caution at times conflicted with the policy upheld by the majority of his colleagues; and when the Victoria University became federal in fact by the admission of Liverpool University College and Yorkshire College, Leeds, he guarded the interests of Owens College.

Towards the close of 1889, in poor health, he resigned the principalship which he had held for thirty-seven years. Shortly afterwards he settled at Eastbourne, where he occupied himself with literary pursuits, including a revision of the text of William Wordsworth. He died at Eastbourne on 25 September 1894.

In 1873 the University of Cambridge conferred on Greenwood the honorary degree of LL.D., and in 1884 the University of Edinburgh, on the occasion of its tercentenary, bestowed upon him a similar honour.

== Works ==
His translation of The Pneumatics of Hero of Alexandria, edited by Bennet Woodcroft, appeared in 1851. The plan of his Elements of Greek Grammar (1857) was an attempt to supplement Hewitt Key's application of the 'crude-form system' to Latin grammar by completing Malden's fragmentary Greek grammar designed on the same principles.

== Family ==
He was twice married: first, to Eliza, the daughter of John Taylor, a Unitarian minister in Manchester. They had two daughters, the elder was the historian Alice Drayton Greenwood. His second wife was Katharine, daughter of William Langton who was a Manchester banker.
