= Ashburne Hall =

Listed hall of residence of the University of Manchester

- Ashburne Hall

General information
- Address: Old Hall Lane, Fallowfield, M14 6HP
- Coordinates: 53.44559°N 2.21503°W
- Year(s) built: 1910–1933

Design and construction
- Architect(s): Sir Percy Scott Worthington
- Designations

Listed Building – Grade II
- Official name: Ashburne Hall (Lees, Mary Worthington, Ward and Central block), including the Alice Barlow memorial gates and Ashburne Hall Lodge
- Designated: 8 June 2012
- Reference no.: 1401670

Website
- Official website

Ashburne Hall (to which Sheavyn House is an annex) is a University of Manchester hall of residence for students on the Fallowfield Campus, situated 2 miles (3.2 km) south of the main university campus (the Oxford Road Campus). The hall has catered accommodation offered to mainly undergraduate students, though some places are reserved for postgraduate students.

== History ==
Ashburne Hall was founded in 1900 by Samuel Alexander, R. D. Darbishire, C. P. Scott and Alice B. Cooke as a hall of residence for women students. (Two halls for men had already been founded in association with Owens College.) It was first located at Ashburne House in Victoria Park (donated by R. D. Darbishire for the purpose) and remained there until the removal to "The Oaks" (which was then renamed Ashburne Hall) in 1910. The new site was on Wilmslow Road at the corner of Old Hall Lane, Fallowfield.

By 1930 the hall had been extended by new buildings and enriched by the bequest from Lord Morley of his personal library. At a later date Sheavyn House was built in the grounds and commemorates Dr Sheavyn who had been the third warden of the hall.

Ashburne Hall became a Grade II listed building on 8 June 2012.

In 2023 the Ashburne Hall Archive was transferred to the University of Manchester Library. The archive contains many administrative documents, student publications, records and ephemera relating to student life at the Hall.

Norman Gillson is the current warden of Ashburne Hall.

== Notable students ==
- Alison Uttley (1884–1976), writer, who left money to support students at Ashburne Hall

== Notable staff ==
- Elizabeth French (1931–2021), former warden
- Barbara Gwyer (1881–1974), later principal of St Hugh's College, Oxford, was vice-warden of the hall from 1910 to 1916

== See also ==
- Listed buildings in Manchester-M14
