= Slattocks railway station =

Railway station in Castleton, Greater Manchester, England

Coordinates: 53.57097°N 2.17736°W

Slattocks is a proposed railway station in Castleton, Greater Manchester. It would be located between Mills Hill and Castleton in the Metropolitan Borough of Rochdale.

The station is a proposal by Transport for Greater Manchester to support land development at Stakehill. The station is considered as part of TfGM's "Rochdale-Station Alliance Enhancement Programme".
