= Norden, Greater Manchester =

Village in Rochdale, England

Coordinates: 53.627°N 2.214°W

Norden
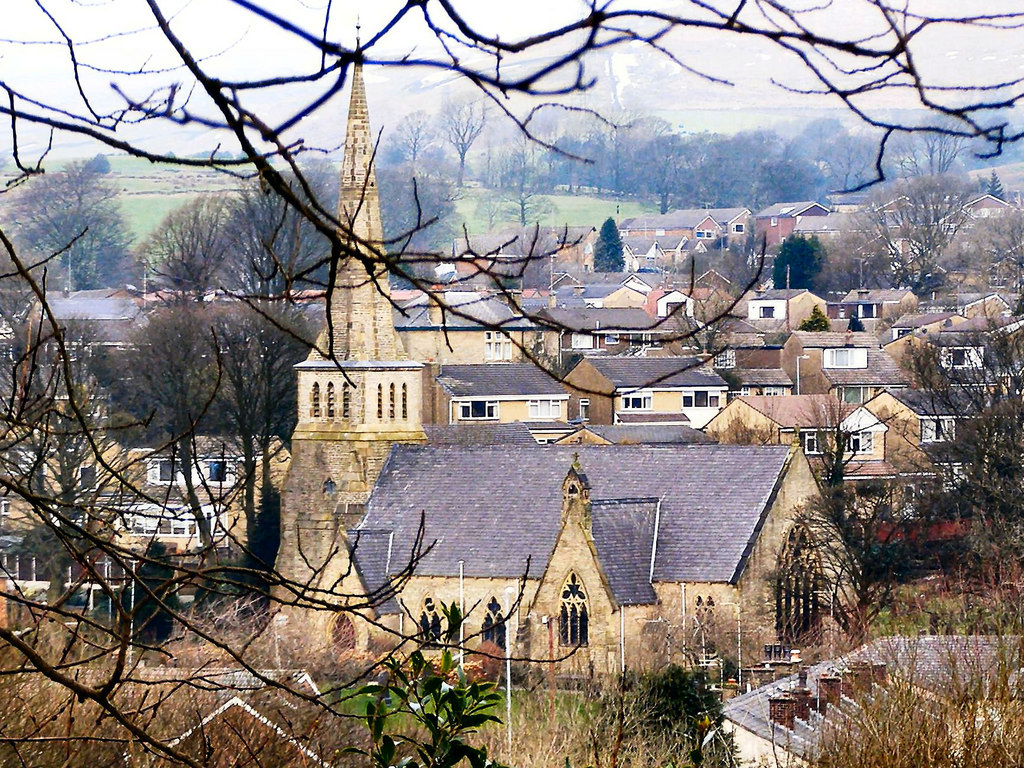
- St Paul's Church, Norden

- Location within Greater Manchester
- Population: 9,733 (2021)
- OS grid reference: SD858144
- Metropolitan borough: Rochdale
- Metropolitan county: Greater Manchester
- Region: North West
- Country: England
- Sovereign state: United Kingdom
- Post town: ROCHDALE
- Postcode district: OL11
- Dialling code: 01706
- Police: Greater Manchester
- Fire: Greater Manchester
- Ambulance: North West
- UK Parliament: Heywood and Middleton North

Norden is a village within the Metropolitan Borough of Rochdale, Greater Manchester, England. Historically part of Lancashire until the local government reorganisation of 1974, it lies on the western outskirts of Rochdale and had a population of 9,733 according to the 2021 census. The village is situated along the A680 Edenfield Road, which connects Rochdale to Edenfield in Rossendale.

== History ==
Norden originated as a chapelry in the ancient parish of Rochdale and was formed from part of the township of Spotland in the mid-19th century. The ecclesiastical parish of St Paul's was created in 1862, and the Grade II listed church was built between 1860 and 1861, featuring a spire and stained glass windows.

Under the Local Government Act 1894, Norden became an urban district and civil parish. In 1933 the urban district was abolished and merged with the County Borough of Rochdale and the Municipal Borough of Heywood. At that time, the parish covered over 5,000 acres (2,000 ha) and had a population of 4,348 in 1931.

Norden was part of Lancashire until the local government reorganisation of 1974, following the Local Government Act 1972, when it became part of the Metropolitan Borough of Rochdale in Greater Manchester.

== Geography ==
The village is situated on Edenfield Road (A680), which connects Rochdale town centre to Edenfield in Rossendale. The area includes Taylor Park, a green space located on a former mine shaft, making it unsuitable for development. The surrounding landscape features reservoirs such as Greenbooth and scenic valleys like Naden, popular for walking and wildlife.

== Demographics ==
Norden has a population of 9,733 (2021), with a mix of suburban housing and rural surroundings. Historically, the population grew from 2,662 in the 1870s to nearly 4,000 by the early 20th century, reflecting its development as an industrial and residential area.

== Economy ==
Norden was historically linked to textile mills and small-scale manufacturing in nearby hamlets such as Bagslate and Wolstenholme. Today, it functions largely as a commuter village for Rochdale and Manchester, with local businesses, pubs, and services.

== Transport ==
The village is served by the Bee Network bus route 17, which runs to Manchester via Rochdale and Middleton. The nearest railway stations are Rochdale (approximately 3 miles (4.8 km)) and Castleton. The A680 provides road access to the M62 motorway, linking Manchester and Leeds.

== Education ==
Local education includes primary schools such as Norden Community Primary School, while secondary education is accessed in Rochdale and surrounding areas. Independent schools like Manchester Grammar School and Bury Grammar School are within commuting distance.

== Governance ==
Norden ward is included in the Heywood and Middleton North constituency, represented in Parliament by Elsie Blundell (of the Labour Party). It was first contested at the 2024 general election. Before the election, the constituency was known as Heywood and Middleton.

At the local level, it is part of Rochdale Borough Council, which manages services such as planning, waste, and education.

== Sport ==
Norden is the home of Norden Cricket Club, who joined the Lancashire League in 2018.

== Notable citizens ==
- J. S. Roskell (1913–1998), medieval historian

== Gallery ==
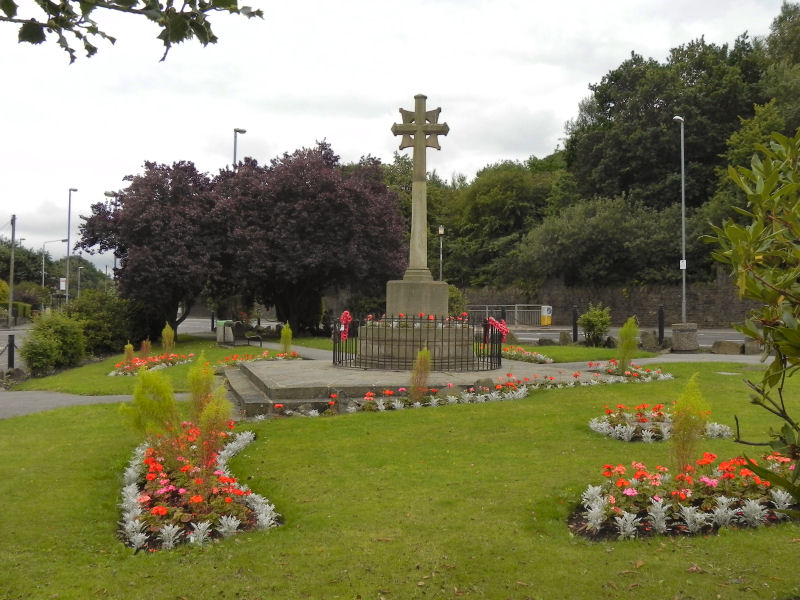
Norden war memorial

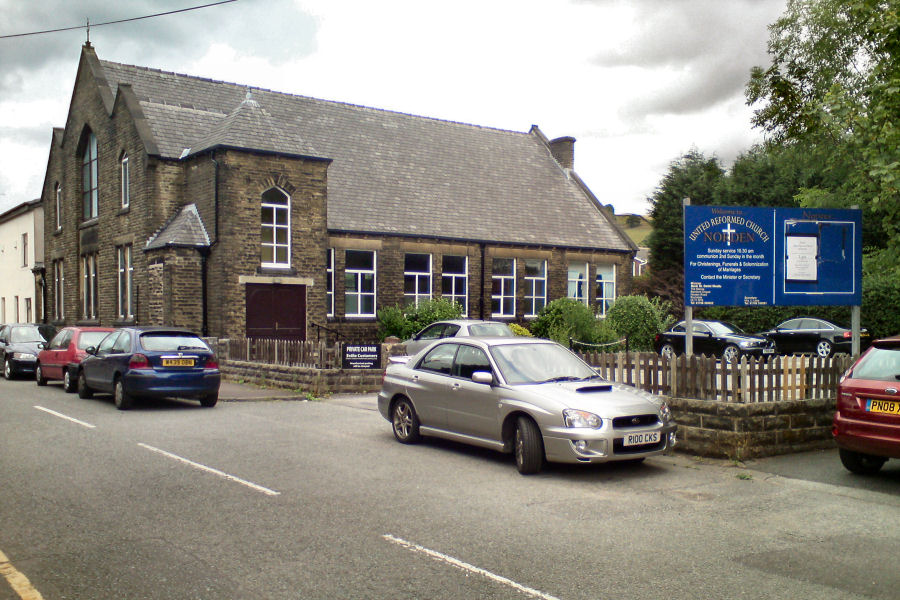
United Reformed Church, Norden

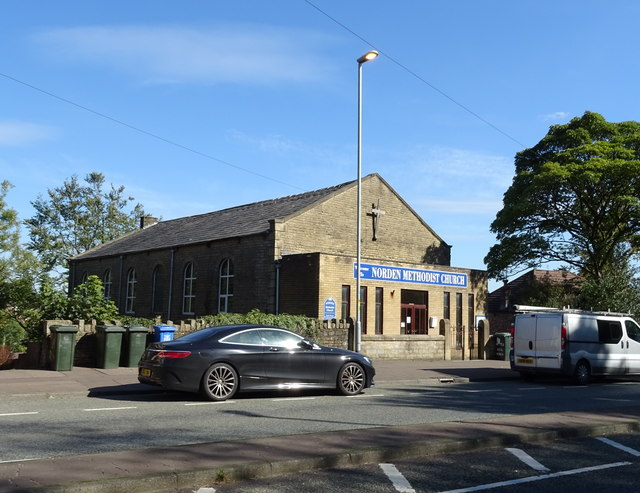
Norden Methodist Church

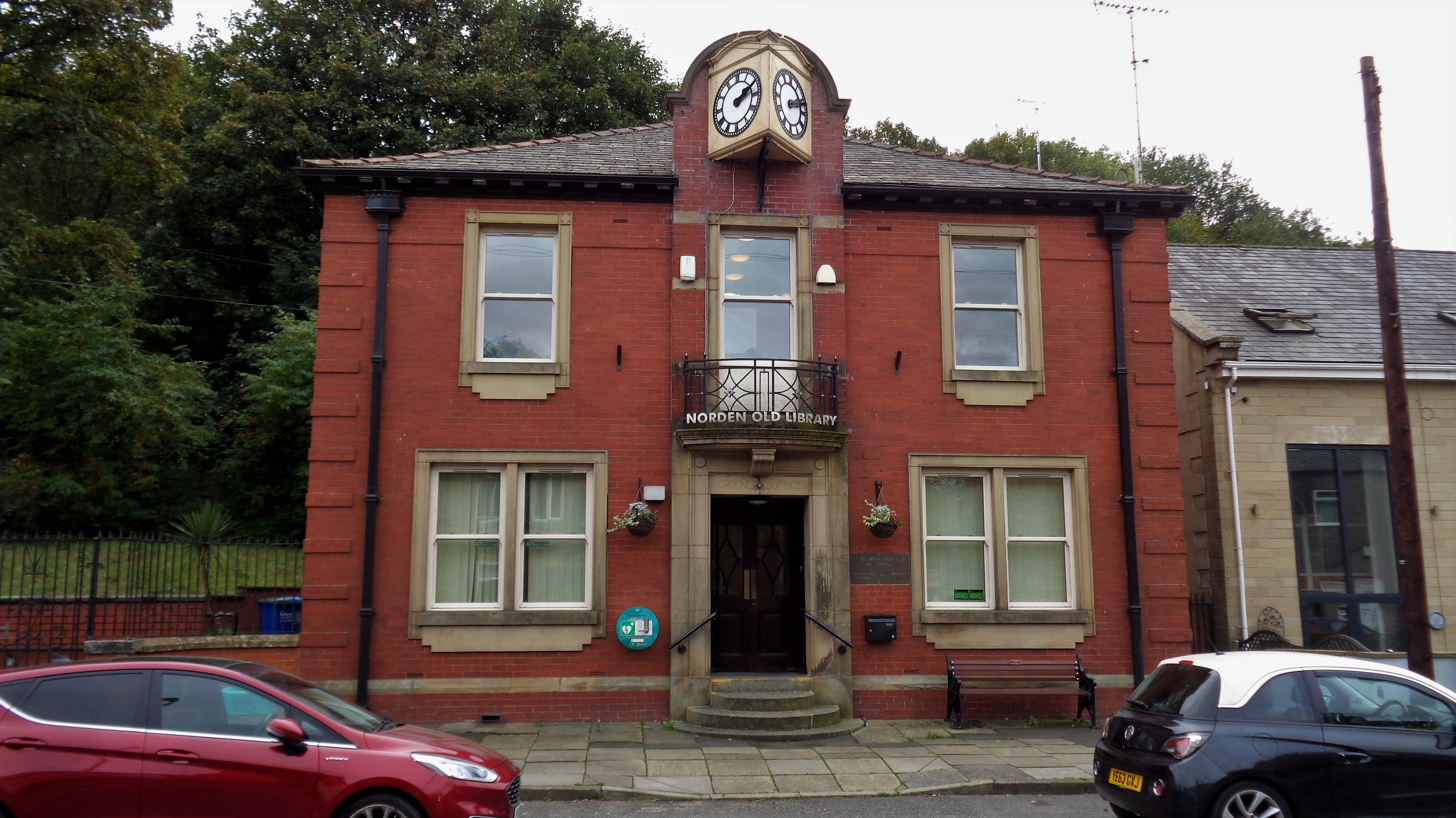
Norden Old Library

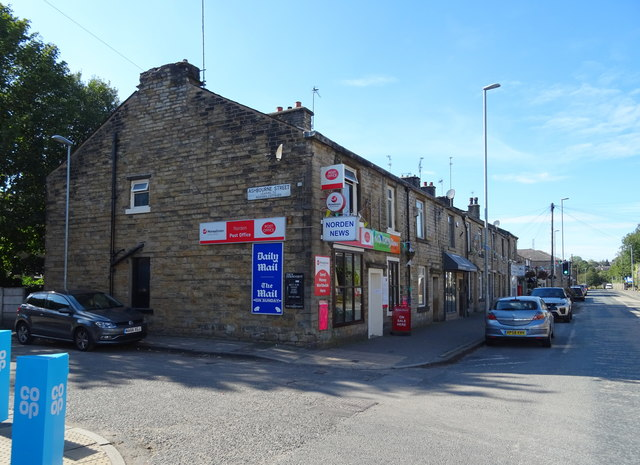
Norden Post Office

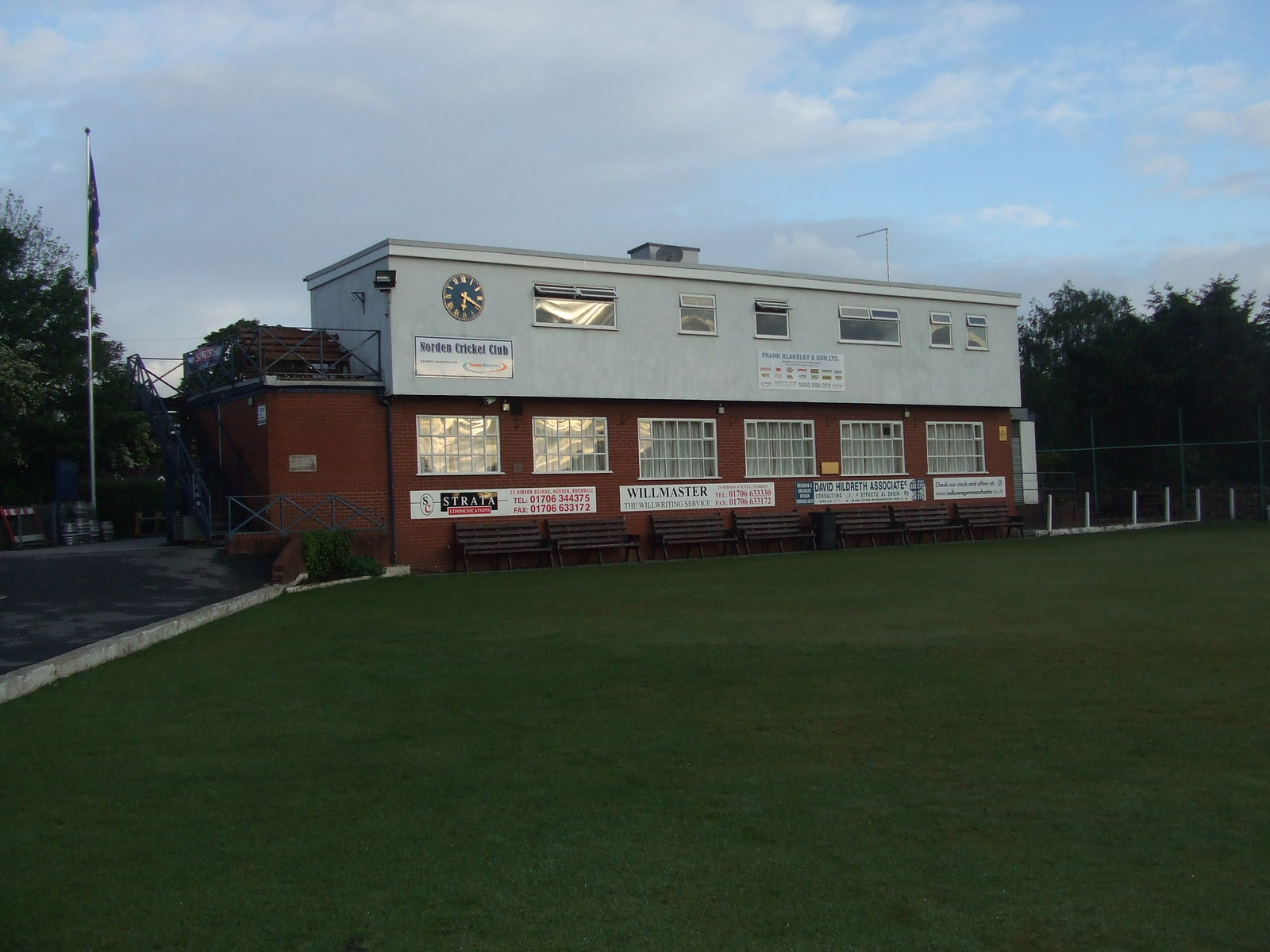
Norden Cricket Club pavillion
