= Broadfield railway station =

Disused railway station in England

Broadfield
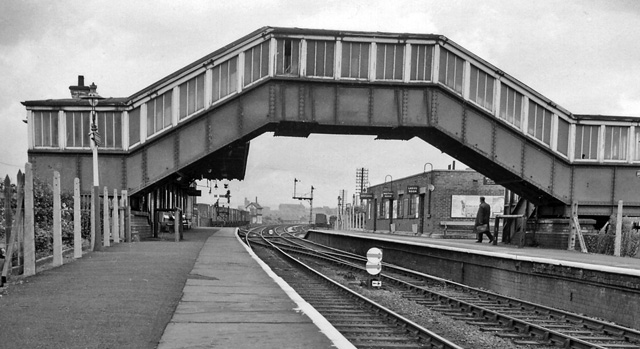
- The station in 1963

General information
- Location: Broadfield, Rochdale; England
- Coordinates: 53.58636°N 2.23024°W
- Grid reference: SD848100
- Platforms: 2

Other information
- Status: Disused

History
- Original company: Lancashire and Yorkshire Railway
- Pre-grouping: Lancashire and Yorkshire Railway
- Post-grouping: London, Midland and Scottish Railway

Key dates
- 13 September 1869: Opened
- 5 October 1970: Closed
Location

Broadfield railway station served the district of Broadfield in Heywood in Greater Manchester, England from 1869 until October 1970, when the station was closed and passenger services between Bolton & Rochdale were withdrawn by British Rail. The line through the station has since been reopened by the heritage East Lancashire Railway, although the station itself remains disused.

Preceding station	Disused railways	Following station
Heywood	Lancashire and Yorkshire Railway	Knowsley Street
