= Heywood Branch Canal =

Branch of Rochdale Canal

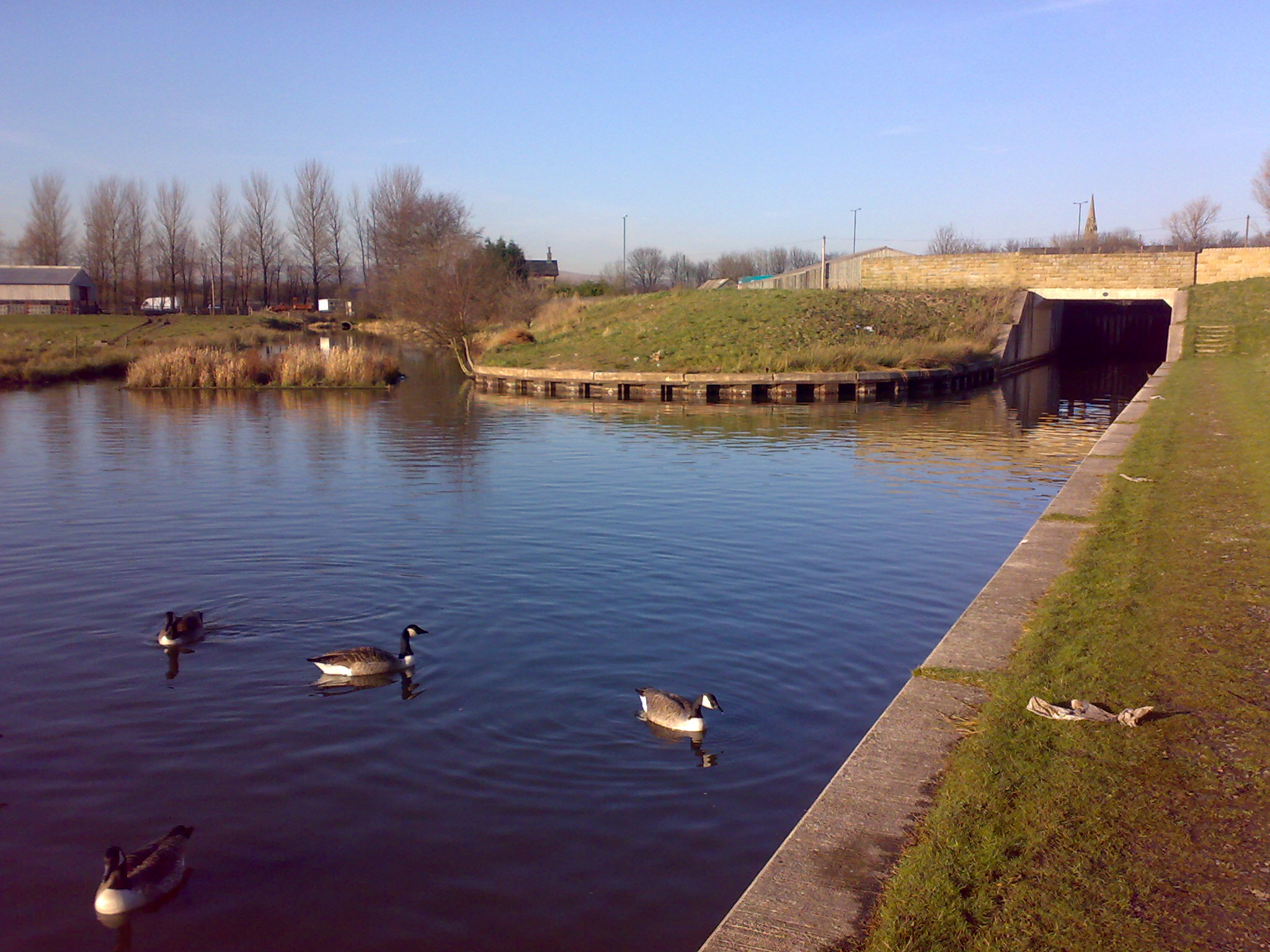
- The Rochdale Canal as it heads north under the M62 motorway. The branch was on the now disused route on the left.

Specifications
- Status: Abandoned

History
- Date of first use: 1834
- Date closed: 1952

Geography
- Start point: Heywood
- End point: Castleton
- Connects to: Rochdale Canal

The Heywood Branch Canal was a branch of the Rochdale Canal from Castleton which led to Heywood. It opened in 1834 and carried traffic until 1937. It was abandoned in 1952, along with most of the Rochdale Canal, and although the Rochdale Canal has been reopened, the junction lies under the embankments of the M62 motorway.

== History ==
The Rochdale Canal was opened on 21 December 1804, having taken ten years to build, and provided a trans-Pennine link between Manchester, where it connected with the Bridgewater Canal and Sowerby Bridge, where it connected with the Calder and Hebble Navigation. The estimated cost of £291,900 had overrun, with the final cost in the region of £600,000. Nevertheless, trade flourished and between 1827 and 1829, the canal carried 498,402 tons per year, which generated tolls of £36,794. With prospects good, the canal committee considered a branch to Heywood in August 1832, and then sought estimates of the cost of construction and the likely traffic. These were favourable, and the shareholders agreed to proceed at a meeting held on 3 August 1833. No Act of Parliament was obtained to authorise it, as they were able to buy all the land required without dispute. The branch was 1.5 miles (2.4 km) long, and was level. It terminated at a wharf in Heywood, where a warehouse had been built, and opened on 10 April 1834. The opening was performed by the committee, who travelled along the new canal in a boat called The Rochdale.

When the Manchester to Littleborough Railway opened in July 1839, the company ran a packet boat for passengers from Bluepits Station, in Castleton, to Heywood Wharf. The service lasted until late 1840, as the railway company was building a branch line which included a station at Heywood close to the terminal wharf. It opened in April 1841.

The branch was not used after 1937, and navigation rights on most of the Rochdale Canal, including the branch, were repealed by an Act of Parliament obtained in 1952.

== Route ==
The canal left the main line of the Rochdale Canal at Maden Fold Junction, opposite Maden Fold Farm, which was on the east bank. The towpath was also on the east bank and a swing bridge a little to the north of the junction gave access to the west bank. There was another swing bridge over the entrance to the Heywood Branch, although the towpath was on its north bank. The branch headed towards the west in a straight line, passing through the embankment of the London Midland and Scottish Railway, just below the point where the Castleton South Fork turned off from the main line. The modern M62 motorway passes under the railway at the same point. The canal continued to the south of the motorway route, and then turned to the north west, to reach a bridge at Hope Street.

Ley farm was situated below the bridge on the west side. Hope Street gave access to the towpath, but did not continue any further once it had crossed the canal. To the north of the bridge, again on the west side, was Hope Mill. This is marked as a cotton mill in 1893 and 1929, but was disused in 1937 and had been demolished by 1956. High Street Cotton Mill was located on the same side in 1893, just before Canal Street bridge. It had become cabinet manufactory called Excelsior Works by 1910, and remained so in 1929, but like Hope Mill was disused in 1937 and demolished in 1956. Between Canal Street Bridge and Green Lane Bridge were Bridge Mill, a cotton mill from 1893 until 1929, and Park Street Mill, just called Cotton Mill in 1893, and again active in 1929. The site of both had been cleared by 1937, and turned into allotment gardens by 1956.

Opposite Park Street Mill, on the towpath side, was Sefton Mill, with the Phoenix Brewery behind it. The mill was called Globe Mill in 1893, and marked as a cotton mill subsequently. The mill was disused by 1937, and by 1956 had been demolished, by which time the brewery was disused. The final section of the canal between Green Lane Bridge and the terminal wharf had five cotton mills on the west side, and the Sun Iron Works on the east side. The mills were Albert Mill, Gregge Street Mill, Princess Mill, Victoria Mill and Twin Mill, and all were operational in 1893, 1910 and 1927. By 1937 the first two were disused, but in 1956 Albert Mill was manufacturing furniture while Gregge Street Mill had become a chemical works. The other three mills were still working in 1956, as was the Sun Iron Works. Near the end of the canal, on the north-west corner of the iron works, was a wider section of canal, to allow boats to turn, beyond which there was a crane on either side of the canal and a covered wharf building. A third crane is shown on the 1956 map.

== Current status ==
A large portion of the canal survives although is dry along the whole route. The junction with the Rochdale canal has been lost with the building of the M62. The canal emerges and runs south of the motorway for roughly 500 meters before turning north where the motorway severs it. The canal then runs north of the motorway toward Hope Street. It passes through the site of Hope Street Bridge that has been demolished and filled in.

The canal is infilled from this point and runs under a field until it reaches Canal Street. The bridge here has been demolished. The canal from here is lost beneath a small industrial estate although the route can be seen in maps. Green lane Bridge has been lost after the road was widened although the road was never lowered, leaving a hump in the road. The canal route is shown by a road between two buildings parallel to Sefton Street until it reaches the Wharf at Quay Street. The wharf can still be seen, although infilled and is used as a car park.

The re-opened Rochdale Canal no longer passes through the site of the junction, as the cost of building a navigable culvert through the M62 embankment would have been prohibitive. Instead, the canal was routed through a farm access culvert, and a new access road was built to serve the farm. As the culvert was somewhat higher than required, lock 53 was moved from the north side of the motorway to the south side. Heywood railway station is now part of the preserved East Lancashire Railway, although it is situated slightly further to the east, nearer to the former wagon works, than it was when the canal was open.

== Points of interest ==
Point	Coordinates (Links to map resources)	OS Grid Ref	Notes
Heywood Wharf	53.5890°N 2.2099°W	SD862102	Terminus
Green Lane Bridge	53.5867°N 2.2071°W	SD863100	
Canal Street Bridge	53.5849°N 2.2045°W	SD865098	
Hope Street Bridge	53.5831°N 2.2018°W	SD867096	
Route cut by M62 motorway	53.5811°N 2.1969°W	SD870094	
Railway Bridge	53.5839°N 2.1809°W	SD881097	
Start of Branch	53.5843°N 2.1784°W	SD882097	Rochdale Canal

== See also ==
- Canals of the United Kingdom
- History of the British canal system

== Bibliography ==
- Dean, Richard (2001). Canals of Manchester (a historical map). M & M Baldwin. ISBN 978-0-947712-12-9.
- Hadfield, Charles; Biddle, Gordon (1970). The Canals of North West England, Vol 2 (pp.241-496). David and Charles. ISBN 978-0-7153-4992-2.
- Nicholson (2006). Nicholson Guides Vol 5: North West and the Pennines. Harper Collins. ISBN 978-0-00-721113-5.
