= Greenbooth Reservoir =

Reservoir in Rochdale, England

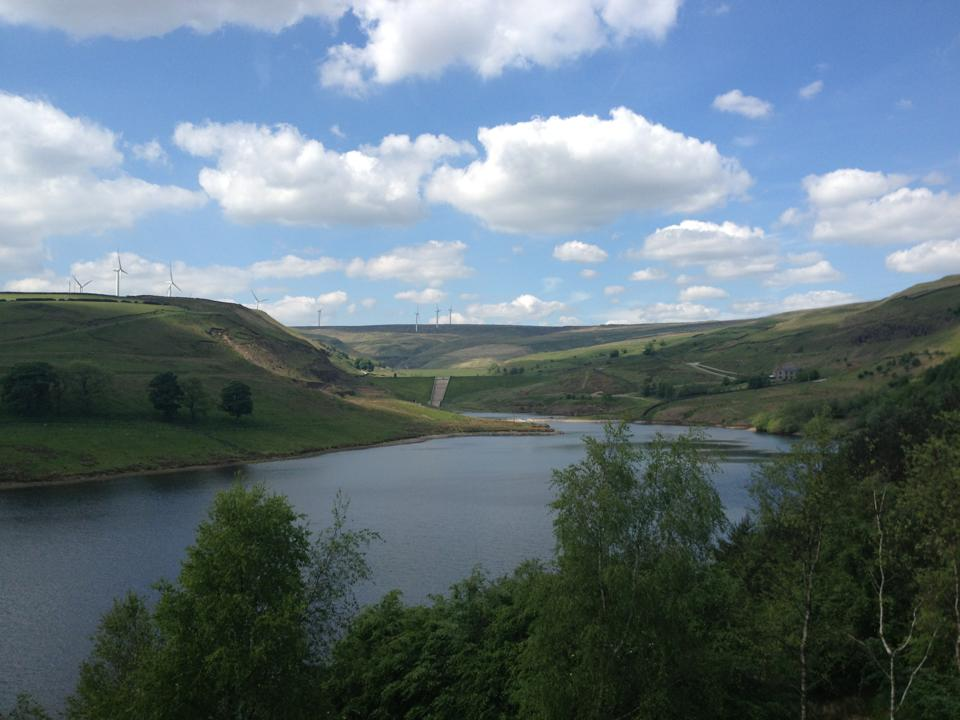
- The reservoir in 2013

- Location within Greater Manchester
- Location: Rochdale, Greater Manchester, England
- Coordinates: 53°38′14″N 2°13′07″W
- Type: Reservoir
- Basin countries: United Kingdom
- Built: c. 1959–1961; 65 years ago August 1965; 61 years ago (opened)
- Water volume: 700×10^{6} imp gal (2,600 acre⋅ft)

Greenbooth Reservoir is a reservoir to the north of Heywood and close to Norden in the Metropolitan Borough of Rochdale, within Greater Manchester, England.

== History ==
In 1846 Heywood Waterworks Company finished constructing the Naden Reservoirs (Lower Naden, Middle Naden and Higher Naden) in the valley above the village of Greenbooth. By the 1950s, the village consisted of around 80 cottages, a sweet shop, a Co-op store and a school. There was also a woollen mill.

In 1958 the Heywood and Middleton Water Board decided that another reservoir was needed to supply water to the growing population of Rochdale and started construction of Greenbooth Reservoir that same year. It took over two years to build, with the village abandoned, mostly demolished and then submerged. The reservoir was completed in 1961 and officially opened in August 1965.

The only visible reminder of Greenbooth village today is a plaque on the side of the reservoir dam wall which reads: "This tablet commemorates the village of Greenbooth, the site of which is submerged beneath the waters of this reservoir".

In 2026 the Greenbooth to Ashworth Moor pipeline received the Institution of Civil Engineers North West Small Project Award for schemes under £5 million. The emergency scheme was delivered after the exceptionally dry spring of 2025 left Ashworth Moor Reservoir, Rochdale's main supply, at risk of running out of water. Engineers from United Utilities, Stantec and Avove Utilities designed and built a 2-kilometre (1.2 mi) pipeline, floating pumping station and associated treatment works in four months, using an abandoned culvert for part of the route to reduce environmental impact. Once operational, the project enabled reservoir levels to recover and maintained supplies during the prolonged dry weather.

== Location ==
The four reservoirs sit in a quiet area suitable for country walks, with distant views towards Manchester. Some of the wind turbines at Scout Moor Wind Farm are also visible from the surrounding paths.
