= Hopwood, Greater Manchester =

Coordinates: 53.582128°N 2.203179°W

Hopwood
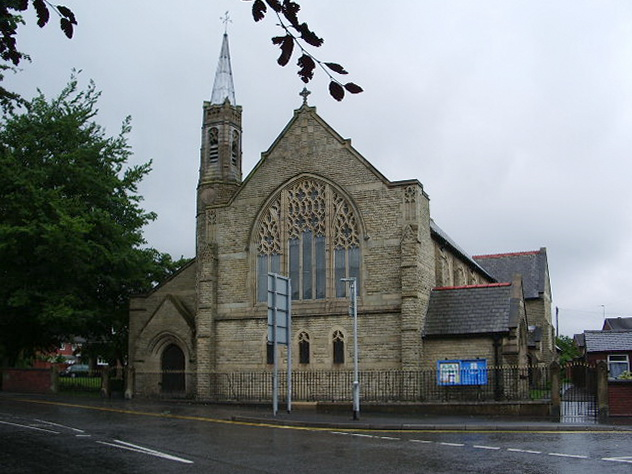
- St John the Evangelist

- Location within Greater Manchester
- OS grid reference: SD865095
- Metropolitan borough: Rochdale
- Metropolitan county: Greater Manchester
- Region: North West
- Country: England
- Sovereign state: United Kingdom
- Post town: HEYWOOD
- Postcode district: OL10
- Dialling code: 01706
- Police: Greater Manchester
- Fire: Greater Manchester
- Ambulance: North West
- UK Parliament: Heywood and Middleton

Hopwood is a suburb of Heywood, a town within the Metropolitan Borough of Rochdale, in Greater Manchester, England. It is north of the M62 motorway. Hopwood has a primary school and a fire station for the Greater Manchester Fire and Rescue Service. It also has a dentist, petrol station/shop and a cafe.

== History ==
During the Middle Ages, Hopwood formed a township within the Middleton ecclesiastical parish of the Salfordshire hundred of Lancashire. In 1866 Hopwood became a separate civil parish, in 1894 the parish was abolished to form Heywood, parts also went to Middleton and Castleton by Rochdale. In 1891 the parish had a population of 4774.

John Rhodes was one of the victims of the Peterloo Massacre of 1819. He died several weeks after the event and his body was dissected by order of magistrates wishing to prove his death was not a result of Peterloo.

== Transport ==
Hopwood is served by a number of buses including the 163 (Bury-Manchester), 475 (Heywood-Bury) and 125 (Heywood-Middleton).

Hopwood is also a short distance from Heywood railway station which is part of the East Lancashire Railway.
