= Crimble Mill =

Listed building in Heywood, Greater Manchester, England

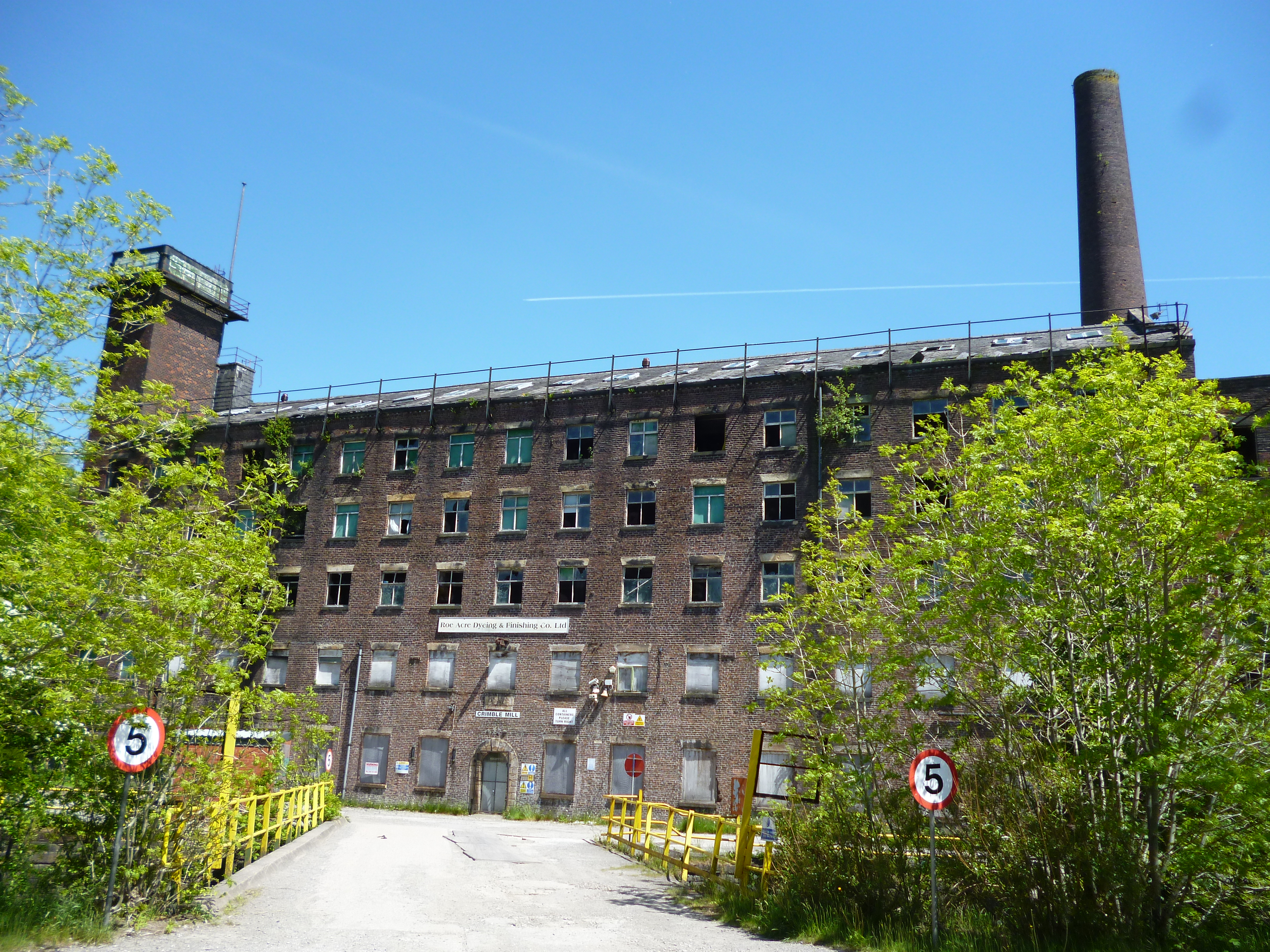
- The building in 2013

- Location within Greater Manchester

General information
- Type: Textile mill (former)
- Location: Crimble Lane, Heywood, Greater Manchester, England
- Coordinates: 53.6013°N 2.2056°W
- Years built: c. 1825 (mill); 1850s (engine house and fire-proof warehouse); 1880s (warehouse)
- Renovated: 1886 (renovated)
- Closed: 2002
- Client: Charles Stott (c. 1825)

Listed Building – Grade II*
- Official name: Crimble Mill: spinning mill, attached engine house and fire-proof warehouse, and attached warehouse
- Designated: 15 December 1967
- Reference no.: 1187124

Listed Building – Grade II
- Official name: Crimble Mill: mill chimney
- Designated: 2 August 2019
- Reference no.: 1464917

Crimble Mill is a Grade II* listed former textile mill on Crimble Lane in Heywood, a town within the Metropolitan Borough of Rochdale, Greater Manchester, England. Historically part of Lancashire, it was built in the early 19th century for cotton spinning and later adapted for wool production. Vacant since 2002, the mill is on Historic England's Heritage at Risk Register following years of deterioration, including a partial roof collapse in 2019. A major redevelopment approved in 2023 aims to restore the building for residential and commercial use.

== History ==
Crimble Mill originated as a water-powered fulling mill established by Richard Kenyon around 1761 on the River Roch in Heywood. The site remained in Kenyon family ownership for several decades, with cotton spinning machinery introduced in 1803.

In 1821 the mill was destroyed during a storm, which also demolished an adjoining cottage and killed the family living there. At the time, rebuilding work was underway, but following the disaster and the death of John Kenyon, a cousin and owner, in early 1822, the estate passed to executors and was put up for auction. With no male heirs to inherit, the property was eventually sold to Charles Stott, who rebuilt the mill as a cotton spinning facility.

Steam power was added by the mid-19th century, and an engine house, fireproof warehouse, and chimney were constructed during this period. The Kenyon family repurchased the site in 1859, forming the Crimble Cotton Spinning Company Limited. By the 1880s, the mill had been converted to integrated woollen production under James Kenyon & Son, with significant alterations including new sheds, warehouses, and sprinkler systems.

Further expansions occurred in the early 20th century, including a large north-light shed in around 1902 and a new power system in 1924 featuring a Musgrave engine. Additional sheds and structural modifications were made in the 1930s and 1940s, along with the establishment of a research laboratory.

On 15 December 1967, Crimble Mill was designated a Grade II* listed building. In 1968 James Kenyon & Son was sold to Albany Felt Company, and later Roeacre Dyeing and Spinning operated on the site until closure in 2002.

Much of the complex has remained vacant since, and in June 2019 part of the roof of the 1850s fireproof warehouse collapsed, prompting emergency stabilisation works.

=== Redevelopment ===
The mill buildings and surrounding land were acquired by a property investment and development company in September 2015. A planning application to restore Crimble Mill and redevelop the site was submitted to Rochdale Council in July 2022.

In August 2023, the redevelopment scheme received approval. The project aims to restore the mill and convert its upper floors into residential apartments, with the ground floor adapted for commercial and community use. The proposals also include the demolition of non-listed structures, restoration of the mill pond and leat, flood alleviation works, and improvements to Crimble Lane and public rights of way.

The wider site will be redeveloped to provide more than 200 homes. The scheme incorporates landscape enhancements, ecological improvements, and infrastructure upgrades such as a new road bridge and surface water balancing ponds. The development was justified as "very special circumstances" to permit partial building on green belt land, with the restoration of the heritage asset cited as a key benefit.

The mill, which has been vacant for over two decades and is listed on Historic England's Heritage at Risk Register, is considered to be at "immediate risk of further rapid deterioration or loss of fabric".

== Architecture ==
The mill is constructed mainly from brick with stone dressings and topped with Welsh slate roofs. The principal mill range consists of four interconnected buildings arranged in a north–south alignment along a narrow strip of land between the River Roch and the site of a former reservoir.

Several notable structures are attached to the main range, including an engine house and a fireproof warehouse dating from the 1850s, a northern warehouse added in the 1880s, and a prominent chimney, which is listed separately at Grade II.

The complex as a whole reflects the progression of textile manufacturing technologies, evolving from water-powered cotton spinning to steam-powered wool production. Its architectural importance lies in its considerable scale, the use of fireproof construction methods, and the integration of ancillary buildings that typify 19th-century textile mills.

== Gallery ==
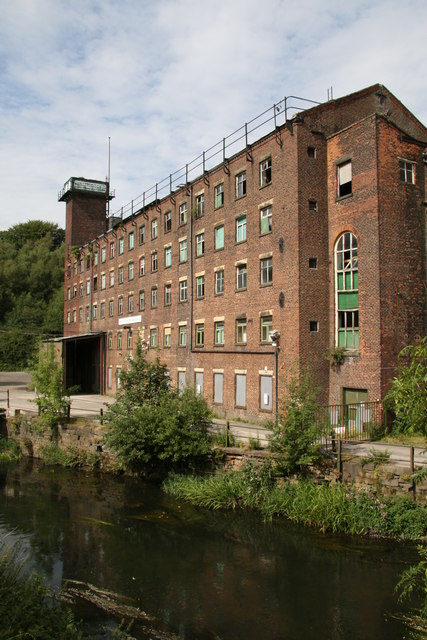
Crimble Mill in 2006

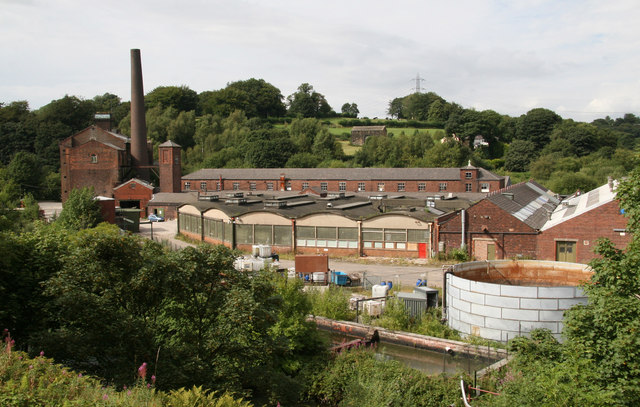
The mill from the approach road, 2006

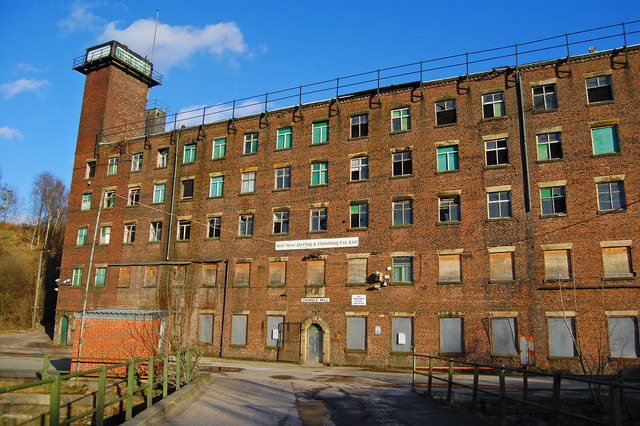
Crimble Mill in 2008

== See also ==
- Grade II* listed buildings in Greater Manchester
- Listed buildings in Heywood, Greater Manchester
