= Malcolm Taylor (cricketer) =

English cricketer

Malcolm Lees Taylor (16 July 1904 – 14 March 1978) was an English cricketer active from 1924 to 1931 who played for Lancashire. He was born in Heywood, Lancashire and died in Wimborne Minster. He appeared in 96 first-class matches as a lefthanded batsman, scoring 2,216 runs with a highest score of 107* and held 42 catches.
