= Church of St Luke, Heywood =

Listed church in Greater Manchester, England

- St Luke's Church, Heywood
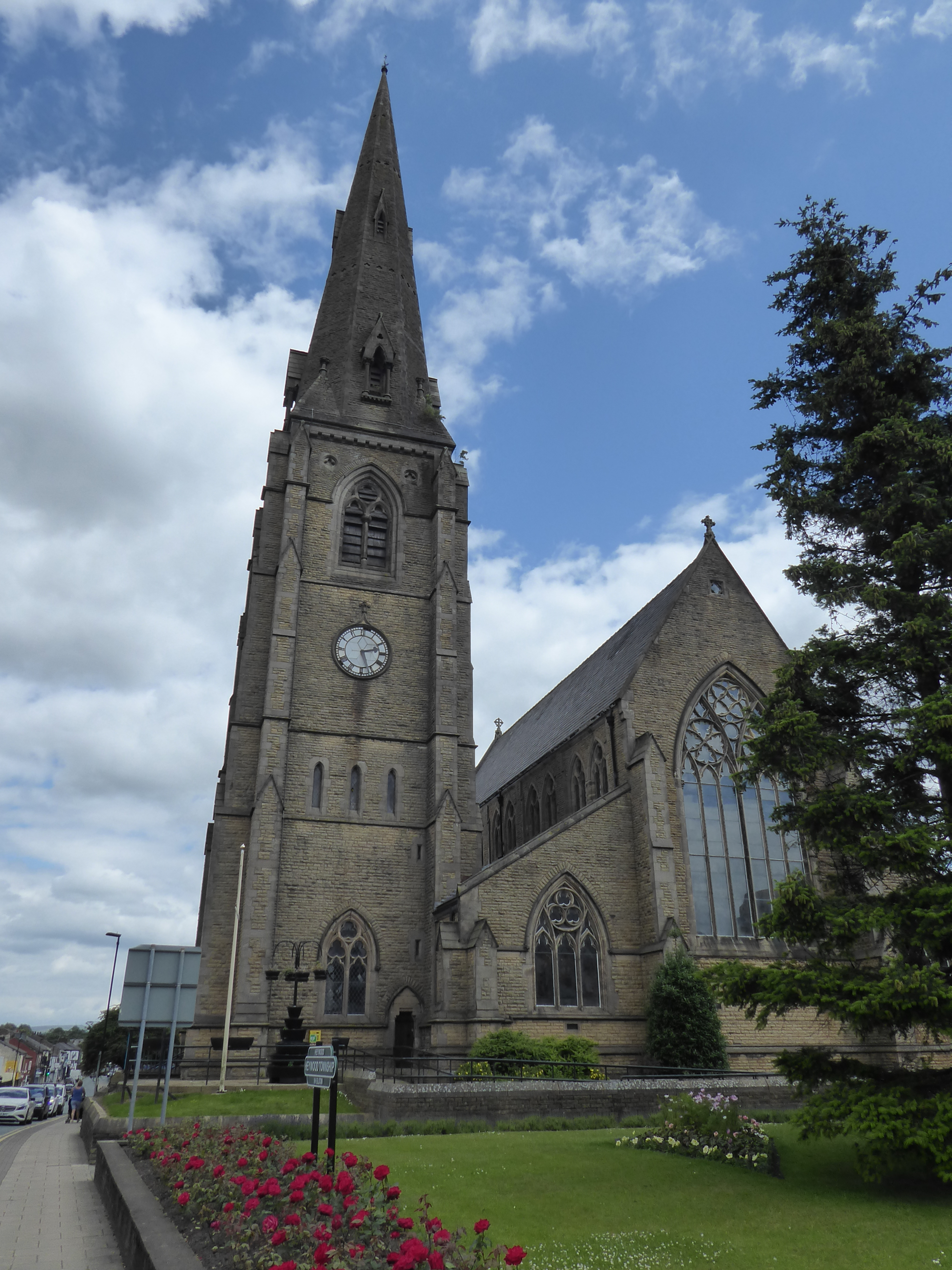
- The church in 2019

- Location in Greater Manchester
- 53.5933°N 2.2185°W
- OS grid reference: SD 85637 10769
- Address: York Street, Heywood, Greater Manchester
- Country: England
- Denomination: Anglican
- Website: stlukesheywood.org.uk

History
- Dedication: St Luke
- Consecrated: 18 October 1862; 163 years ago

Architecture
- Heritage designation: Grade II*
- Designated: 12 February 1985
- Architect: Joseph Clarke
- Architectural type: Church
- Style: Decorated Gothic
- Years built: 1860–1862; 164 years ago

Specifications
- Materials: Stone, ashlar, slate

Administration
- Archdiocese: Archdeaconry of Rochdale
- Diocese: Diocese of Manchester

Clergy
- Priest: Rev Kirsty Screeton

The Church of St Luke is an Anglican parish church on York Street in Heywood, a town within the Metropolitan Borough of Rochdale, Greater Manchester, England. It is an active church in the Diocese of Manchester and is recorded in the National Heritage List for England as a Grade II* listed building. Designed by the architect Joseph Clarke and built between 1860 and 1862, the church has an 188-foot (57 m) tower with a spire that forms one of the town's most recognisable landmarks.

== History ==
The origins of the Church of St Luke lie in the early modern period, when a chapel at Heywood served the dispersed rural population of the township. A chapel is recorded in 1552, and by 1640 it had been rebuilt by Robert Heywood, a member of the local landowning family. This early chapel functioned as a chantry and later as a chapel of ease within the parish of Bury, providing local worship long before Heywood's rapid industrial expansion.

By the mid‑19th century, Heywood had transformed into a major cotton‑manufacturing town, and the modest 17th‑century chapel could no longer accommodate the growing population. In 1859 the old chapel was demolished to make way for a new, architecturally ambitious building funded through an appeal for public subscription.

The present Church of St Luke was constructed between 1860 and 1862. Designed in the Decorated Gothic style, the new church was built at a cost of more than £10,000; a significant sum for the period. The foundation stone was laid on 31 May 1860, and the building was constructed of stone from Yorkshire and ashlar from Staffordshire and Bath. It consists of a nave 80 feet (24 m) long and 24 feet (7.3 m) wide, aisles, and a chancel measuring 42 feet (13 m) by 22 feet (6.7 m). The building also includes a private mortuary chapel, richly ornamented with coloured marble and alabaster, and a detached tower with a spire 188 feet (57 m) tall. (Note: Another source states the height of the spire as 185 feet (56 m).)

It was consecrated on 18 October 1862 by James Prince Lee, the first bishop of Manchester.

On 12 February 1985, the Church of St Luke was designated a Grade II* listed building.

Today, the church remains a central landmark in Heywood and continues to serve as an active parish church. Its Victorian structure, combined with its much older ecclesiastical origins, makes it a significant element of Heywood's architectural and cultural heritage.

== Architecture ==
The church is constructed in coursed rock‑faced stone with dressings of ashlar, and slate roofs. The composition includes a tall nave with an aisle and clerestory, a north‑west steeple positioned outside the north aisle, and a south‑west porch, together with a chancel incorporating a clerestory, a vestry, and side chapels. The nave is arranged in five bays and features coupled two‑light geometrical clerestory windows set within recessed panels, three‑light aisle windows, a sill band with weathering, and gabled, weathered buttresses. The porch contains a coped gable and a detailed niche. The four‑stage tower is designed with buttresses, two‑light bell‑stage openings, a clock, and a broach spire with gabled lucarnes and banding. The chancel comprises three bays and includes a seven‑light east window, while the west end contains a six‑light window.

=== Interior ===
Internally, the nave is carried on an arcade formed of double‑chamfered arches supported by quatrefoil piers with capitals and broaches, and it is covered by a hammerbeam roof. The chancel is entered through a tall, elaborately treated arch set on marble‑shafted supports, accompanied by a slender decorative iron screen introduced in 1888. Within the chancel are richly detailed sedilia and an Easter Sepulchre, together with arcades on both sides incorporating a barrel‑vaulted ceiling and detached shafts. The church contains a notable assemblage of stained glass: the east and west windows by Hardman & Co.; most aisle windows by Clayton & Bell; the west aisle terminations by William Wailes; and glass in the vestry by Jean-Baptiste Capronnier. The original choir stalls and benches survive, complemented by later 19th‑century fittings including a marble pulpit and a marble and alabaster reredos.

== See also ==
- Grade II* listed buildings in Greater Manchester
- Listed buildings in Heywood, Greater Manchester
