= Holy Family Roman Catholic and Church of England College =

Holy Family RC & CE College

Location
- Pot Hall; Wilton Grove; Heywood; Greater Manchester, OL10 2AA; England
- Coordinates: 53.58646°N 2.22253°W

Information
- Type: Voluntary aided school
- Religious affiliations: Roman Catholic / Church of England
- Local authority: Rochdale Council
- Department for Education URN: 131726 Tables
- Ofsted: Reports
- Headteacher: Karen Ames
- Gender: Coeducational
- Age: 11 to 16
- Enrolment: 750 as of December 2022
- Website: http://www.hfch.co.uk/

Holy Family RC & CE College (formerly St Joseph's RC High School) is a coeducational secondary school located in Heywood in the English county of Greater Manchester.

It is a voluntary aided school administered by Rochdale Metropolitan Borough Council, the Roman Catholic Diocese of Salford and the Church of England Diocese of Manchester. It was previously known as St Joseph's RC High School serving the Catholic population of the local area, however it became a joint-faith Catholic/Church of England school in 2007 and was renamed Holy Family RC & CE College.

Holy Family RC & CE College offers GCSEs and BTECs as programmes of study for pupils.
