= Listed buildings in Heywood, Greater Manchester =

Heywood is a town in the Metropolitan Borough of Rochdale, Greater Manchester, England, and it is unparished. The town and the surrounding countryside contain 18 listed buildings that are recorded in the National Heritage List for England. Of these, two are listed at Grade II*, the middle grade, and the others are at Grade II, the lowest grade. Until the coming of the Industrial Revolution the area was rural, and during the 19th century cotton mills were built. The earliest listed buildings are a house and a farmhouse with farm buildings. The later listed buildings include cotton mills and a chimney, churches and associated structures, a railway warehouse, a library, a house designed by Edgar Wood, and two war memorials.

== Key ==
Grade	Criteria
II*	Particularly important buildings of more than special interest
II	Buildings of national importance and special interest

== Buildings ==
Name and location	Photograph	Date	Notes	Grade
Old Birtle; 53.61595°N 2.25682°W	—	1671	A stone house on a plinth with quoins and a stone-slate roof with a coped gable. It has two storeys, two bays, and a rear outshut. The windows are mullioned, and there is a continuous hood mould above the ground floor. Inside the house is a dated bressumer.	II
Higher Elbut Farmhouse, stable and barn 53.60538°N 2.24942°W	—	Late 17th century	The building is in stone with a stone-slate roof. The farmhouse has two storeys and two bays, the one-bay stable is to the left, and the three-bay barn is to the right. The house has a doorway with square-cut jambs and lintel, and the windows are mullioned. The barn has opposed cart entries; the rear entry has been blocked.	II
Sundial; 53.59316°N 2.21859°W	—	1686	The sundial is in the churchyard of St Luke's Church. It is in stone, and consists of a chamfered square shaft on an eight-sided base, and has at the top a projecting panelled stage. The copper plate, without a gnomon, is on a moulded cornice.	II
Crimble Mill; 53.60131°N 2.20561°W		c. 1825	A cotton spinning mill that was enlarged in the 1860s and in 1886, it is in brick with stone dressings and a roof of slate and stone-slate. The main block has five storeys and 17 bays and a water tower at the north end. At the south end is an engine house and a four-storey, four-bay ancillary building. At the north end is a four-storey, five-bay warehouse.	II*
St Luke's Vicarage; 53.59367°N 2.21815°W	—	1826	The vicarage, later used for other purposes, is in brick with a slate roof. There is a double-depth plan, two storeys, and three bays. The central doorway has a moulded architrave, console brackets, a cornice, and an elliptical fanlight. The windows are sashes with stone sills.	II
Hooley Bridge Mills; 53.60137°N 2.22227°W		1830–40	A former cotton spinning and weaving mill that was extended in about 1900. It is in brick with internal cast iron framework and slate roofs. There are five storeys, a partial basement, 23 bays, and an integral engine house. The windows have round heads, there is a dentilled eaves cornice, and a projecting staircase and toilet tower with a pyramidal roof.	II
St James' Church; 53.59223°N 2.22585°W	—	1838	The chancel was added in 1861. The church is in stone with a slate roof, and consists of a nave on a plinth with an eaves cornice, a short chancel with north and south vestries, and a west tower. The tower has diagonal buttresses, three clock faces, and an embattled parapet with plain pinnacles in the corners and centres. The windows have pointed heads and Y-tracery, and inside the church are galleries on three sides.	II
Railway warehouse and loading shed 53.58917°N 2.20853°W	—	c. 1841–43	The warehouse and loading shed were built by the Manchester and Leeds Railway. The building is in sandstone and wood on a plinth, and has a slate roof with coped gables. The northwest gable end has three bays, a roundel in the gable, and windows and doorways. Along the sides are windows and other openings, and are partly covered in metal sheeting.	II
St John's Church, Birtle; 53.60685°N 2.25968°W		1845–46	A Commissioners' church by George Shaw in Early English style. It is in stone and has slate roofs with coped gables. The church consists of a nave, a south porch, a north transept, a chancel, and a north vestry. On the west gable is a bellcote, and the windows are lancets with a triple lancet at the east end.	II
St Luke's Church; 53.59334°N 2.21850°W		1860–62	The church, designed by Joseph Clarke, is in stone with slate roofs. It consists of a nave and a chancel with a clerestory, north and south aisles, a southwest porch, chapels and a vestry and a northwest steeple. The porch has a niche and a coped gables, and the steeple has a tower with four stages, angle buttresses, a clock face, and a broach spire with gabled lucarnes. The east window has seven lights, and the west window has six.	II*
Mutual Mills; 53.59648°N 2.21078°W		1884	A group of three cotton mills and a later weaving shed in brick, with dressings in stone and polychrome brick. The mill buildings have five and six storeys, with offices engine houses and boiler houses, but no chimneys remain. In the centre of the complex is a two-storey office and warehouse block. Features include corner towers, stair towers, and parapets with ball finials.	II
All Souls Church; 53.59548°N 2.20337°W		1898–99	The tower was added in 1908. The church is in stone with a slate roof, and consists of a nave with a clerestory, north and south aisles, a chancel with a polygonal apse, a north vestry with a pyramidal roof, and a north tower containing a porch. The tower has four stages, buttresses, and a parapet with blind traceried arcading.	II
Library; 53.59263°N 2.21810°W		1905–06	The library, built with a grant from Andrew Carnegie, has a front of ashlar stone, sides of brick and stone, and a Westmorland slate roof. The symmetrical front has one storey with an attic and three bays. The central doorway is flanked by paired Ionic half-columns, above which is an entablature, a semicircular hood flanked by reclining figures, and a gable with a six-light mullioned window. Over the door is a smaller semicircular hood with a triple keystone, and containing a cartouche. In the outer bays are canted bay windows with mullions and transoms.	II
Our Lady and St Joseph Church, Heywood; 53.59190°N 2.22050°W	—	1913–16	A Roman Catholic church by Henry Oswald Hill in Romanesque style, it is in buff and grey brick with dressings in red brick and roofs in Westmorland slate, and there were later extensions. The church consists of a short nave with a canted baptistry to the west, west porches, north and south transepts with side chapels, an organ loft in the north transept, a south vestry and an apsidal sanctuary. The windows and doorways are round-headed. The presbytery is to the south, it is linked to the vestry by a passage, and has two storeys and an attic.	II
Chimney, Crimble Mill; 53.60114°N 2.20529°W		Early 20th century	The chimney replaces an earlier one for the mill. It is in red-brown brick, and is circular and tapering. The chimney has yellow brick at the base, and the interior is lined with red brick. On the south side is a small metal door.	II
Bamford War Memorial; 53.60510°N 2.21794°W		1920	The war memorial stands near the entrance to St Michael's Church. It is in granite, and consists of a Latin cross on a pedestal and a two-stepped podium. On the cross is a central knot, at the base of the shaft is a laurel wreath, and carved on the shaft is a broadsword in relief. There is an inscription at the base of the shaft, and the names of those lost in both World Wars are on the pedestal and the podium.	II
Edgecroft; 53.58026°N 2.21361°W	—	1921	A house by Edgar Wood in brick with sandstone dressings and a stone-slate roof. It has two storeys, four bays, and a garage at the northeast. In the corner is a recessed porch with a semicircular opening. The gables are coped, with the coping extending to the front as a parapet. The windows on the front are casements with mullions and transoms, and there are canted bay windows on the right side and at the rear.	II
Heywood War Memorial; 53.59247°N 2.21876°W		1925	The war memorial is in granite and consists of a plain pylon flanked by tapering shafts, on a pedestal, itself on a plinth. Standing on the pedestal is a bronze female figure holding a palm. There is an inscription on the shaft, and the names of those lost and carved wreathes are on the pedestal.	II
