= Norden Cricket Club =

Norden Cricket Club
League	Lancashire League
Ground	Stag Park, Norden, Rochdale, Greater Manchester.
Lanc. & Chesh. history	1959 - 1980
CLL history	1981 - 2015
PL history	2016 - 2017
LL history	2018 -

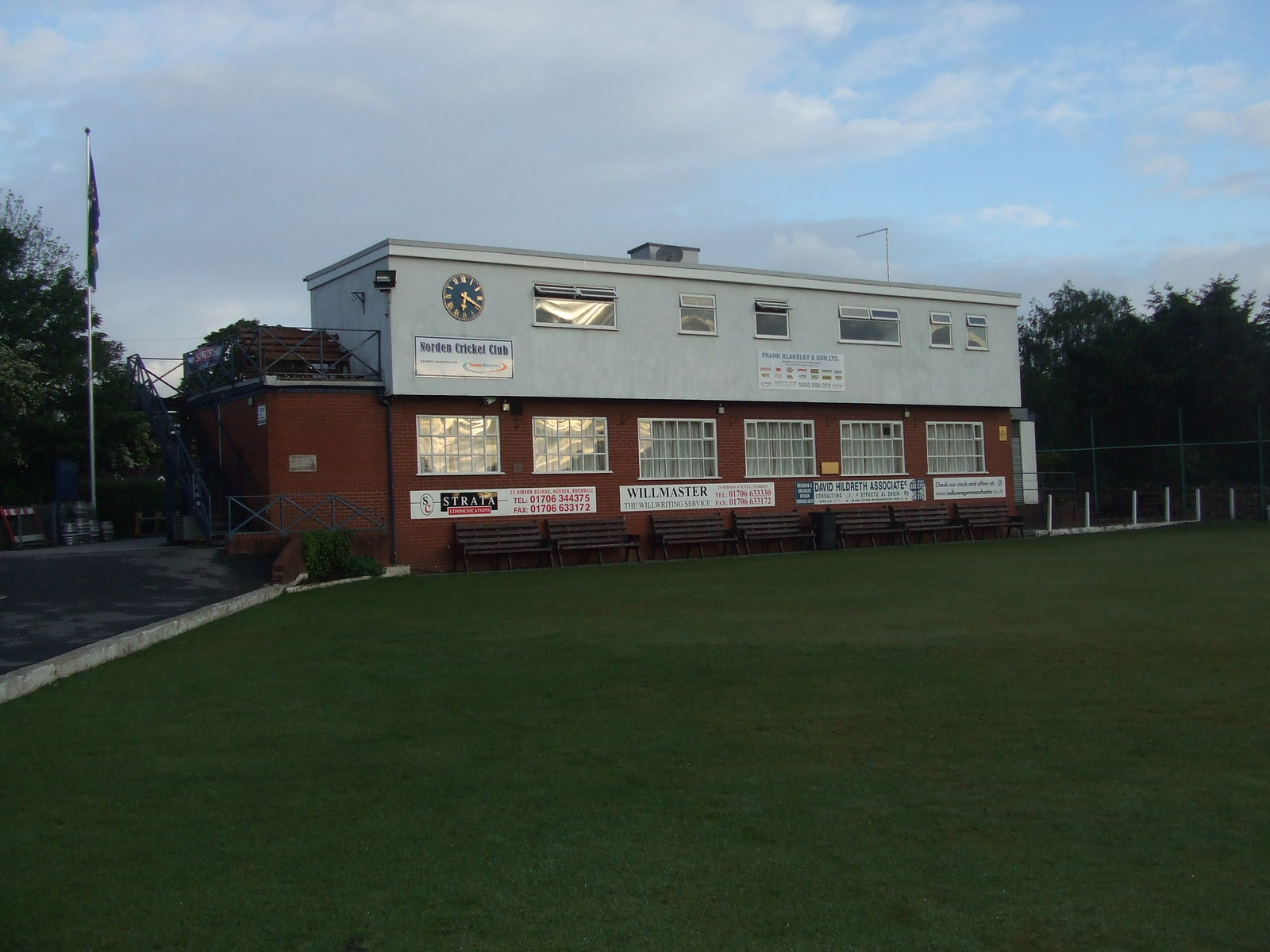
The club pavilion and playing field

Norden Cricket Club, known as Greenbooth Cricket Club until 1920, are an English cricket club.

They are currently branded Norden (J.W. Lees) CC as part of a sponsorship deal with a brewery and play their home fixtures at Stag Park, Norden, Rochdale, Greater Manchester.

They have an indirect link to Norden F.C., refounded in 2002 by a group of members of the cricket club.

== History ==
Greenbooth Cricket Club was formed in 1875 with no permanent home. By 1876 matches were played in a field near a local mill, whose owner was later the club's president. A small pavilion was built.

In 1881 the club moved temporarily to Pithouses in Norden village, but the following year matches were instead held at a new venue, Woodhouse Lane, where a square was laid at a cost of £18 - 6s - 8d. A wooden pavilion followed 4 years later. This ground is now known as Stag Park.

In 1888, the club employed its first professional player, George Hammond of Bury. The remainder of the team continued to be amateurs. In 1892 Greenbooth Cricket Club played its first competitive matches when it entered the Bury and District Cricket League. However, the club's participation in the league ended after one season.

In 1895 they joined the South East Lancashire League, and a new professional and coach was employed, a John Redfern from Linthwaite. His salary was £2-2s-0d (2 guineas) per week, which caused the players' annual subscription to be raised from three to four shillings. In 1896 the club transferred to the Middleton and District Cricket League, with John Redfern still employed as a professional player. However, in 1898 no professional was employed.

In 1899 the club won their first championship, the Middleton and District League, with a new professional fast bowler, G. E. Broadley from Accrington. The Middleton and District League was renamed as Lancashire Cricket Council in 1904.

Between 1900 and 1905 the club also operated a licensed bar, but despite improving the club's finances this venture caused some controversy, and the bar was closed in 1905.

In 1915 Greenbooth won the championship for a second time, and applied to join the Central Lancashire League. However, this application was unsuccessful, and the First World War had by now prevented any further play for several years.

In 1920 the club changed its name from Greenbooth Cricket Club to Norden Cricket and Recreation Club. Norden was admitted to the South Lancashire League in the following year. At the end of the season the club was £120 in debt.

In 1937 Norden became members of the Saddleworth League.

In 1945 Beswick Royds Estates, who owned the cricket ground, offered it to the club for £450. An appeal for funds from the public resulted in seven hundred pounds being raised and the ground was purchased.

In 1950, the club began to plan improvements to their ground and in 1951 raised £2,600 for a new pavilion. Plans for the pavilion were drawn by architect Jack Smith. The official opening ceremony was performed by former player Dr. Vernon Bell on Saturday 28 July, with a match between Norden and Fieldhouse. The pavilion was described in the souvenir programme:

There are dressing rooms at either end of the building: a hall or assembly room in the centre, secretary's room and a large kitchen. The pavilion covers an area of 176 sq. yds. exclusive of the terracing which covers a further 70 sq. yds. Volunteer labour was used to bring the building up to floor level and the following materials were used: Stone ballast 62 tons. Sand 28 tons. Cement 9 tons. Stone pitching and filling 70 tons. Granite chipping 8 tons. Bricks 10,000. Ashes 30 tons. drain pipes, gutters etc.

The first XI won their league in both 1952 and 1953, and also in 1953 the second XI finished runners-up in their division. In 1957 both teams were League Champions and the club won the Aggregate Cup.

In 1959 Norden joined the Lancashire and Cheshire League, and the second team won their championship in 1966.

After joining the Lancashire and Cheshire League, Norden fared poorly against more experienced sides, most of which were long standing social and cricket clubs. It was suggested that to improve the social aspect of the club a licensed bar, last run by the club in 1905, should again be considered. In 1966 an extraordinary general meeting was held to discuss the proposal for a new bar, with a lack of support for the idea. A further meeting reversed this decision, although the decision was not unanimous. The club raised the extra four hundred pounds required for the bar installation by 26 of the club's members agreeing to pay ten years' subscription in advance. Following the opening of the bar the club's finances were improved, and in the winter of 1973 the bar was extended and modified, using voluntary labour and gifts to prevent the club bearing the entire cost.

The club were Central Lancashire League Division One winners in 2004 and crowned champions again in 2010, as well as winning the Aggregate Trophy.

From start of the 2018 season Norden moved to the Lancashire League.

== List of professional players (incomplete) ==
- George Hammond of Bury, paid 5 shillings per game. 1888-?
- John Redfern of Linthwaite, paid £2-2s-0d per week. 1895–6 [7?]
- G. E. Broadley, a fast bowler, of Accrington. Pay unknown. 1899-?
- H. B. Watson. Pay unknown. 1921-?
- Fred Wilkinson. Pay unknown. 1923-?
