= Municipal Borough of Heywood =

Coordinates: 53°35′N 2°13′W

- Area
  - 1911: 3,658 acres (14.80 km^{2})
  - 1961: 8,508 acres (34.43 km^{2})
- Population
  - 1901: 24,458
  - 1971: 30,443
- History
  - Created: 1881
  - Abolished: 1974
  - Succeeded by: Metropolitan Borough of Rochdale
- Government
  - Motto: Alte Volo (I fly high)
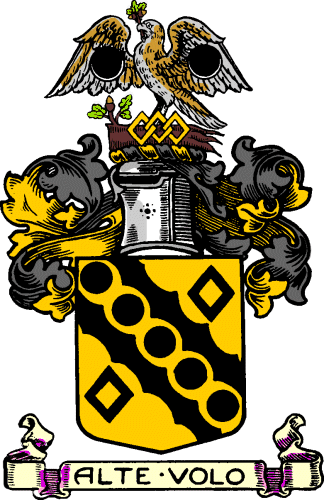

The Municipal Borough of Heywood was, from 1881 to 1974, a local government district in the administrative county of Lancashire, England, with borough status and coterminate with the town of Heywood.

== Civic history ==
The first local government in the area was formed in 1864, when part of the township of Heap adopted the Local Government Act 1858. Heap Middle Division Local Board was formed to govern the town. In 1867 the area of the local board was enlarged by the addition of parts of the townships of Birtle with Bamford, Castleton, Heap Hopwood, and Pilsworth. At the same time it was renamed as Heywood Local Board.

In 1880 the inhabitant householders of the area petitioned the privy council for the grant of a charter of incorporation under the Municipal Corporations Act. The request was successful and a charter was granted on 18 February 1881, constituting Heywood a municipal borough. A borough council consisting of a mayor, aldermen and councillors replaced the local board. Thomas Isherwood was elected first mayor of Heywood.

The borough boundaries were altered in 1900 and 1933. The municipal borough was abolished by the Local Government Act 1972, with its area included in the Metropolitan Borough of Rochdale, one of ten districts in the new county of Greater Manchester.

== Coat of arms ==
The Mayor Aldermen and Burgesses of Heywood were granted armorial bearings by the College of Arms on 14 May 1881. The blazon was as follows:
Or five pellets between two bendlets engrailed the whole between as many mascles sable; and for a crest on a wreath of the colours in front of the trunk of a tree eradicated fessewise and sprouting to the dexter a falcon rising proper each wing charged with a pellet and holding in the beak a sprig of oak also proper three mascles interlaced Or.

The arms were based on those of the Heywood family: Argent, three roundels between two bendlets all gules, Crest: a falcon rising from a tree trunk proper. In the arms of the borough, the colouring was changed form silver and red to gold and black. The heralds also introduced mascles or hollow diamond shaped figures. It has been suggested that these were intended to represent the coal and iron industries. The Latin motto of the Heywood family Alte Volo or "I fly high" was also adopted.

== Borough council ==
The borough council was initially composed of a mayor, eighteen councillors and six aldermen. The borough was divided into three wards, with six councillors and two aldermen returned for each ward. The first town council was controlled by the Liberal Party, with Conservatives forming an opposition group. Although there were annual elections of one third of the councillors, these were uncontested in many years. In 1892 the first Labour members joined the council, when three aldermen were returned unopposed.

Heywood Corporation Act 1909
- Act of Parliament
- Parliament of the United Kingdom
- Long title: An Act to make further and better provision with regard to the tramway gas and electricity undertakings of the corporation of Heywood and the improvement health and local government of the borough and for other purposes.
- Citation: 9 Edw. 7. c. cxxxi

Dates
- Royal assent: 16 August 1909

Text of statute as originally enacted

From 1905 borough elections were contested. The Liberals retained their majority, with the Conservative and Labour parties also represented in the council. A local act of Parliament promoted by Heywood Corporation in 1908, the Heywood Corporation Act 1909 (9 Edw. 7. c. cxxxi), increased the number of wards, councillors and aldermen. The size of the council was increased to thirty-six, consisting of twenty-four councillors and eight aldermen.

No party held a majority on the council for many years. By 1949 the composition was sixteen Conservatives, thirteen Liberals, six Labour and one Independent. The three main parties were to have approximate parity on the council until 1958, when Labour gained control. The Conservatives and Liberals formed an anti-Labour alliance which took control at the 1959 election. The council then alternated between Labour (1963–1965), Conservative/Liberal (1965–1967) and Conservative (1968–1970) administrations. For the last four years of the council's existence, no party had a majority, with Labour the largest party from 1972.
