= Heywood railway station =

Heritage railway station in Greater Manchester, England

Heywood
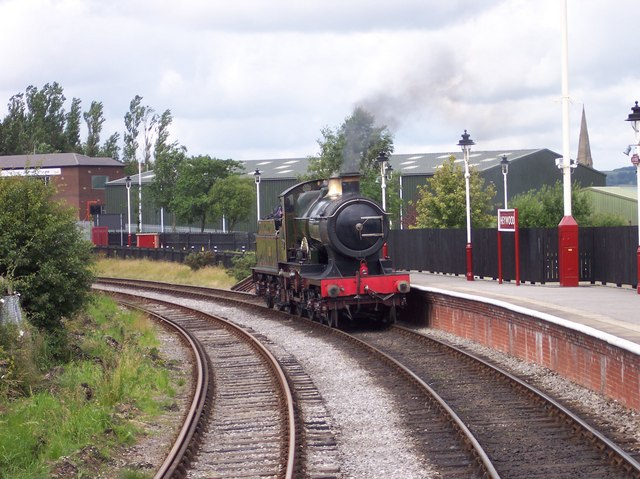

General information
- Location: Heywood, Greater Manchester; England
- Coordinates: 53.5889°N 2.2069°W
- Grid reference: SD863102
- System: Station on heritage railway
- Manager: East Lancashire Railway
- Platforms: 1

Key dates
- 1841: Original station opened
- 1848: Resited
- 5 October 1970: Closed
- 6 September 2003: Current station opened
Location

Heywood railway station serves the town of Heywood, in Greater Manchester, England. Formerly a stop on the national railway network, it is now the southern terminus of heritage East Lancashire Railway services.

== History ==
The original station was opened in 1841 by the Manchester and Leeds Railway. It was resited in 1848 when the line was extended to Bury. The station closed on 5 October 1970.

It was reopened on 6 September 2003 as an extension of the heritage East Lancashire Railway (ELR) from Bury Bolton Street. The boundary between the ELR and the national rail network is located a short distance east of the station, at Hopwood.

A pledge of £300 million was made to link Heywood back to the National Rail network in 2009, which would have seen direct services to Manchester Victoria, via Castleton; however, this scheme was subsequently shelved due to lack of funding. The ELR still has ambitions to run trains through to Castleton though to allow direct interchange with National Rail services there. This would form part of a larger scheme to regenerate the area and create additional tourist attractions such as a proposed Heywood Culture Park.

The original station was situated immediately opposite the terminal wharf of the Heywood Branch Canal. The ELR station is situated slightly further to the east, nearer to the former Heywood railway wagon works.

== Services ==
The East Lancashire Railway operates every weekend throughout the year, with additional services on some Wednesdays, Thursdays and Fridays between Easter and the end of September.

Preceding station	Heritage railways	Following station
Bury Bolton Street towards Rawtenstall	East Lancashire Railway	Terminus
Planned extension
Bury Bolton Street Line and station open towards Rawtenstall	East Lancashire Railway	Castleton Line closed, station open Terminus
Disused railways
Broadfield; Line open, station closed	Lancashire and Yorkshire Railway; Manchester and Leeds Railway	Castleton; Line closed, station open
Broadfield; Line open, station closed	Lancashire and Yorkshire Railway; Manchester and Leeds Railway	Middleton Junction; Line and station closed
