= Castleton, Greater Manchester =

Area of Rochdale, Greater Manchester, England

Coordinates: 53.5907°N 2.1737°W

Castleton
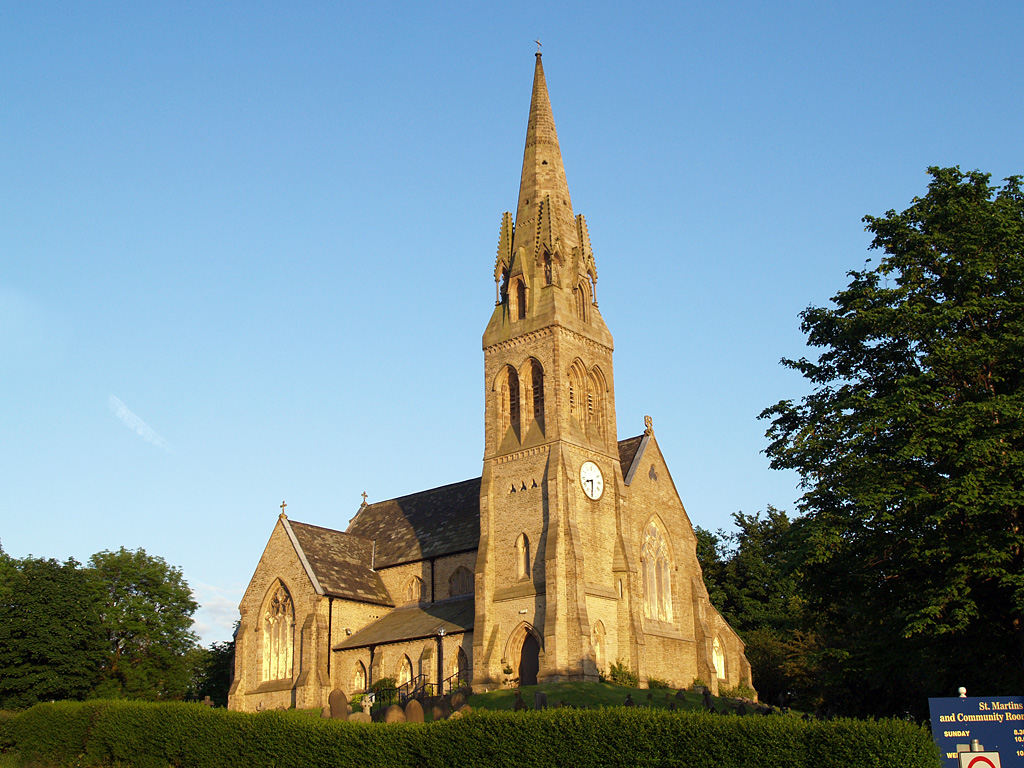
- St Martin's has dominated Castleton's skyline since 1863

- Location within Greater Manchester
- Population: 10,159 (2011 Census)
- OS grid reference: SD8810
  - London: 168 mi (270 km) SSE
- Metropolitan borough: Rochdale
- Metropolitan county: Greater Manchester
- Region: North West
- Country: England
- Sovereign state: United Kingdom
- Post town: ROCHDALE
- Postcode district: OL11
- Dialling code: 01706
- Police: Greater Manchester
- Fire: Greater Manchester
- Ambulance: North West
- UK Parliament: Heywood and Middleton

Castleton is an area of Rochdale, Greater Manchester, England, 1.2 miles (1.9 km) south-southwest of Rochdale town centre and 8 miles (13 km) north-northeast of the city of Manchester.

Historically a part of Lancashire, Castleton's early history is marked by its status as a township within the ancient parish of Rochdale. Prior to merging with the County Borough of Rochdale in 1900, Castleton experienced rapid growth during the 19th century as a mill town in its own right, facilitated for the most part by the construction of the Rochdale Canal which is routed through the area. Castleton's growth was significant; so much so, that for a time it was almost the same size of nearby Rochdale.

Located between junctions 19 and 20 of the M62 motorway, Castleton today is a predominantly residential area, with a total population of 9,715, increasing to 10,159 at the 2011 Census.

== History ==
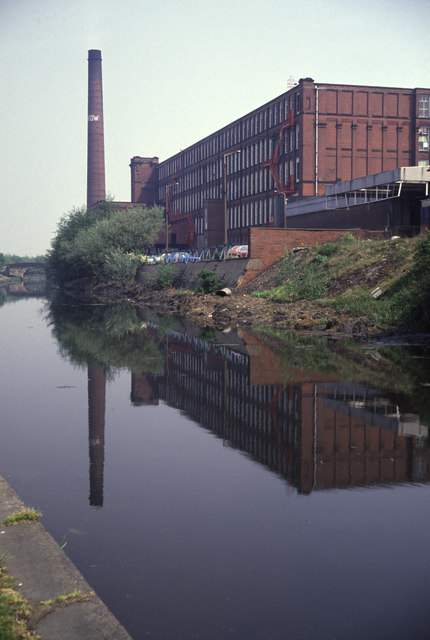
Arrow Mill is a former cotton mill and Grade II listed building in Castleton

The most ancient known reference to Castleton is found in the Domesday Book (1086). The name suggests a link with a fortification; the Castleton area was the site of Rochdale Castle. The castle is believed to have been located on the south bank of the River Roch, which runs through Castleton.

During the 13th century, Castleton was known as Castletown, or Castle Town. Approximately 60 acres of land (four bovates) were endowed to Stanlaw Abbey in the late years of Roger de Lacy (1170–1211) for the benefit of its Cistercian monastic community.

Back around the time the canal was built, Castleton was known as Blue Pits Village, because of the blue clay that was found and mined around the area that the railway is now. This information is on a tourist sign on the entrance to the canal off the Manchester bound side of Manchester Road.

The Rochdale Canal was routed through Castleton around the year 1800 and made Castleton one of the larger industrial areas in North West England. The canal granted jobs for hundreds of local residents, as it enabled the construction of several cotton mills. With the mills came the need for engineering and from 1892, Castleton was the home of Tweedales and Smalley who manufactured looms and textile machinery. Their 14 acres (5.7 ha) Globe Works factory no longer exists, being part of the Woolworths site.

The Manchester and Leeds Railway Company (later the Lancashire and Yorkshire Railway) arrived in Castleton in 1839, and it was here that the line formerly diverged to Bury, Ramsbottom, Rawtenstall, Bacup and finally rejoined the main line at Rochdale. Castleton's railway area was one of the last mainstays of steam, being a huge resource of freight.

Castleton Hall was a country house belonging to the Holtes; it was built in the Elizabethan period and enlarged in 1719. It was occupied in the late nineteenth century by the "Joyful News Training Home and Mission", now Cliff College, which moved from Castleton to its current location at Calver in Derbyshire under the direction of the Wesleyan Methodist Church in 1904.

In 1903, Whipp & Bourne Ltd. was founded by Samuel Whipp and Charles Bourne to manufacture electrical switchgear. The company closed its factory in Castleton, in 2007.

In 1913, the Dunlop Rubber company began building a vast textile mill complex at Castleton. At its peak the mill employed over 3,000 workers. Most of the mill was demolished in 1979. Dunlop Textiles ceased trading in 2005.

== Governance ==
Lying within the historic county boundaries of Lancashire from a very early time, Castleton constituted a township within the ancient parish of Rochdale, in Salford hundred. During this time, Castleton stretched beyond what is now recognised as its boundaries, including with it the localities of Balderstone, Captain Fold, Hartly, Marland and Newburn.

In 1865, part of Castleton was transferred to the newly created Municipal Borough of Rochdale, in 1866 Castleton became a separate civil parish, in 1894 the parish was abolished to form Castleton by Rochdale, part also went to Rochdale, Heywood and Milnrow. In 1891 the parish had a population of 38,509. Following local government reorganisation in 1894, Castleton, though lying wholly within the administrative county of Lancashire, remained divided on this basis, forming two local government districts; "County Borough of Rochdale" and "Castleton-by-Rochdale". Castleton-by-Rochdale was renamed to "Castleton Urban District" in 1896, and four years later in 1900, was abolished (as part of a mutual agreement between local councillors) split and transferred to the neighbouring Rochdale and Heywood local government districts.

As part of the provisions of the Local Government Act 1972, the former county boroughs and urban districts were abolished, and Castleton was given to the newly formed Metropolitan Borough of Rochdale within the metropolitan county of Greater Manchester.

== Economy ==
Castleton was home to a large Woolworths warehouse and office block, based on Royle Barn Road. The site is now closed following the failure of the Woolworths group. This mill is close to Arrow Mill, which is almost adjacent on Queensway. Royle Barn Road links Castleton with Sudden, emerging near the Tesco supermarket.

Castleton is without any banks as they were all closed in the late 1980s/early 1990s. Carcraft was based there, on the former site of Asda but has now closed down.

== Landmarks ==
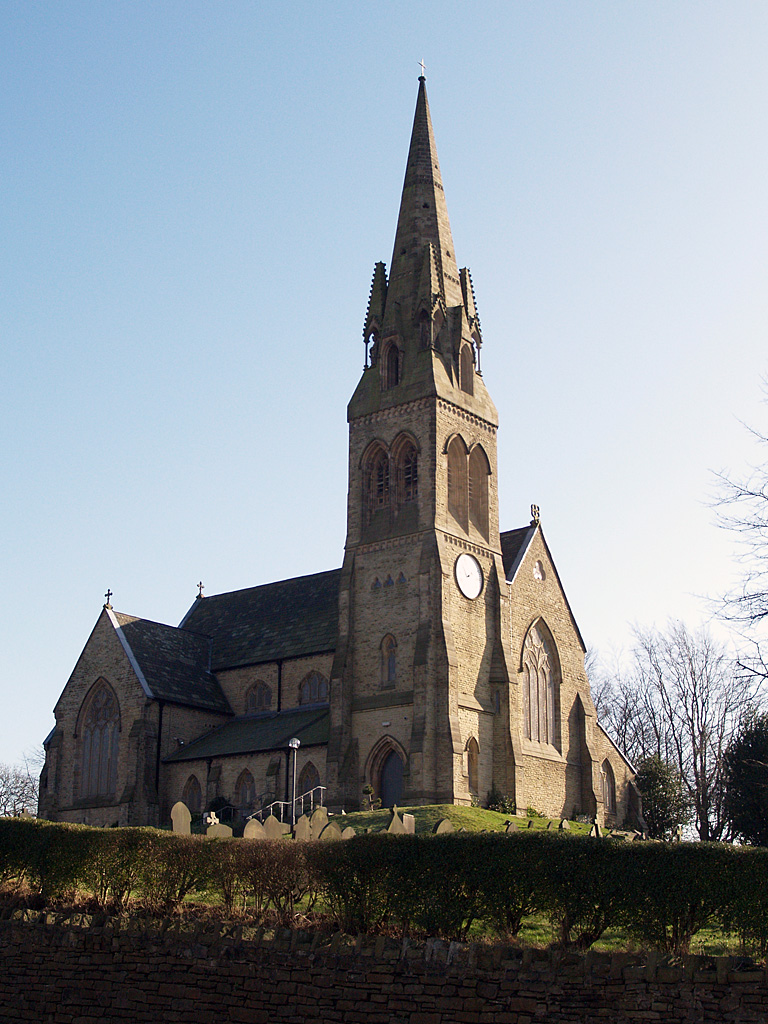
The Church of St Martin's at Castleton, was completed in 1863.

Castleton is home to St. Martin's C of E church. This example of religious Victorian architecture still stands tall to this very day. It was completed in 1863 and closed in 1991. It was refurbished in 2002/2003.

Castleton's main apparent architecture is that of the old Victorian style terraces, however there are some renovated areas.

== Transport ==
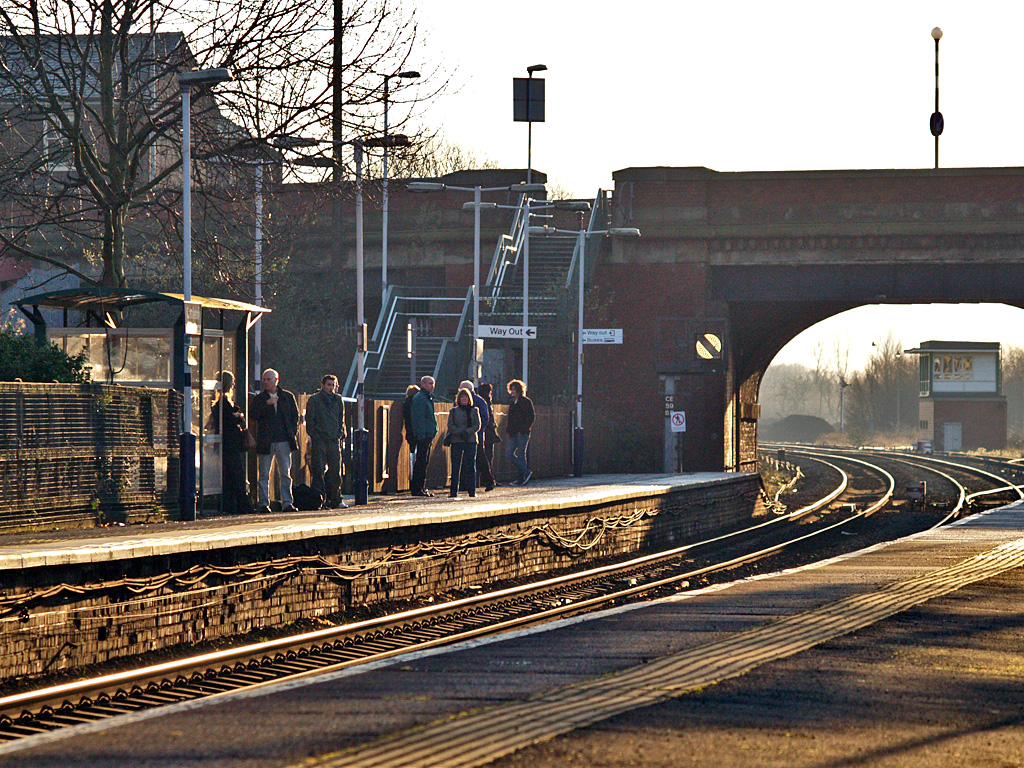
Castleton railway station lies on the Caldervale line.

Castleton railway station serves the local community at Castleton, and lies on the Caldervale Line (which connects Castleton to Manchester and Leeds).

Until March 2007, Castleton was home to a Corus steel works. It was built on the site of the former British Railways Castleton Central Materials Depot. In 1954 the Marshalling Ward consisted of four sidings between Castleton East Junction and Castleton North Junction. There was however a further seven sidings on the Down side and nine sidings on the Up side for wagon storage.

Castleton was originally the junction for the branch line to Heywood, which was then extended through Bury to Bolton. A connecting line (known as the Bury South Junction Connecting Line or Bury East Fork) enabled trains off the Castleton to Bolton line to run northwards from Bury on the Clifton Junction to Accrington line. The Bacup line left the Clifton Junction to Accrington line at Stubbins Junction. Therefore, the remaining Castleton to Rawtenstall line is combination of remnants of several lines.

The Rochdale Canal runs through Castleton, adjacent to the railway on one side, and Queensway on the other. The road passes over the canal via an old brick bridge, which was refurbished along with the canal. Castleton is also home to two of the canal's locks, as it goes on a down gradient through Slattocks and on its way into Manchester city centre.

== Sports ==
Castleton has its own rugby league and football clubs. Rochdale Mayfield A.L.R.F.C. (formerly "Mayfield") play rugby league at Castleton Sports Centre. Rochdale Town F.C. (formerly Castleton Gabriels) were also based at the same ground. They played in the North West Counties Football League First Division.

== Education ==
Castleton has three primary schools: Castleton County Primary School, St. Edward's Primary School and St. Gabriel's RC Primary School. Castleton Primary School is by far the most memorable by Castleton's older residents, as it was built in 1902 and opened to the public as 'Castleton Board School' in 1903. The school's external secondary assembly hall/sporting equipment annex was demolished in 2003 to make way for a better building.
