= Heywood, Greater Manchester =

Town in Greater Manchester, England

Coordinates: 53.590°N 2.219°W

Heywood
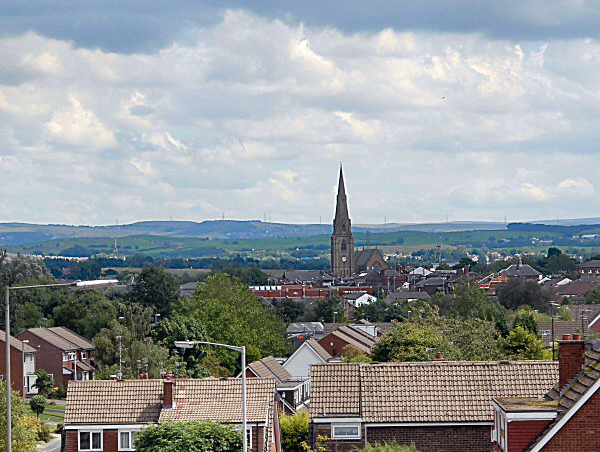
- A view of Heywood, towards St Luke's Church

- Location within Greater Manchester
- Area: 7 sq mi (18 km^{2})
- Population: 28,205 (2011)
  - Density: 4,029/sq mi (1,556/km^{2})
- OS grid reference: SD855104
  - London: 169 mi (272 km)SSE
- Metropolitan borough: Rochdale
- Metropolitan county: Greater Manchester
- Region: North West
- Country: England
- Sovereign state: United Kingdom
- Post town: HEYWOOD
- Postcode district: OL10
- Dialling code: 01706
- Police: Greater Manchester
- Fire: Greater Manchester
- Ambulance: North West
- UK Parliament: Heywood and Middleton

Heywood is a town in the Metropolitan Borough of Rochdale, Greater Manchester, England, on the south bank of the River Roch, 2 miles (3.2 km) east of Bury, 4 miles (6.4 km) southwest of Rochdale, and 8 miles (12.9 km) north of Manchester. Middleton lies to the south, whilst to the north is the Cheesden Valley, open moorland, and the Pennines.

The Anglo-Saxons cleared the densely wooded area, dividing it into heys or fenced clearings. In the Middle Ages, Heywood formed a chapelry in the township, around Heywood Hall, a manor house owned by a family with that surname. Farming was the main industry of a sparsely populated rural area. The population supplemented their incomes by hand-loom woollen weaving in the domestic system.

The factory system in the town can be traced to a spinning mill in the late 18th century. Following the introduction of textile manufacture during the Industrial Revolution, Heywood developed into a mill town and coal mining district. A period of "extraordinary growth of the cotton-trade" in the mid 19th century was so quick and profound that there was "an influx of strangers causing a very dense population". The town became a municipal borough in 1881. Imports of foreign cotton goods in the mid-20th century precipitated the decline of Heywood's textile and mining industries, resulting in a more diverse industrial base. The town was well respected for the quality of its cotton goods. The Queen Mother once visited Heywood in the very early 1900s to admire the cotton in its factories. Cotton from Heywood cotton mills was used to create the dress that she wore for her 50th birthday celebration speech.

Heywood is close to junction 19 of the M62 motorway, which provides transport links for the large distribution parks in the south of the town. The 1860s-built 188-foot (57 m) tall Parish Church of St Luke the Evangelist dominates the town centre and skyline. Heywood was the birthplace of Peter Heywood, the magistrate who aided the discovery of the Gunpowder Plot, whose family seat was Heywood Hall. Heywood has a station on the East Lancashire heritage railway.

== History ==
Evidence attests that human activity in the area extends back to the Mesolithic period; flints have been found in Heywood, in the Cheesden Valley and Knowl Moor areas. Artefacts from the Roman period and Bronze Age have been discovered. A Bronze Age cairn 2 feet (1 m) high and 11 yards (10 m) in diameter was discovered in the 1960s. Excavations by the Bury Archaeological Group revealed beakers associated with human burials. The name Heywood is believed to derive from the Old English word "haga", meaning hedge or animal-enclosure. In the 12th century, Heywood was recorded as a hamlet in the township of Heap.

A family surnamed Heywood can be traced back to the 11th century, and in 1286, Adam de Bury granted the land of Heywood to Peter of Heywood. Heywood Hall, the administrative centre of the manor and the seat of the Heywood family, was built in the 13th century. A member of the family and a resident of Heywood Hall was Peter Heywood, the magistrate who, with a party of men, arrested Guy Fawkes during the Gunpowder Plot of 1605. Another member of the family, also called Peter Heywood, was aboard HMS Bounty when its crew mutinied in 1789.

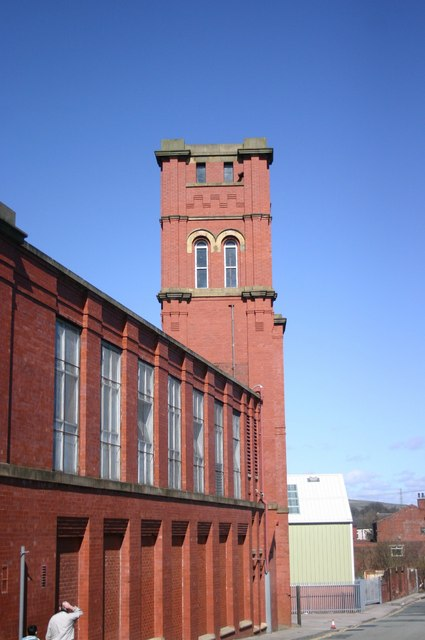
The mill known locally as The Mop Shop. Industrial textile manufacturing was introduced to Heywood in the late 18th century and by 1833, the town had 27 cotton mills

During the Middle Ages the area was thinly populated and consisted of several hamlets. Apart from the Heywoods of Heywood Hall, the sparse population of Heywood comprised a small community of farmers, most of whom were involved with pasture but supplemented their incomes by weaving woollens and fustians in the domestic system. During the Early Modern period, the weavers of Heywood had been using spinning wheels in makeshift weavers' cottages, but as the demand for cotton goods increased and the technology of cotton-spinning machinery improved during the early 18th century, the need for larger structures to house bigger and more efficient equipment became apparent. Industrial textile manufacture was introduced in the town in the late 18th century and the first spinning mill – Makin Mill – was built at Wrigley Brook (later known as Queens Park Road). By 1780 there remained less than 100 hand-loom fustian weavers out of a population of 2,000 and industrialist Sir Robert Peel (father of Prime Minister Robert Peel) converted Makin Mill for cotton production. This initiated a process of urbanisation and socioeconomic transformation in the area and the population moved away from farming, adopting employment in the factory system. The cotton trade in Heywood grew, and by 1833 there were 27 cotton mills.

What was described as a period of "extraordinary growth of the cotton-trade" in the mid-19th century, led to "an influx of strangers causing a very dense population". Urbanisation caused by the expansion of factories and housing meant that in 1885, Rochdale-born poet Edwin Waugh, was able to describe Heywood as "almost entirely the creation of the cotton industry".

In 1905 Plum Tickle Mill began operation as the largest mule-spinning mill in the world under one roof, however, Plum Mill and its sister-mill, Unity Mill, were idled in the 1960s under the government reorganisation of the cotton industry. The last large weaving mill in the town was J. Smith, Hargreaves & Company, towel manufacturers. However this mill was also idled in the 1980s and operations were transferred to W.T. Taylor & Company in Horwich.

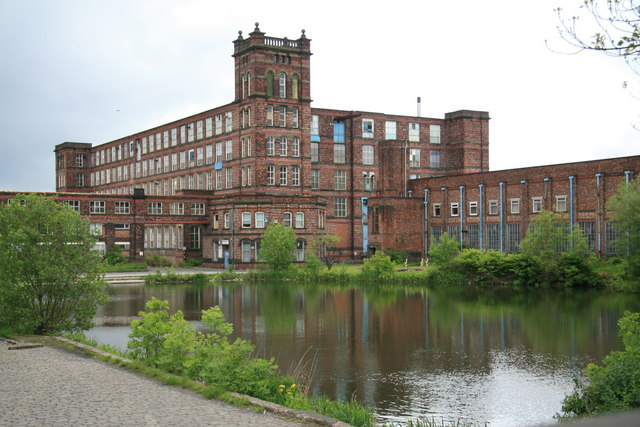
Following the Industrial Revolution, Heywood became a mill town, its landscape dominated by large brick-built cotton mills. This one is part of the Grade II listed Mutual Mills complex.

Most of the cotton mills have now been demolished, mainly to make way for housing. One of the last mills remaining, though not in production since 1986, has recently been offered for redevelopment as flats. The "Mutual Mills", a complex of four, are Grade II listed buildings.

The town also has a history of coal mining. Coal pits were opened in Hooley Clough in the early 19th century by the Lord of the Manor of Rochdale. During the 19th century a colliery at Captain Fold was run by the Heywood Coal Company. Two people were killed at Captain Fold Colliery between 1844 and 1848. When the mine flooded in 1852 two more people were killed and the colliery closed soon after. Mining continued in the town with drift mining in Bamford until 1950.

In 1881, the newly created Municipal Borough of Heywood included 67 cotton mills and weaving sheds, 67 machine works and other workshops, 75 cotton waste and other warehouses and 5,877 dwelling houses. It had 22 churches and chapels and 24 Sunday and day schools. The population was estimated at 25,000.

The town was originally served by railway, with Heywood railway station to the south of the town. There were services to Bury Knowsley Street railway station and Rochdale, but this line was closed in the 1970s. However, the line has recently been re-opened to Bury, as an extension to the East Lancashire Railway preservation project.

The town had its own canal, the Heywood Branch Canal which is now infilled and largely gone.

There is a local legend that men from Heywood used to have tails and that public houses had holes in their benches for tails to fit through. The legend led to the town developing the nickname of "Monkey Town". A more prosaic explanation is that in the 19th Century, the town was based around Heap Bridge, now barely a suburb of the town, when, in the accent (of the locals) and Irish "Navvies" working on the railway, the town was 'Ape bridge.

In the 20th century, the town's cotton mills went into steep decline, only Glossop in Derbyshire went into sharper recession; in contrast, the spinning capacity of nearby Rochdale shrank more slowly than any other mill town apart from Wigan.

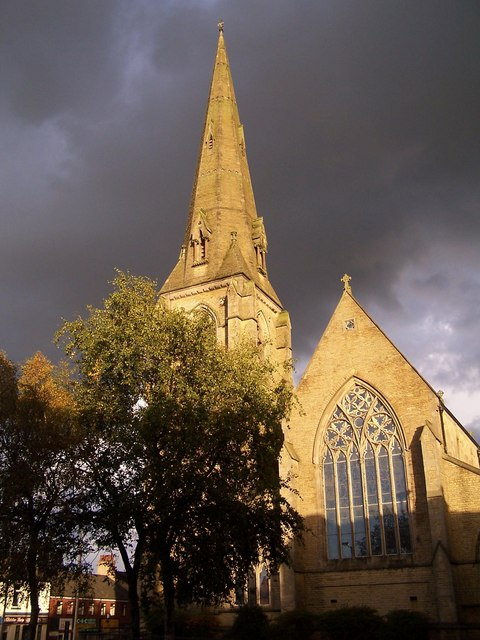
St Luke's Church is noted in the area for its beautiful proportions and ornate carvings.

In 2007 plans were announced to shake off an area's 'mill town' image and rejuvenate the town over a 10–15-year period to appeal to a younger generation. The plan involves creating new retail, business and community spaces, demolishing 300 flats and houses and replacing them with 1,000 new homes.

Heywood Golf Club (now defunct) was founded in 1905. The club disappeared at the time of World War Two.

== Governance ==
=== Civic history ===
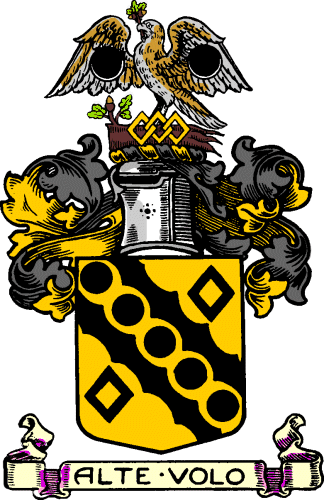
The coat of arms of the former Heywood Municipal Borough Council. This coat of arms was granted by the College of Arms on 14 May 1881.

Lying within the historic county boundaries of Lancashire since the early 12th century, Heywood during the Middle Ages constituted a chapelry in the township of Heap, parish of Bury, and hundred of Salford. The Heywood family, who had their seat at Heywood Hall, exercised considerable political power throughout the Middle Ages on the locale.

Following the Poor Law Amendment Act 1834, Heywood formed part of the Bury Poor Law Union, an inter-parish unit established to provide social security. Heywood's first local authority was a Local board of health established in 1864; Heap Middle Division Local Board of Health was a regulatory body responsible for standards of hygiene and sanitation for the Heywood part of Heap township. In 1867 the local board was reconstituted as the Heywood Local Board of Health which covered the whole of Heap township and parts of Hopwood, Birtle-with-Bamford, Pilsworth and Castleton townships. In 1879 further parts of Hopwood and Pilsworth townships were added to the area under the local board. It was not recognised as a borough in the Municipal Corporations Act 1835, but on 18 February 1881 the area of the local board was granted borough status and became the Municipal Borough of Heywood. Following the Local Government Act 1894 (which formally dissolved all townships) the municipal borough became a local government district of the administrative county of Lancashire. The borough council was based out of Heywood's Municipal Buildings. In 1900 a part of Castleton Urban District was added to Heywood, and in 1933 part of the Heywood borough was transferred to the County Borough of Bury, whilst in exchange, parts of Norden Urban District and Birtle-with-Bamford and Unsworth civil parishes were added to Heywood. In 1967, the Borough of Heywood twinned with Peine in Germany.

Under the Local Government Act 1972, the Municipal Borough of Heywood was abolished, and Heywood has, since 1 April 1974, formed an unparished area of the Metropolitan Borough of Rochdale, a local government district of the metropolitan county of Greater Manchester. Municipal Buildings, which served as the former town hall, were demolished in the mid-1980s. Since 1992, Heywood has been one of four township committee areas of the Metropolitan Borough of Rochdale. The Heywood Township Committee meets six times per year, with the vision of making Heywood "a safe, small town set in attractive countryside ... part of a successful borough and city region". Each meeting commences with an open forum session, which gives local residents the opportunity to ask questions of their local members or to raise issues of local concern.

=== Parliamentary representation ===
In terms of parliamentary representation, Heywood after the Reform Act 1832 was represented as part of the South Lancashire constituency, of which the first Members of Parliaments (MPs) were the Liberals George William Wood and Charles Molyneux. Constituency boundaries changed throughout the 19th and 20th centuries, and Heywood has lain within the South East Lancashire (1868–1885), Heywood (1885–1918), Heywood and Radcliffe (1918–1950), and Heywood and Royton (1950–1983) constituencies. Between 1983 and 2024, Heywood lied within Heywood and Middleton. It was represented in the House of Commons by Liz McInnes, a member of the Labour Party from 2014 to 2019. At the 2019 general election, McInnes was defeated by Conservative candidate, Chris Clarkson. Since 2024, Heywood has lied in the Heywood and Middleton North constituency represented by Elsie Blundell of the Labour Party.

== Geography ==
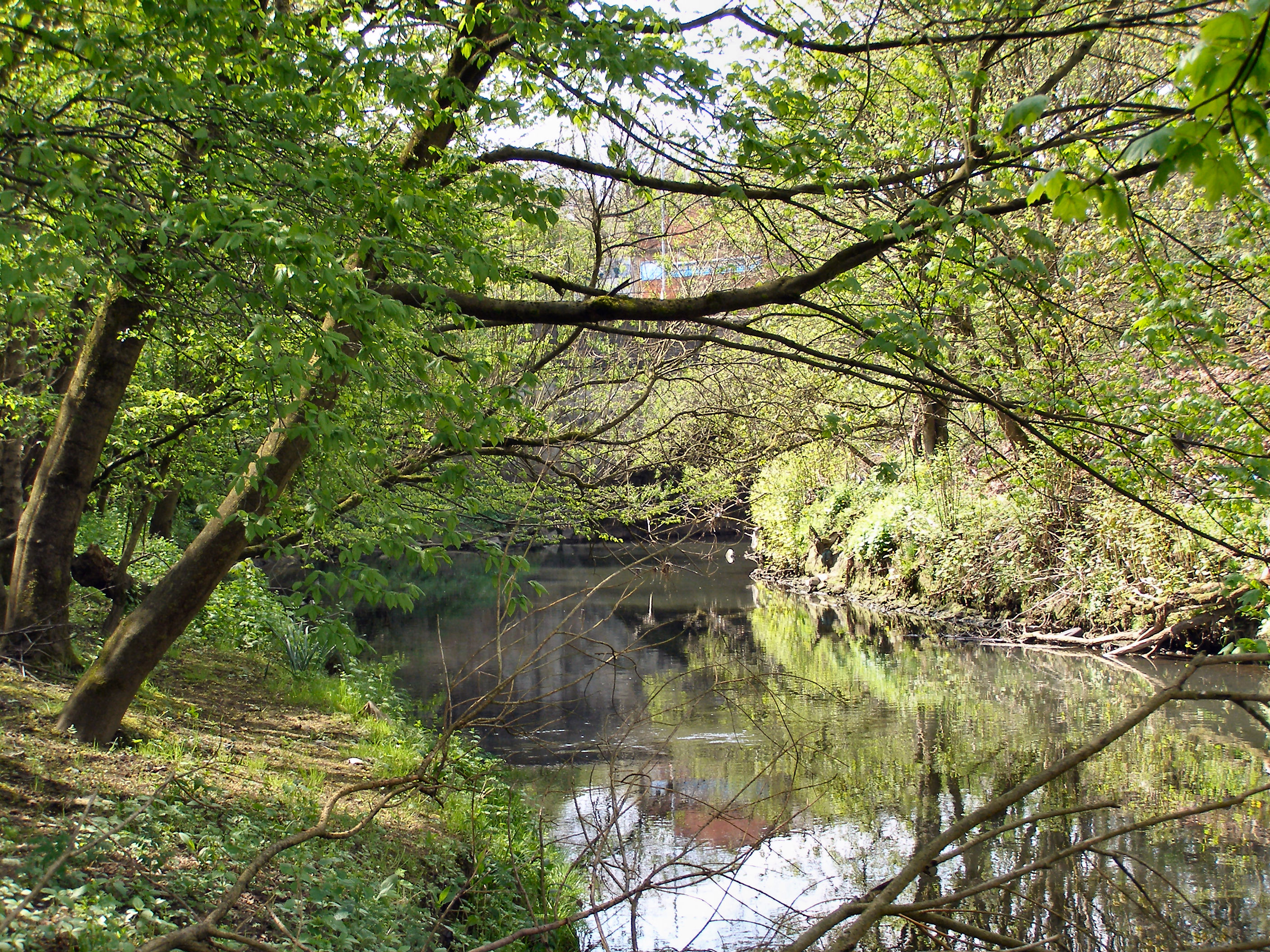
The River Roch rises on Chelburn Moor, south of Todmorden, and flows to the north of Heywood before joining the River Irwell at Radcliffe.

Located 169 miles (272 km) north-northwest of central London, Heywood lies south of the Pennines, on the south bank of the River Roch. The larger towns of Bury, Middleton and Rochdale lie to the west, south and northeast respectively. For purposes of the Office for National Statistics, Heywood forms part of the Greater Manchester Urban Area, with Manchester city centre itself 7.4 miles (11.9 km) south of Heywood.

At the north of Heywood, the River Roch meanders westerly into Bury, and then onwards to Radcliffe where it unites its waters with the River Irwell. The general slope of the land in Heywood increases in height away from the Roch. From the north bank of the Roch is the Roch Valley and Cheesden Valley. The Cheesden Valley is a wooded river valley of the Cheesden Brook, flanked on all sides by high moorland and small hamlets, like Birtle. The soil is sandy, and the subsoil is clay.

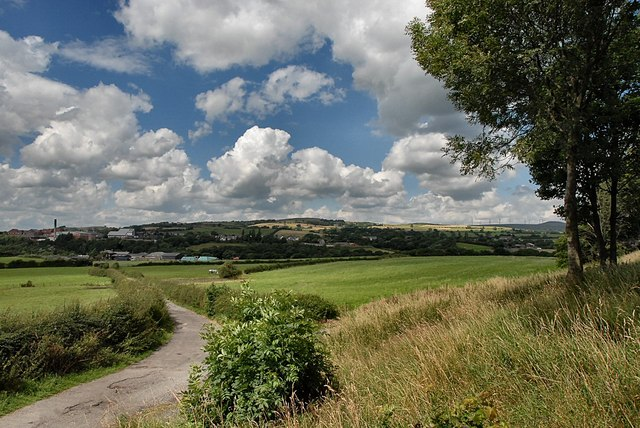
Ashworth Moor lies to the north of Heywood. It forms part of the green belt that surrounds the town.

Heywood's built environment follows a standard urban structure, consisting of residential dwellings centred around Market Street in the town centre, which is the local centre of commerce. There is a mixture of low-density urban areas, suburbs, semi-rural and rural locations in Heywood, but overwhelmingly the land use in the town is residential. Heywood is surrounded on all sides by Green Belt, variously consisting of wooded river valleys and high moorland in the north, and flat farmland in the south.

Suburban localities in Heywood include Broadfield, Captain Fold, Crimble, Darnhill and Hopwood. Hopwood was formerly a township of itself, but was amalgamated into Heywood in the 19th century. Darnhill is the site of a planned overspill council estate, built in the 1950s and 1960s as part of a slum clearance project throughout inner-city Manchester. Heywood's population increased when thousands of people were moved out of Manchester's slums and into what was then the Heywood countryside of Darnhill.

== Demography ==
Heywood Compared
2011 UK Census	Heywood	Rochdale (borough)	England
Total population	28,205	211,699	53,012,456
White	95.6%	81.7%	85.4%
Asian	2.0%	14.9%	7.8%
Black	1.0%	1.3%	3.5%

According to the Office for National Statistics, at the time of the United Kingdom Census 2001, Heywood had a population of 28,024. The 2001 population density was 11,338 per mi^{2} (4,378 per km^{2}), with a 100 to 94.3 female-to-male ratio. Of those over 16 years old, 30.3% were single (never married) and 39.7% married. Heywood's 11,724 households included 31.2% one-person, 34.6% married couples living together, 10.5% were co-habiting couples, and 12.6% single parents with their children. Of those aged 16–74, 38.3% had no academic qualifications.

At the 2001 UK census, 80.6% of Heywood's residents reported themselves as being Christian, 1.1% Muslim, 0.1% Hindu, 0.1% Buddhist and 0.1% Jewish. The census recorded 9.9% as having no religion, 0.1% had an alternative religion and 8.0% did not state their religion.

Heywood's population remained constant for most of the 20th century, but increased from 24,090 in 1960 to 30,443 in 1970, following the opening of the Darnhill overspill council estate, which transferred thousands of people from inner-city Manchester, to Heywood. The first families to move to Heywood from Manchester as part of the slum clearances came in 1963.

Population change in Heywood since 1891
Year	1891	1901	1911	1921	1931	1939	1951	1961	1971	1981	1991	2001
Population	23,185	25,458	26,697	26,693	25,968	25,063	25,201	24,090	30,443	29,686	29,286	28,024
Urban Sanitary District 1891 Municipal Borough 1901–1971 Urban Subdivision 1981–2001

== Economy ==
Heywood Compared
2011 UK Census	Heywood	Rochdale	England
Population of working age	20,754	152,742	38,881,374
Full-time employment	39.7%	36.4%	38.6%
Part-time employment	15.1%	13.2%	13.7%
Self employed	6.9%	7.0%	9.8%
Unemployed	6.6%	5.9%	4.4%
Retired	14.1%	13.7%	13.7%

From the 18th century onwards, Heywood's economy was closely tied with that of Britain's textile manufacture during the Industrial Revolution, particularly the cotton spinning sector. Since deindustrialisation in the 20th century, Heywood's economic activity has been focused around Heywood town centre, and the Heywood Distribution Park, one of the UK's largest single-owned industrial parks. Heywood town centre lies at the convergence of Heywood's Market Street and York Street. Heywood Market Hall on York Street, offers a variety of stalls and small retail outlets. Heywood Distribution Park lies in the south of the town, in Pilsworth, and spans over 200 acres (81 ha). It is part of Segro, a property investment and development company with real estate investment trust status. Heywood Distribution was sold to Segro (then Slough Estates) for £276M, and was one of a number of properties in Greater Manchester that Slough Estates described as "important strategic sites, and provide prime industrial property with high-calibre occupiers as well as development land". It is the largest single-owned distribution park in the region, and has won 16 awards for security. Companies with property in the park include Character Options, Eddie Stobart, Argos, and Shop Direct Group.

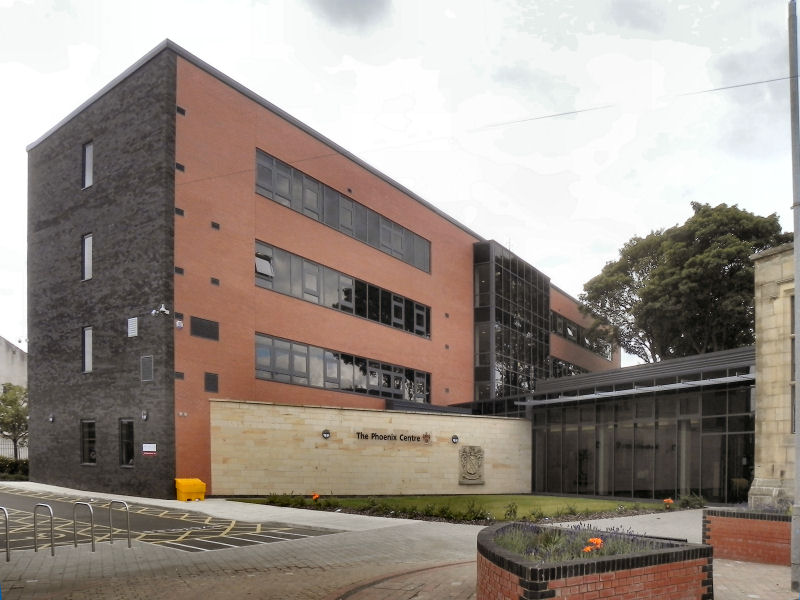
The Phoenix Centre is a health and community services centre opened in 2009 as part of programme to regenerate Heywood.

The whole town is undergoing a major regeneration as part of the government's New Deal for Communities, and New Heart for Heywood are investing around £52 million. The scheme is designed to renew deprived areas. This bid was initially won in 2000 and work to regenerate this town is still ongoing. Some of the planned works for 2006–08 included a new health connections centre, a new family surestart centre, a new primary school (although several are being knocked down as a result) and a multimillion-pound sports and leisure village.

According to the 2001 UK census, the industry of employment of residents aged 16–74 was 24.6% retail and wholesale, 19.2% manufacturing, 10.7% health and social work, 5.5% education, 8.2% transport and communications, 8.1% property and business services, 7.9% construction, 4.2% public administration, 3.8% hotels and restaurants, 3.0% finance, 0.7% energy and water supply, 0.4% agriculture, 0.1 mining and 3.6% other. Compared with national figures, the town had a relatively low percentage working in agriculture. The census recorded the economic activity of residents aged 16–74, 1.9% students were with jobs, 3.3% students without jobs, 5.6% looking after home or family, 8.5% permanently sick or disabled, economically inactive for other reasons. The Heywood Advertiser was founded in the 19th century. The newspaper has a readership of 16,500 and runs its own website.

== Landmarks ==
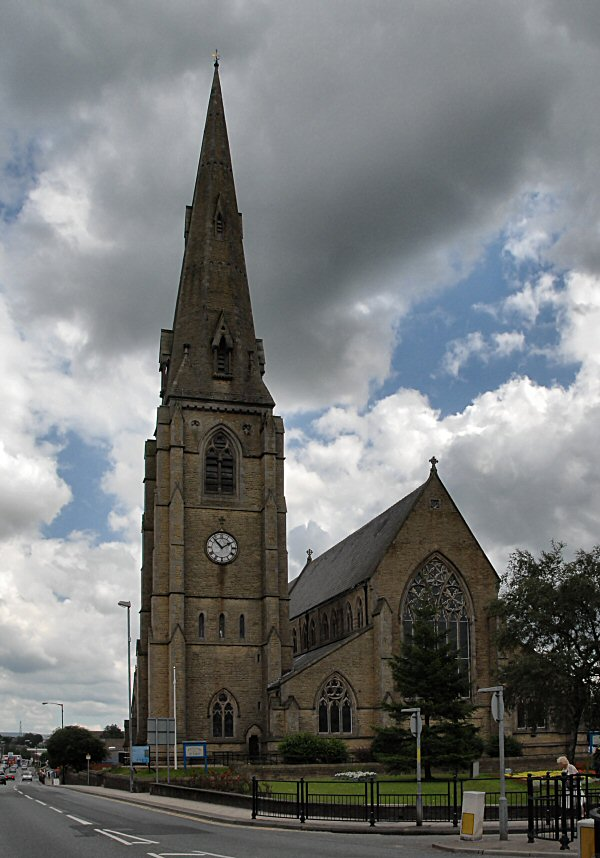
The parish church of St Luke, which originated as a chantry chapel for the Heywood family

Historically, Heywood's only landmark was Heywood Hall, the town's former manor house which was inhabited by the Heywood family. On Heywood in 1881, Edwin Waugh said:

It looks like a great funeral on its way from Bury to Rochdale, consisting of little more than a mile of brick-built cottages and shops. The very dwelling houses look as though they worked in factories

— Edwin Waugh, Lancashire Sketches, 1881

The parish church of St Luke is Heywood's major landmark – the focal point of the town centre. A place of worship at the site of St Luke's is known to have existed prior to 1611. The church started life as a chantry chapel for the Heywood family. The Old Heywood Chapel was demolished in 1859 to make way for the present church, built to the designs of Joseph Clarke. The foundation stone was laid on 31 May 1860, and the building was completed in 1862 using stone from Yorkshire and ashlar from Staffordshire and Bath. St Luke's was consecrated on 8 October 1862 following a public subscription appeal, and dedicated to Luke the Evangelist. The tower and spire is detached from the main church building and stands 188 feet (57 m) high, dominating Heywood's centre and townscape.

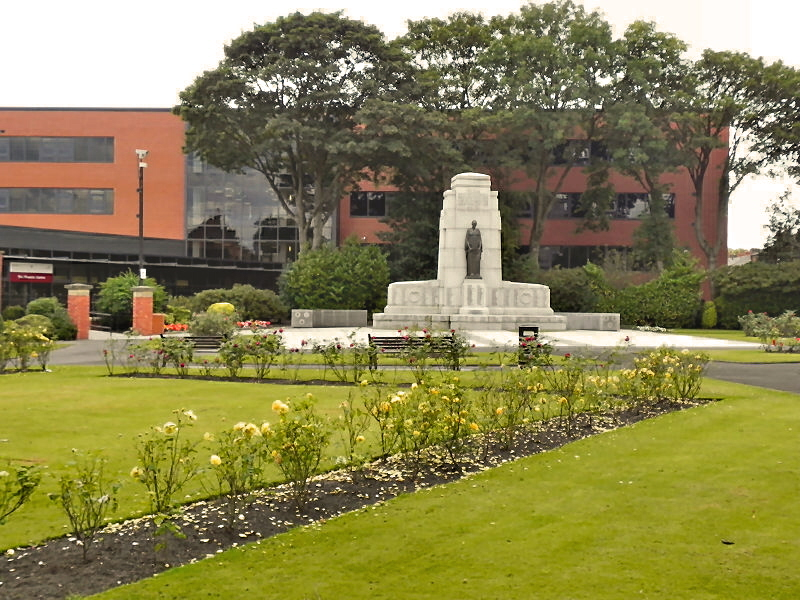
At the time Heywood War Memorial was unveiled in 1925, it did not include a roll of honour as there were insufficient funds for the work. The names were finally engraved in 1986, after a campaign organised by the Royal British Legion secured a grant from Rochdale Metropolitan Borough Council.

Heywood War Memorial lies in Memorial Gardens opposite the Parish Church of St Luke the Evangelist, and was originally erected "to the men of Heywood who gave their lives" during the First World War, but later, the Second World War. It is a grey granite cenotaph decorated with wreaths and crosses. At the front is a bronze female figure holding a laurel wreath to symbolise peace. It was sculpted by Walter Marsden. Heywood War Memorial was commissioned by the Heywood War Memorial Committee and unveiled on 22 August 1925 by Hewlett Johnson, the Dean of Manchester. The roll of honour was not engraved on the memorial at the time of its unveiling owing to a lack of funds. Lobbying by the Heywood branch of the Royal British Legion secured a grant from Rochdale Metropolitan Borough Council to cover the £5,000 required; names from both world wars were engraved in 1986.

Ashworth Valley is a renowned local beauty spot. Queens Park re-opened in 2006 after a multimillion-pound facelift, with many of its Victorian attractions restored, including the old fountain and many of the statues.

== Transport ==
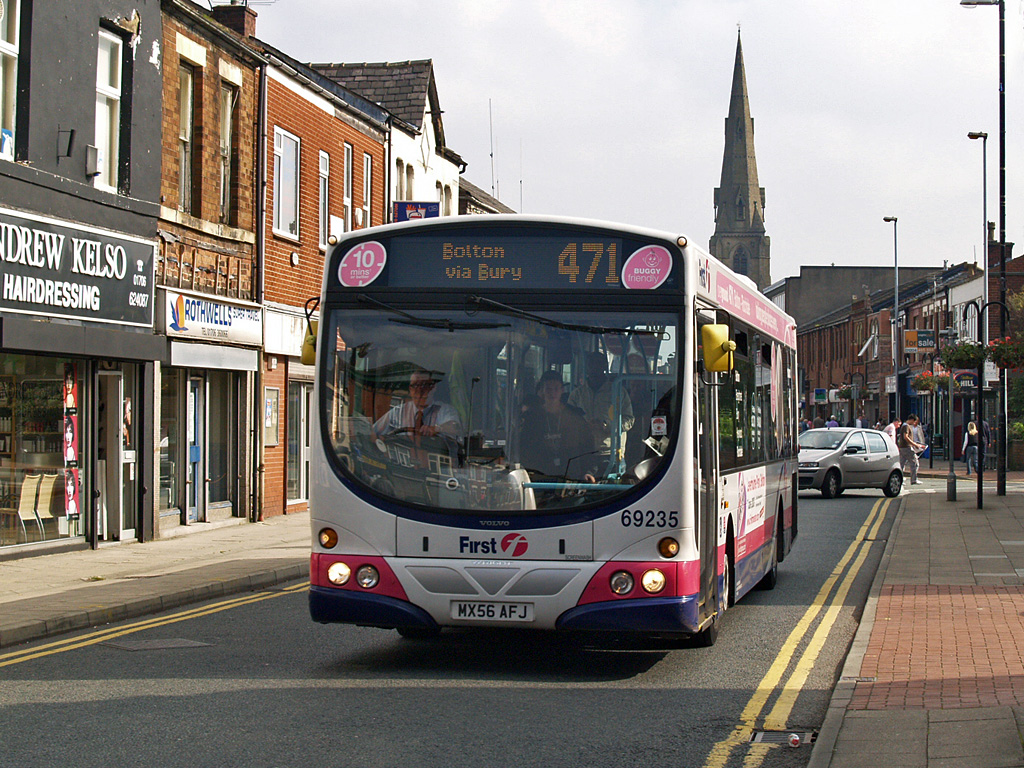
A First Greater Manchester bus in central Heywood. Public transport in Heywood is co-ordinated by Transport for Greater Manchester.

Public transport in Heywood is co-ordinated by Transport for Greater Manchester. Bus services include the 471 to Bolton, Bury, and Rochdale and the 163 to Bury, Darn Hill, Middleton and Manchester, as well as other local services, mainly operated by First Greater Manchester and Rosso. Major A roads link Heywood with other settlements. The M62 motorway passes to the south and can be accessed at Junction 19.

Heywood railway station is on the East Lancashire Railway, a heritage railway which connects Heywood with Rawtenstall railway station via Ramsbottom railway station. The original station opened on the national rail network in 1841 and closed in 1970. It re-opened in 2003 as an extension of the East Lancashire Railway from Bury Bolton Street railway station.

== Education ==
Heywood Technical School was opened on 1 December 1894, on a site then known as the Market Ground. The building, which had technical school status, also contained an art school. The school was doubled in size eighteen years later and opened as the Heywood Day Secondary School. It was renamed 12 years after that as Heywood Grammar School. In 2010 Heywood Community High School closed despite being found outstanding in many areas by Ofsted and being one of the country's most improved schools.

List

- Hopwood County Primary School
- St. Luke's C.E. Primary School
- All Souls' Primary School
- St. Joseph's R.C. Primary School
- Harwood Park Primary School
- Heapbridge Primary School
- Woodland Primary School
- St. Margaret's Primary School
- Our Lady and St Paul's R.C. Primary School
- Newhouse Academy
- Holy Family RC & CE College (Previously St. Joseph's R.C. High School)

=== Birtle View ===
Birtle View was a school for children with special needs. The school closed on 31 August 2007[72], the building has now been demolished and replaced by a doctors' surgery.

== Sports ==
Heywood Cricket Club plays in the Central Lancashire Cricket League. The club has won the Wood Cup on nine occasions since the cup competition began in 1921.

Heywood Hockey Club is a men's field hockey club based in Heywood.

Darnhill and Heywood Amateur Boxing Club is based in Darnhill.

Heywood Sports Culture and Leisure Village is under construction, and was due to open in July 2010.

== Notable people born in Heywood ==
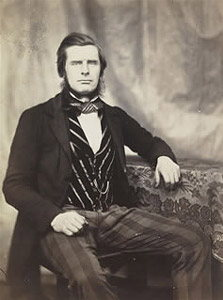
Roger Fenton, one of the first war photographers

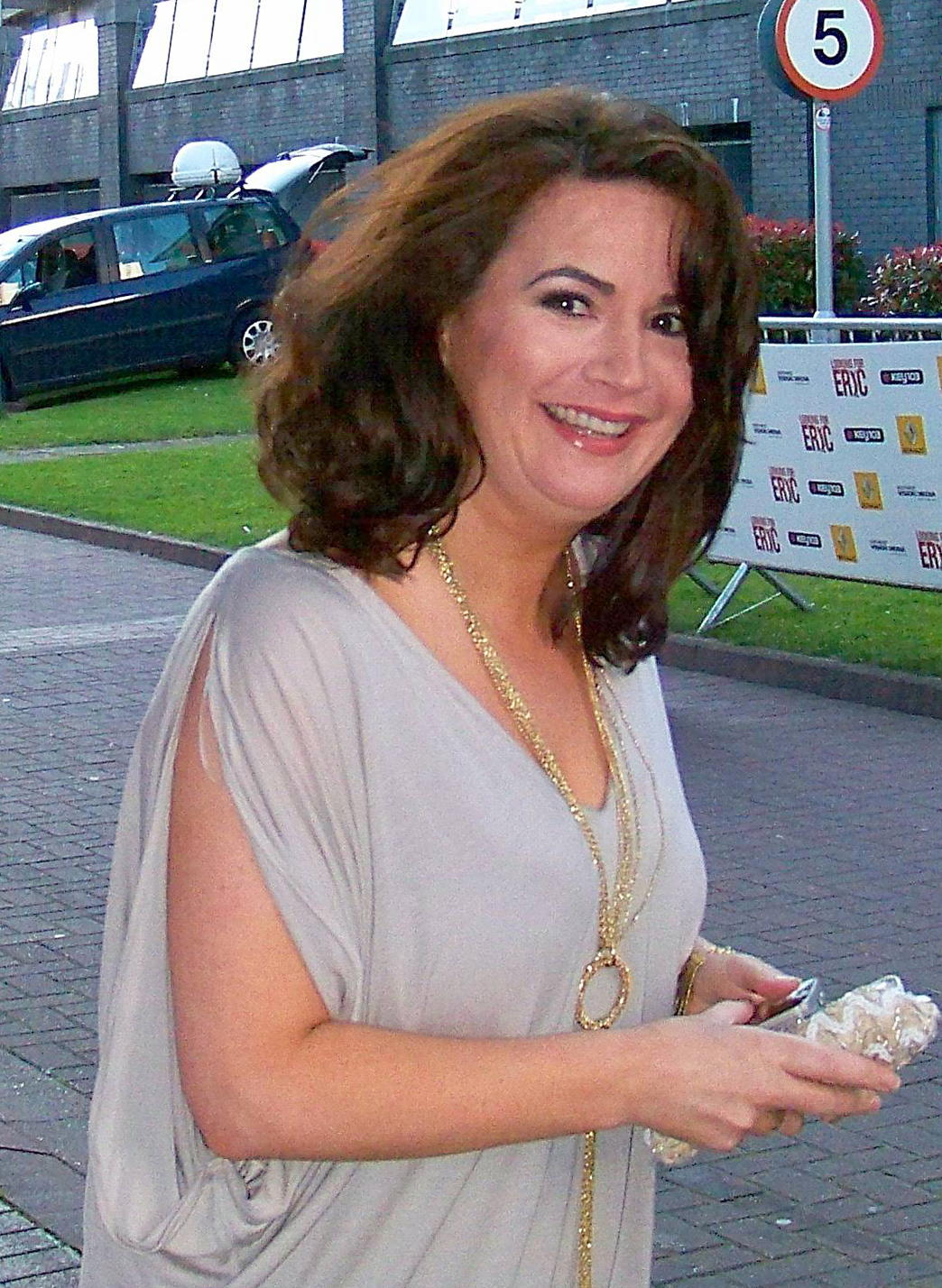
Debbie Rush, who plays Anna Windass in Coronation Street

- Roger Fenton (1819–1869) a pioneering war photographer, was born at Crimble Hall.
- David Malin (born 1941), astrophotographer grew up in the Ashworth Valley area
- Bill Brett, Baron Brett (1942–2012), politician and trade unionist, the son of Irish immigrants.
- Julie Goodyear (born 1942), actress, played Bet Lynch in Coronation Street for many years.
- Air Chief Marshal Sir Malcolm Pledger (born 1948), a retired Royal Air Force officer.
- Anne Kirkbride (1954–2015), late actress, played Deirdre Barlow in Coronation Street lived on Duke Street.
- Ian Simpson (born c. 1955), architect, co-founded SimpsonHaugh and Partners in 1987.
- Mike Hill (born 1963), former politician and MP for Hartlepool from 2017 until his resignation in 2021
- Debbie Rush (born 1966), actress who plays Anna Windass in Coronation Street.
- Lisa Stansfield (born 1966), R&B and soul singer, songwriter and actress, brought up locally.
- Elliott and Luke Tittensor (born 1989), twins, actors, appeared in the soap Brookside.
- Nico Mirallegro (born 1991), actor, who plays Finn Nelson in My Mad Fat Diary.

=== Sport ===
- Malcolm Taylor (1904–1978), cricketer who played 96 first-class matches for Lancashire.
- Horace Fielding (1906–1969), footballer who played over 330 games, starting with 92 at Stockport County
- Peter Kane (1918–1991), world flyweight boxing champion, 1938–39
- Alan Wharton (1923–1993), cricketer, who played 482 First-class cricket games
- Dai Royston Bevan (1928–2008), a Welsh rugby union, and rugby league footballer, he played 160 rugby league games, died locally
- Freddie Goodwin (1933–2016), footballer, played 221 games including 95 at Manchester United
- David Cross (born 1950), footballer who played 599 games including 179 for West Ham United
- Christine Gaskell (born 1957), breaststroke gold medallist at the 1974 British Commonwealth Games, was born, brought up and still lives in Heywood. The community swimming baths, Gaskell Pool, are named in her honour.
- Paul Gerrard (born 1973), football goalkeeper, played 321 games including 119 for Oldham Athletic.
- Keri-anne Payne (born 1987), British swimmer and silver medallist, at the 2008 Summer Olympics, born in Johannesburg, has lived in Heywood since the age of 13.
- Lewis Alessandra (born 1989), footballer who played 562 games in the Football League.
- Ryan Tunnicliffe (born 1992), footballer who played over 330 games, started out at Manchester United
- Benjamin Whiteman (born 1996), footballer who has played over 330 games, including 163 with Preston North End

== Twinned city ==
Heywood is twinned with Peine in Germany

== See also ==
- Listed buildings in Heywood, Greater Manchester
