= Castleton railway station =

Railway station in Greater Manchester, England

Coordinates: 53.5919°N 2.1783°W

Castleton
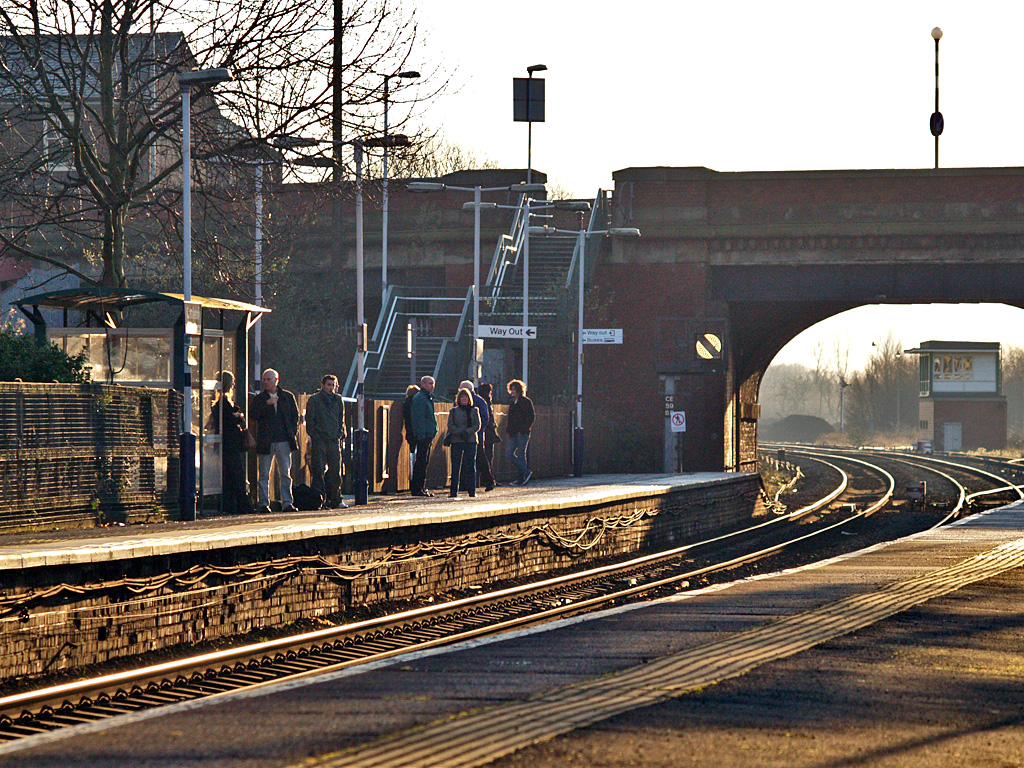

General information
- Location: Castleton, Rochdale; England
- Grid reference: SD883106
- Managed by: Northern Trains
- Platforms: 2

Other information
- Station code: CAS
- Classification: DfT category F1

History
- Opened: 1875

Passengers
- 2020/21: ▼35,900
- 2021/22: ▲78,216
- 2022/23: ▲95,966
- 2023/24: ▲0.132 million
- 2024/25: ▲0.141 million
Location
Notes
- Passenger statistics from the Office of Rail and Road

Castleton railway station serves Castleton in the Metropolitan Borough of Rochdale, Greater Manchester, England. It is 8¾ miles (14 km) north of Manchester Victoria on the Caldervale Line, with services operated by Northern Trains.

== History ==
The original station opened in 1839, at Blue Pits on the western side of the Rochdale-Manchester Road bridge. It was originally called Blue Pits for Heywood. The current station opened on 1 November 1875. The Liverpool and Bury Railway from Bolton (extended through from Bolton and beyond in 1848 to join the earlier M&L Heywood branch previously opened in 1841, which was worked by horses) used to join the main line at a triangular junction a short distance south of the station. This was at one time a busy passenger and freight route often used by trains avoiding the busy Manchester area, but was closed to passengers on 5 October 1970.

The station was also part of the Oldham Loop Line, on which there were through services to Rochdale, via Oldham Mumps. This route was closed in 2009 and has now been converted for light rail use by Manchester Metrolink.

== Facilities ==
The station is not staffed, but a ticket machine is available. Shelters and passenger information screens are located on each platform and both have step-free access from the street; there are also staircases from Manchester Road bridge to both platforms.

== Services ==
On Monday to Saturday daytimes, Northern Trains operates a half-hourly service in each direction. The basic pattern is for trains to start at Rochdale, then stop at all stations to Manchester Victoria, then via Salford Central, Salford Crescent, Bolton and Darwen to Blackburn, with alternate trains continuing through to Clitheroe. The station is served by Class 150, Class 156, Class 158 and Class 195 DMUs.

On Sundays, the service pattern a 1 train per hour in between Manchester Victoria, Rochdale, Todmorden, Burnley, Accrington and Blackburn. There is 1 train every 2 hours to Manchester Victoria and 1 train every 2 hours to Blackburn.

Preceding station	National Rail	Following station
Mills Hill	Northern; Caldervale Line	Rochdale
Preceding station	Heritage railways	Following station
Proposed extension
Heywood Line closed, station open towards Rawtenstall	East Lancashire Railway	Terminus
Disused railways
Heywood; Line closed, station open	Lancashire and Yorkshire Railway	Rochdale; Line and station open

== East Lancashire Railway future ==
The western portion of this line was retained for freight traffic after passenger trains ceased (serving the coal depot at Rawtenstall until 1980 and subsequently to the Powell Duffryn wagon works); it now forms the link with the East Lancashire Railway heritage route at Heywood.

The heritage line plans to extend its services along and towards a possible new bay platform adjacent to the main station in the future, subject to permission being granted by Network Rail.

The bay platform, named Castleton Village, will be adjacent to the main station at Castleton, from where passengers could alight and change station sides directly to Northern Trains' services on the national network. Rochdale Council commissioned a study by transport consultants Mouchel in conjunction with the ELR regarding the proposals in 2010; their report covers the tourism and regeneration aspects of any such future development.
