= Cardinal Langley Roman Catholic High School =

Cardinal Langley Roman Catholic High School & Sixth Form
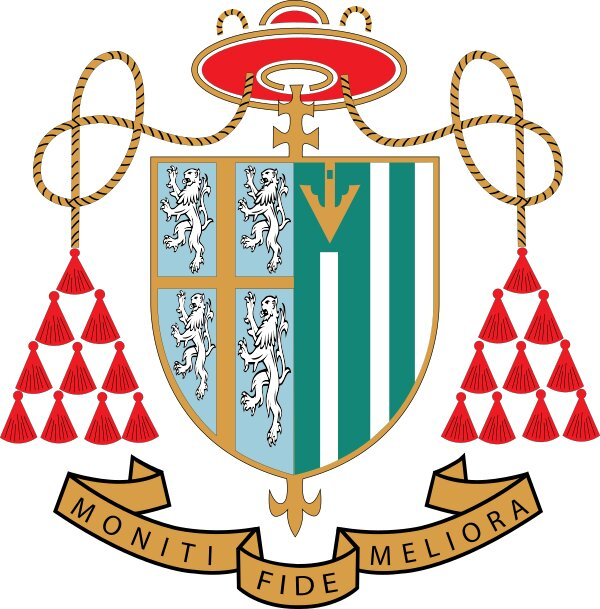

Location
- Rochdale Road; Stanycliffe; Middleton, Greater Manchester, M24 2GL; England; 53°33′54″N 2°10′59″W

Information
- Type: Voluntary aided school
- Motto: Moniti Fide Meliora
- Religious affiliation: Roman Catholic
- Established: 1959
- Founders: De La Salle Brothers
- Local authority: Rochdale
- Department for Education URN: 105844 Tables
- Ofsted: Reports
- Head teacher: A Bridson
- Gender: Mixed
- Age: 11 to 18
- Enrolment: 1189
- Colours: Black and Red
- Website: https://www.clrchs.co.uk/

The Cardinal Langley Roman Catholic High School is a Roman Catholic secondary school in Middleton, Greater Manchester, England, for ages 11–18. The school is named for Thomas Langley, a 15th-century prelate who hailed from Middleton.

== Location ==
Cardinal Langley school is on Rochdale Road (A664), around one mile from the end of the Middleton spur of the A627(M). Hopwood Hall College and Hopwood Clough Nature Reserve are nearby to the north-west. .

== History ==
=== Grammar school ===
It opened under the supervision of the De La Salle Brothers in September 1959 as a grammar school with the first two years, gradually increasing year by year. The second year students were drawn from existing grammar schools in the area.

In the second year of existence the building work had not been completed and hence students attended on a half day basis. It was administered by Lancashire Education Committee and by 1967 had 780 boys. In 1974, it was taken over by the Metropolitan Borough of Rochdale. Since then, the number of De La Salle brothers teaching at the school reduced and by the early 1990s all Lasallian brothers had left.

=== Comprehensive ===
It became a comprehensive in 1979.

== Academic performance ==
An Ofsted inspection undertaken on 9 May 2017 judged the school to be "good", in all inspected areas, including the sixth form college.

It gets GCSE results slightly above average, but at A-level it performs better, receiving the best results in Rochdale LEA.

== Notable former pupils ==
=== Cardinal Langley RC Grammar School ===
- Maartin Allcock (b 1957), musician
- Clint Boon (b 1959), Inspiral Carpets and DJ
- Mike Pickering (b 1954), DJ at The Hacienda, M People musician and A&R consultant
- Brendan Coogan (b 1970), television presenter
- Martin Coogan (b 1961), singer-songwriter, DJ
- Steve Coogan (b 1965), actor and comedian
- Steve Cowan, drummer with The Mock Turtles, from Alkrington
- Paul O'Brien CBE FRS (b 1954), Professor of Chemistry at the University of Manchester
- Kieran Prendiville (b 1947), television presenter, writer
- Pearce Quigley, actor
- John Richmond (b 1960), fashion designer
- Stephen Gaukroger

=== Cardinal Langley RC High School ===
- JP Cooper (b 1983) singer/songwriter
- Liam Fray (b 1985), musician The Courteeners
- Matt Greenwood (b 1995), actor
- Jane Hazlegrove (b 1968), actress
- Suranne Jones (b 1978), actress
- Kavana (b 1977), pop artist
- Keri-Anne Payne (b 1987), swimmer and Olympic silver medalist
- Paul Scholes (b 1974), footballer
