= Bowlee =

Coordinates: 53.553°N 2.237°W

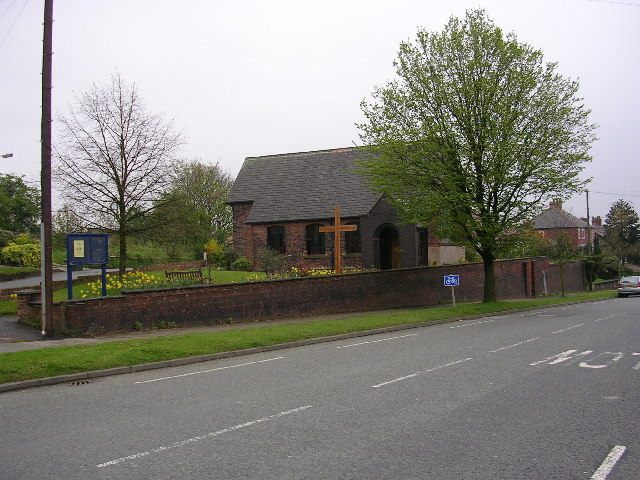
- St Thomas' Church, Bowlee

- Location within Greater Manchester
- OS grid reference: SD843063
- Metropolitan borough: Rochdale
- Metropolitan county: Greater Manchester
- Region: North West
- Country: England
- Sovereign state: United Kingdom
- Post town: MANCHESTER
- Postcode district: M24
- Dialling code: 0161
- Police: Greater Manchester
- Fire: Greater Manchester
- Ambulance: North West
- UK Parliament: Heywood and Middleton

Bowlee is a village in Greater Manchester, England. Bowlee is situated along the Heywood Old Road (A6045) on the outskirts of Middleton between Rhodes and Heywood. Historically it forms part of Lancashire.

== Geography ==
Bowlee is located north of Rhodes, south of Heywood and Birch and west of Middleton. Like much of the British Isles, the area experiences a temperate maritime climate. The A6045 passes through Bowlee, whilst the M60 passes west of the village

== RAF Bowlee ==
The RAF acquired 110 acres (0.45 km^{2}) of land between Bowlee and the nearby village of Birch: 54 acres (220,000 m^{2}) of land were acquired from the Langley Hall Estate plus 56 acres (230,000 m^{2}) from Manchester Corporation. This included Bowlee Farm land and 6 acres (24,000 m^{2}) of Parkside Farm.

== Car boot sales ==
Large regular car boots sales are held during the summer months at the Bowlee Community Park.

== Public transport ==
The area is served by bus service 125 which is the Middleton, Birch, Langley, Heywood route.
