= Birch, Greater Manchester =

Village in Greater Manchester, England

Coordinates: 53°33′56″N 2°13′33″W

Birch
- Location within Greater Manchester
- Area: 0.09 sq mi (0.23 km^{2})
- OS grid reference: SD875065
  - London: 167.58 miles
- Metropolitan borough: Rochdale
- Metropolitan county: Greater Manchester
- Region: North West
- Country: England
- Sovereign state: United Kingdom
- Post town: HEYWOOD
- Postcode district: OL10
- Dialling code: 0161
- Police: Greater Manchester
- Fire: Greater Manchester
- Ambulance: North West
- UK Parliament: Heywood and Middleton North

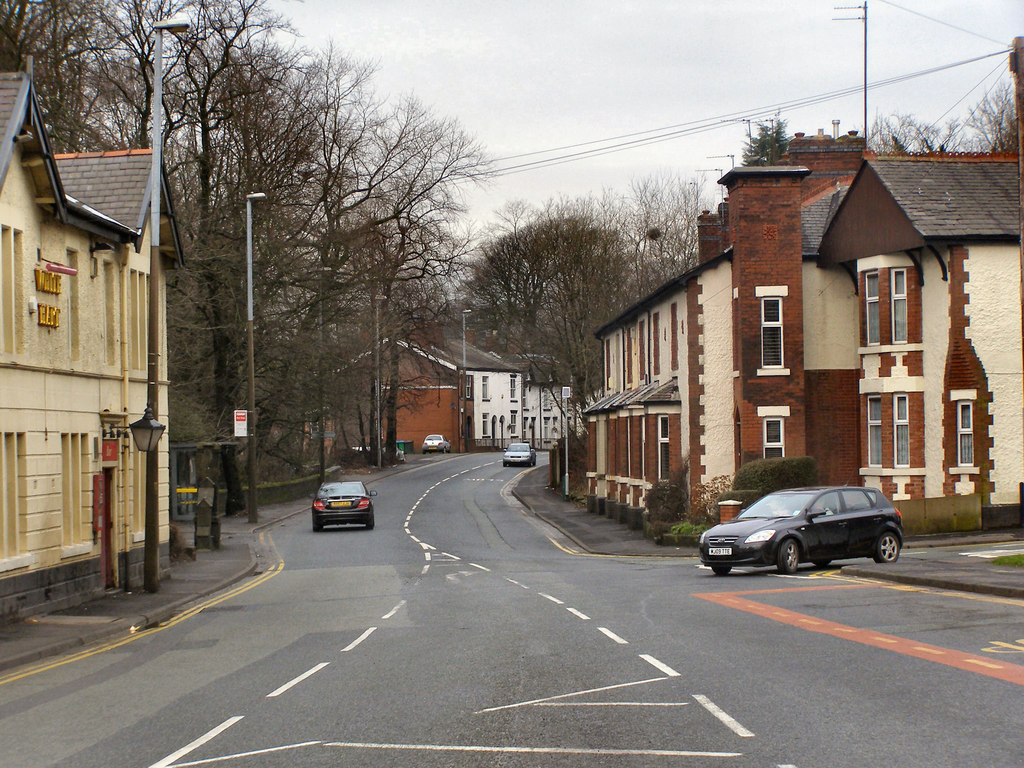
A6045 road passing through Birch

Birch, also known as Birch-in-Hopwood, is a village 2/3 of a mile northwest of Middleton, Greater Manchester, England.

== Amenities ==
The White Hart pub is located on Heywood Old Road. St. Mary's Church is a Church of England church located on Langley Lane.

The Birch Hotel is a 30 bedroom hotel located on Manchester Road in the north of the town, originally built as a home for a wealthy mine owner. As of February 2026, the hotel is now closed.

The Edgar Wood Academy is a secondary school located south of Birch near Bowlee that provides education for 11-16 year olds.

David Lloyd Clubs operates its North Manchester branch in Bowlee.

== Governance ==
Lying within the historic county boundaries of Lancashire from the early 12th century, Birch was located in the hundred of Salford.

Today Birch forms part of the Heywood and Middleton North parliamentary constituency, represented in the House of Commons by Elsie Blundell of the Labour Party.

== Geography ==
Birch stands on undulated land north of Manchester; Rhodes is to the south, Langley is to the East, and Middleton is to the southeast. The town of Rochdale also lies to the northeast, Heywood to the north, and Bury to the northwest. Simister and Prestwich are also to the southwest. The land use immediately surrounding Birch is predominantly rural

Birch experiences a temperate maritime climate, like much of the British Isles, with relatively cool summers and mild winters. There is regular but generally light precipitation throughout the year.

Whittle Brook is a stream that flows south before eventually joining Hollins Brook & the River Roch near Hollins.

== Transport ==
The M62 passes through the north of the village. The nearest junction is at Hopwood. Birch Services are also located here. The M60 passes west of the town.

The main thoroughfare in Birch is the A6045 Heywood Old Road/Manchester Road between Rhodes and Heywood.

The Bee Network 125 bus between Middleton and Heywood runs through the town.

== Gallery ==
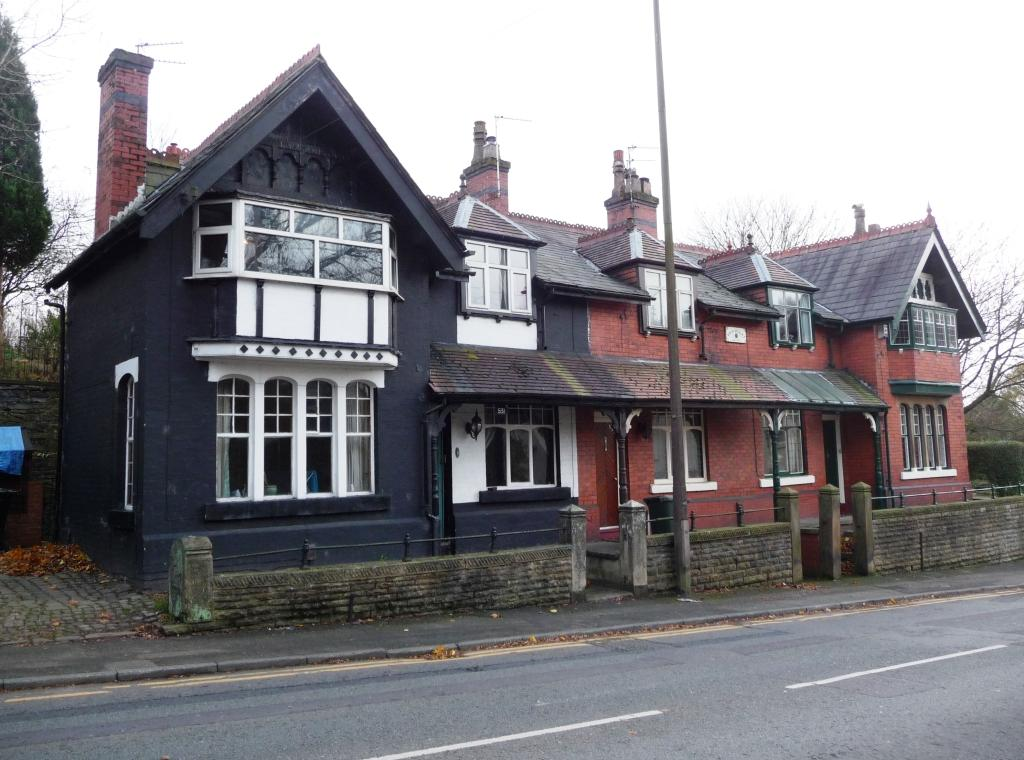
Birch Villas, Langley Lane, Birch

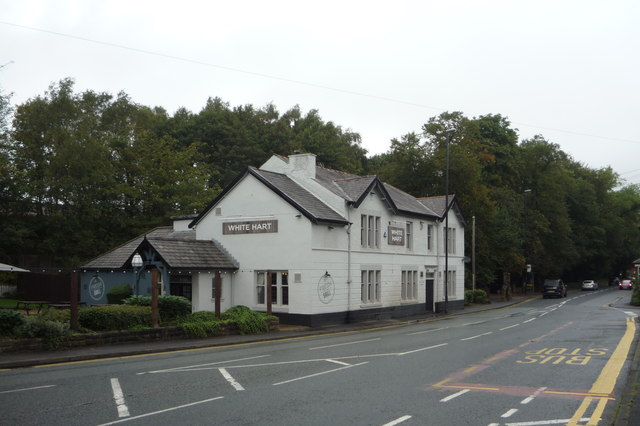
The White Hart, Heywood Old Road, Birch

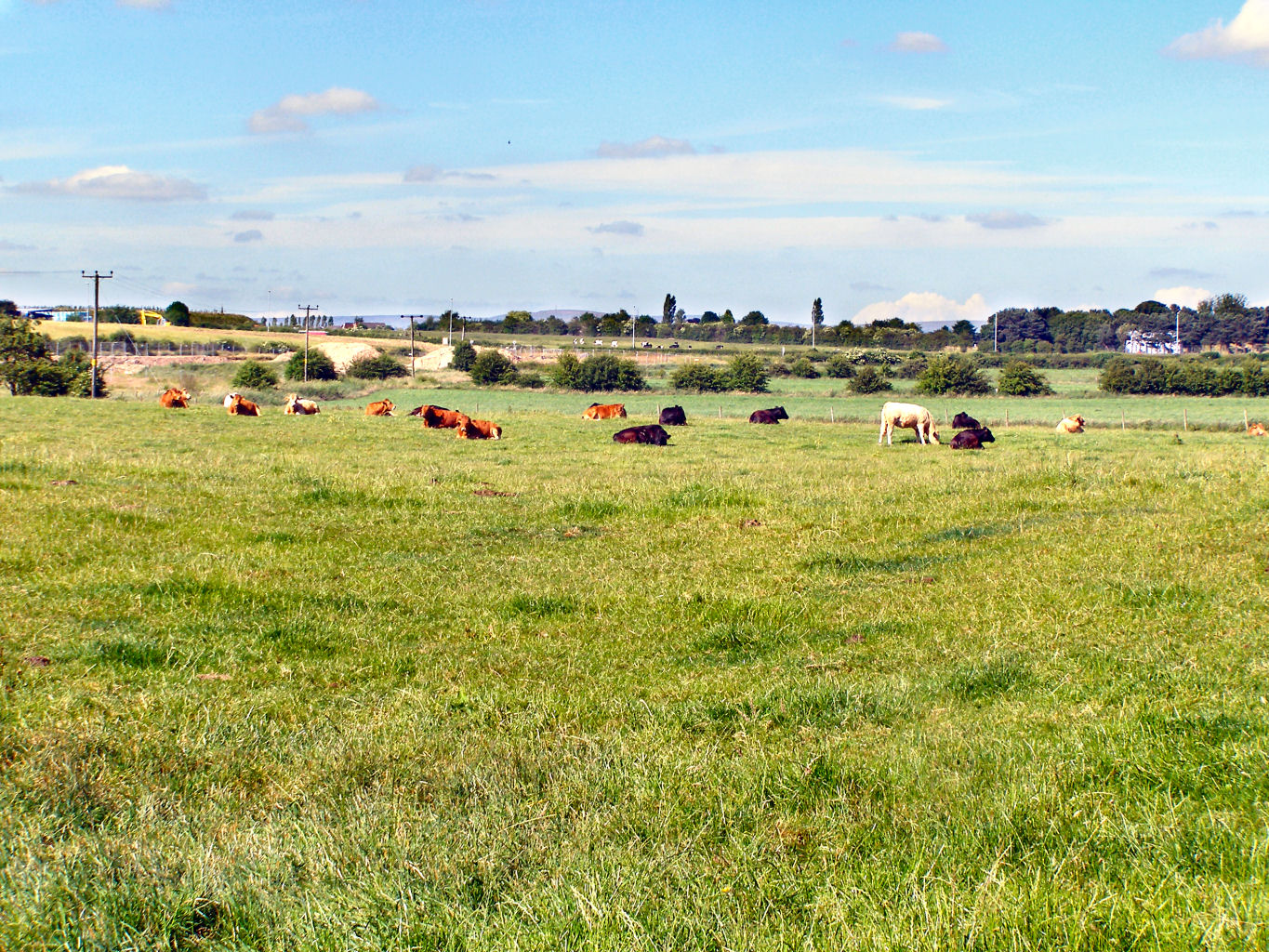
Farmland near Birch

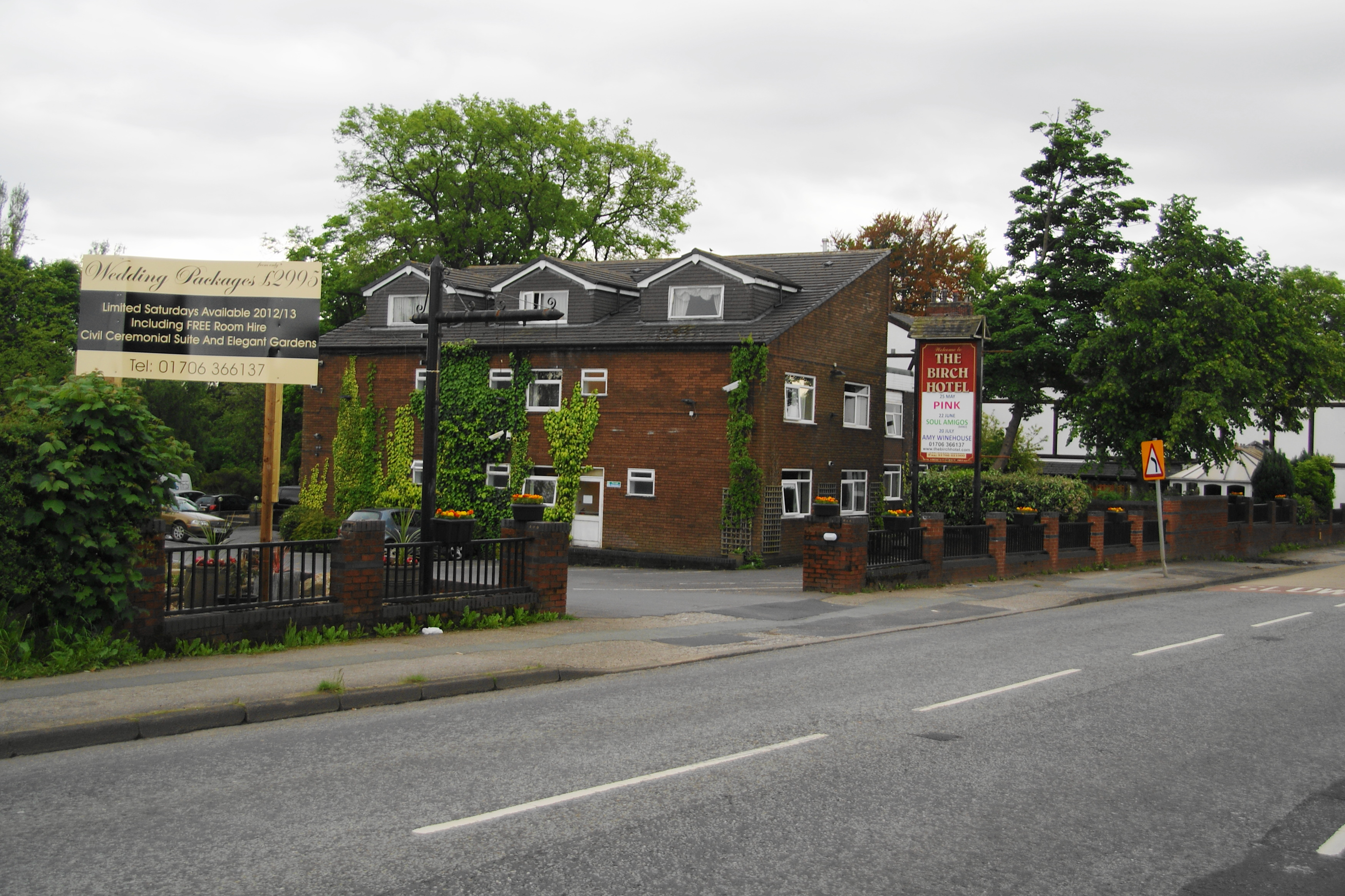
The Birch Hotel, Manchester Road, Birch

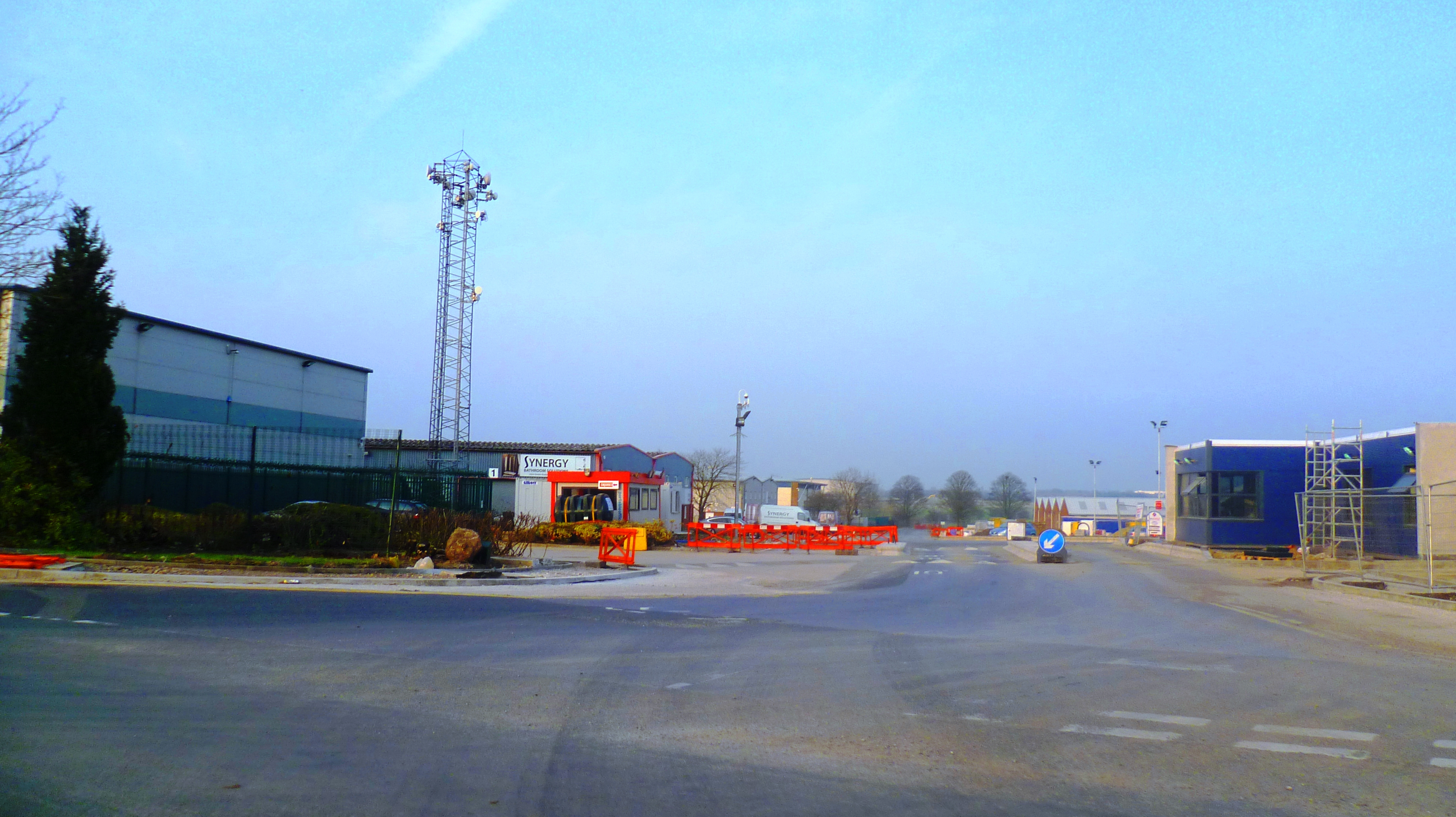
Birch Industrial Estate
