= Blackley and Middleton South =

UK Parliament constituency (since 2024)

- Borough constituency for the House of Commons
- Interactive map of boundaries since 2024
- Location within North West England
- County: Greater Manchester
- Electorate: 71,735 (March 2020)
- Major settlements: Blackley, Middleton

Current constituency
- Created: 2024
- Member of Parliament: Graham Stringer (Labour)
- Seats: One
- Created from: Blackley and Broughton, Heywood and Middleton, Manchester Central (part)

Blackley and Middleton South is a constituency of the House of Commons in the UK Parliament, in Northern Greater Manchester.

Created as a result of the 2023 review of Westminster constituencies, it was first contested at the 2024 general election. Since 2024, it has been represented by Labour's Graham Stringer, who was MP for the predecessor seats of Blackley and Broughton (2010–2024) and Manchester Blackley (1997–2010).

The constituency includes the northern suburban areas of Manchester as well as half of the town of Middleton.

== Constituency profile ==
The seat covers a mostly residential area in the north of the City of Manchester with the southern half of Middleton in the borough of Rochdale. The areas are joined by major roads with many small parks and two of Manchester City Council's largest green spaces, Heaton Park which is one of the largest municipal parks in Europe and hosts the annual Parklife concert, and Boggart Hole Clough, a large ancient woodland in Blackley towards the east. There is also Alkrington Woods Nature Reserve, and the nearby M60 motorway separates Middleton from Blackley.

Blackley itself is a residential area at the northern half of the seat, and Crumpsall is an increasingly diverse suburb including North Manchester General Hospital, one of the 'new hospitals' set for redevelopment, while the inner-city Harpurhey and Collyhurst districts have a high proportion of social housing and have faced problems with deprivation, and are amongst some of the most deprived areas in the country. Relatively more affluent areas include Alkrington Garden Village in the southern part of Middleton. It is amongst the ten constituencies with the largest Jewish population, of around 8000 in 2015.

Heaton Park, with Manchester city centre in the distance.

The constituency voted Leave in the European referendum in 2016 and the incumbent, Graham Stringer was a prominent Vote Leave supporter.

== Boundaries ==
Following the 2023 boundary review, the constituency is composed of the following wards from the 2024 election (as they existed on 1 December 2020):

- The City of Manchester wards of: Charlestown; Crumpsall; Harpurhey; Higher Blackley; Moston.
- The Metropolitan Borough of Rochdale wards of: East Middleton; South Middleton.

The seat covers the majority of the former Blackley and Broughton constituency - excluding the parts in the City of Salford (Broughton) as well as the City of Manchester district of Cheetham. The two Middleton wards (which include Alkrington Garden Village and Rhodes) were formerly part of Heywood and Middleton (renamed Heywood and Middleton North), and Moston was transferred in from Manchester Central.

== Elections ==
=== Elections in the 2020s ===
General election 2024: Blackley and Middleton South
Party	Candidate	Votes	%	±%
Labour	Graham Stringer	16,864	53.8	▼5.2
Reform	Alison Devine	6,614	21.1	▲13.4
Green	Dylan Lewis-Creser	3,197	10.2	▲8.2
Conservative	Iftikhar Ahmed	3,073	9.8	▼18.4
Liberal Democrats	Iain Donaldson	1,592	5.1	▲2.1
Majority		10,220	32.7	▲1.9
Total valid votes		31,340	43.5	▼9.1
Rejected ballots		149	0.5	
Turnout		31,489	43.7	
Registered electors		72,097		
Labour hold		Swing	▼9.3	

=== Elections in the 2010s ===
2019 notional result
Party	Vote	%
Labour	22,157	59.0
Conservative	10,599	28.2
Brexit Party	2,898	7.7
Liberal Democrats	1,130	3.0
Green	764	2.0
Turnout	37,548	52.6
Electorate	71,375	
