= Pamela Coward =

Dame Pamela Sarah Coward, DBE was a British educator and teacher who was created a Dame Commander of the Order of the British Empire in 2003 for having transformed her school, Middleton Technology School, in Middleton, Greater Manchester.

She is a champion of the specialist schools scheme – hers was one of the first technology specialists. Since 1991 she has taken Middleton Technology School from the bottom to the top of the performance tables locally, recently being praised by Ofsted for the quality of its teaching and her leadership.

Coward said that the honour belongs to the whole community for their support. In her own words,

The challenge really is to eradicate street values from the school and to get everybody involved, to get parents supportive and to feel that education is valuable and to give children the confidence to feel they can compete with anyone anywhere.

== Post-retirement ==
Coward retired in 2004 and now works as on a consultancy basis to other schools and establishments. Since September 2010 Coward has been the Chair of Governors at Kingsway Park High School, Rochdale.
