= Blackley and Broughton =

UK Parliament constituency (2010–2024)

Coordinates: 53.510°N 2.202°W

- Former borough constituency for the House of Commons
- Boundary of Blackley and Broughton in Greater Manchester

- Location of Greater Manchester within England
- County: Greater Manchester
- Population: 110,754 (2011 census)
- Electorate: 69,006 (December 2010)
- Major settlements: Blackley, Broughton, Cheetham Hill, Crumpsall

2010–2024
- Seats: One
- Created from: Manchester Blackley and part of Salford
- Replaced by: Blackley and Middleton South, Bury South, and Salford

Blackley and Broughton (Blayk-lee and Brore-tun) /ˈbleɪkli ænd brɔːtən/ was a constituency (Note: A borough constituency (for the purposes of election expenses and type of returning officer)) in the House of Commons of the UK Parliament located in Northern Greater Manchester between 2010 and 2024. It was preceded by Manchester Blackley and succeeded by Blackley and Middleton South.

It was represented through its entire existence by Graham Stringer. He was first elected in 1997 for the former Manchester Blackley and prior to this was leader of Manchester City Council. The constituency covered Suburban north Manchester and east Salford. (Note: As with all constituencies after 1950, the constituency elected one Member of Parliament (MP) by the first past the post system of election at least every five years.)

Further to the completion of the 2023 Periodic Review of Westminster constituencies, the seat was subject to major boundary changes, including the loss of its two City of Salford wards (Broughton), and Kersal and Broughton Park to Salford and Bury South respectively, and the addition of two Borough of Rochdale wards (Middleton South). Accordingly, the seat was renamed Blackley and Middleton South, a constituency which was first contested at the 2024 general election.

== Boundaries ==
Map of boundaries 2010–2024

The City of Manchester wards of Charlestown, Cheetham, Crumpsall, Harpurhey, and Higher Blackley; and the City of Salford wards of Broughton and Kersal.

Formed following the Boundary Commission for England's review of parliamentary representation in Greater Manchester, this seat is a cross-border constituency with electoral wards from Salford City Council and Manchester City Council. This redrawn constituency uses the River Irwell as the eastern border with Salford and Eccles. The constituency of Blackley and Broughton is the successor seat to Manchester Blackley.

This is one of only five seats in the UK that each cover two cities, in this case Manchester and Salford. The others in England are Cities of London and Westminster in Central London, and Morley and Outwood in West Yorkshire, which includes parts of Leeds and Wakefield. In Northern Ireland, the two cities of Newry and Armagh are included in the constituency of that name, and Belfast West includes part of the city of Lisburn.

== Constituency profile ==
The seat covers a mostly residential area, major roads with many small parks and two large green spaces, Heaton Park which is one of the largest municipal parks in Europe and hosts the annual Parklife concert, and Boggart Hole Clough, a large ancient woodland in Blackley towards the east. A diverse constituency which stretches from the city centre's outskirts (including Manchester Arena and the Strangeways Prison), featuring a large Asian population in Cheetham and Orthodox Jewish populations in parts of Crumpsall and the Salford suburbs of Broughton and Kersal. There is also an above-average number of Irish (the Irish World Heritage Centre is based here) and other European residents.

Blackley itself is a mostly owner occupied, suburban residential area at the northern half of the seat, while the inner-city Harpurhey district has a high proportion of social housing and has faced problems with deprivation, and is mostly white working-class. More affluent areas include Higher Kersal and the Broughton Park area, with leafy roads and large detached houses.

The Constituency narrowly voted Leave in the European referendum in 2016 and the incumbent, Graham Stringer was a prominent Vote Leave supporter.

== History ==
Results of the Incumbent party

Most of the area has been held by Labour since 1964.

Results of other parties

In 2019, the Conservatives came second with 24.6% vote share a 3% increase again from 2017. The Conservatives came second in 2017, with 21.6% of the vote, a 7% increase on the 2015 election.

A March 2017 by-election saw the Conservatives win the ward of Kersal within the constituency from Labour and in the 2018 Local Elections another Conservative candidate was elected meaning the Conservatives now hold 2/3 Salford City Council seats in the area.

The 2015 general election saw much more than the national average swing (+16.5%) to the UKIP candidate (compared with 9.5% nationwide). UKIP came second overall.

Turnout

At the 2019 General Election, turnout fell by 3.3% to 52.8%, for the first time since the constituency was created in 2010, having risen from 49.7% in 2010 and to 56.1% of electors in 2017. In 2019 the constituency had the 5th lowest turnout in the country, and the lowest of all the Manchester seats.

== Members of Parliament ==
Election	Member	Party
2010	Graham Stringer	Labour

== Elections ==
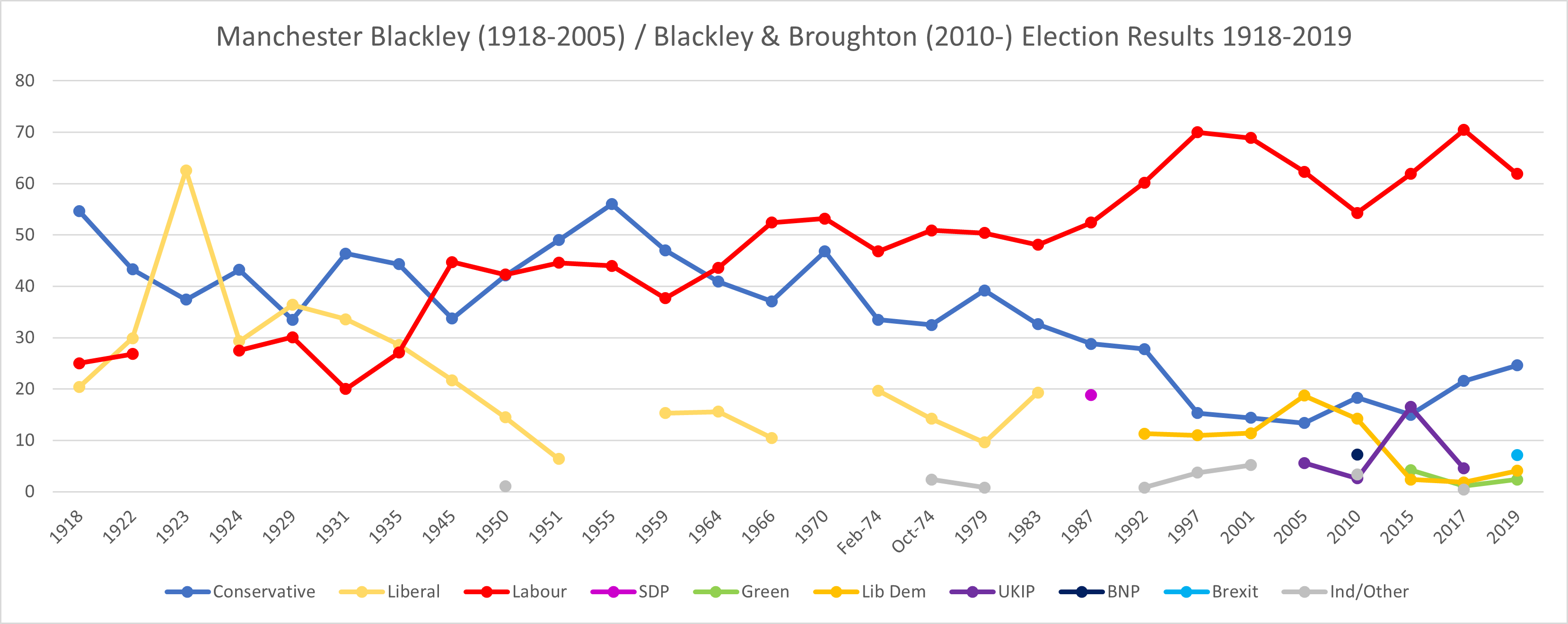

=== Elections in the 2010s ===
General election 2019: Blackley and Broughton
Party	Candidate	Votes	%	±%
Labour	Graham Stringer	23,887	61.9	−8.6
Conservative	Alexander Elias	9,485	24.6	+3.0
Brexit Party	James Buckley	2,736	7.1	New
Liberal Democrats	Iain Donaldson	1,590	4.1	+2.3
Green	David Jones	920	2.4	+1.3
Majority		14,402	37.3	−11.6
Turnout		38,618	52.8	−3.3
Labour hold		Swing	−5.8	

General election 2017: Blackley and Broughton
Party	Candidate	Votes	%	±%
Labour	Graham Stringer	28,258	70.5	+8.6
Conservative	David Goss	8,657	21.6	+6.6
UKIP	Martin Power	1,825	4.6	−12.0
Liberal Democrats	Richard Gadsden	737	1.8	−0.6
Green	David Jones	462	1.15	−3.1
CPA	Abi Ajoku	174	0.4	New
Majority		19,601	48.87	+3.4
Turnout		40,113	56.13	+4.5
Labour hold		Swing	+1.0	

General election 2015: Blackley and Broughton
Party	Candidate	Votes	%	±%
Labour	Graham Stringer	22,982	61.9	+7.6
UKIP	Martin Power	6,108	16.5	+13.9
Conservative	Michelle Tanfield-Johnson	5,581	15.0	−3.3
Green	David Jones	1,567	4.2	New
Liberal Democrats	Richard Gadsden	874	2.4	−11.8
Majority		16,874	45.4	+9.4
Turnout		37,112	51.6	+2.9
Labour hold		Swing	−3.0	

General election 2010: Blackley and Broughton
Party	Candidate	Votes	%	±%
Labour	Graham Stringer	18,563	54.3	
Conservative	James Edsberg	6,260	18.3	
Liberal Democrats	William Hobhouse	4,861	14.2	
BNP	Derek Adams	2,469	7.2	
Respect	Kay Phillips	996	2.9	
UKIP	Robert Willescroft	894	2.6	
Christian	Shafiq uz Zaman	161	0.5	
Majority		12,303	36.0	
Turnout		34,204	49.7	
Labour win (new seat)				

== See also ==
- List of parliamentary constituencies in Greater Manchester
