= Middleton, Greater Manchester =

Town in Greater Manchester, England

Coordinates: 53.555°N 2.187°W

Middleton
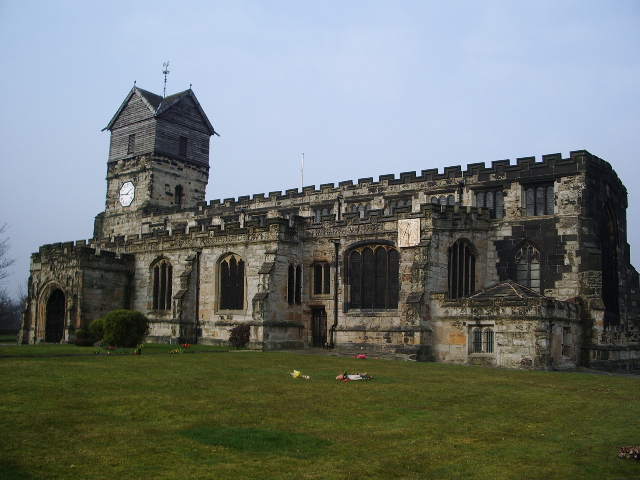
- St Leonard's Parish Church

- Location within Greater Manchester
- Area: 8.94 sq mi (23.2 km^{2})
- Population: 42,972 (2011 census)
  - Density: 4,807/sq mi (1,856/km^{2})
- OS grid reference: SD875065
  - London: 190 miles
- Metropolitan borough: Metropolitan Borough of Rochdale
- Metropolitan county: Greater Manchester
- Region: North West
- Country: England
- Sovereign state: United Kingdom
- Post town: Manchester
- Postcode district: M24
- Dialling code: 0161
- Police: Greater Manchester
- Fire: Greater Manchester
- Ambulance: North West
- UK Parliament: Blackley and Middleton South; Heywood and Middleton North

Middleton is a town in the Metropolitan Borough of Rochdale, Greater Manchester, England. It lies on the river Irk, 5 miles (8 km) south-west of Rochdale and 5 miles (8 km) north-east of Manchester, with Blackley to the south and Moston to the south-east. Middleton had a population of 42,972 at the 2011 census.

== History ==
Historically part of Lancashire, Middleton's name comes from it being the centre of several circumjacent settlements. It was an ecclesiastical parish of the hundred of Salford, ruled by aristocratic families. The Church of St Leonard is a grade I listed building. The Flodden Window in the church's sanctuary is thought to be the oldest war memorial in the United Kingdom, memorialising the archers of Middleton who fought at the Battle of Flodden in 1513. In 1770, Middleton was a village of twenty houses but, in the 18th and 19th centuries, it grew into a thriving and populous seat of textile manufacture and it was granted municipal borough status in 1886.

"Moonraker" is a nickname occasionally given to people from the town.

=== Pre-1700 ===
In 616, Æthelfrith of Bernicia, an Anglo-Saxon King, crossed the Pennines with an army and passed through Manchester to defeat the Brythons in the Battle of Chester. A wave of Anglian colonists followed this military conquest and their settlements are identified by the ton Old English suffix to local place names. Royton, Crompton, Moston, Clayton, Ashton, Chadderton and Middleton are a number of settlements north-east of Manchester suggested to have been founded as part of this colonisation. It is therefore thought that Middleton as a settlement dates from the seventh century.

Although unmentioned in the Domesday Book of 1086, Middleton is said to be "of great antiquity"; a community at Middleton is thought to have evolved outwards from a church that existed considerably earlier than the Norman conquest of England.

The name Middleton first appears in 1194, and derives from the Old English middel-tūn, meaning middle farm or settlement, probably a reference to its central position between Rochdale and Manchester.

During the Middle Ages, Middleton was a centre of domestic flannel and woollen cloth production.

=== 1700-1900 ===
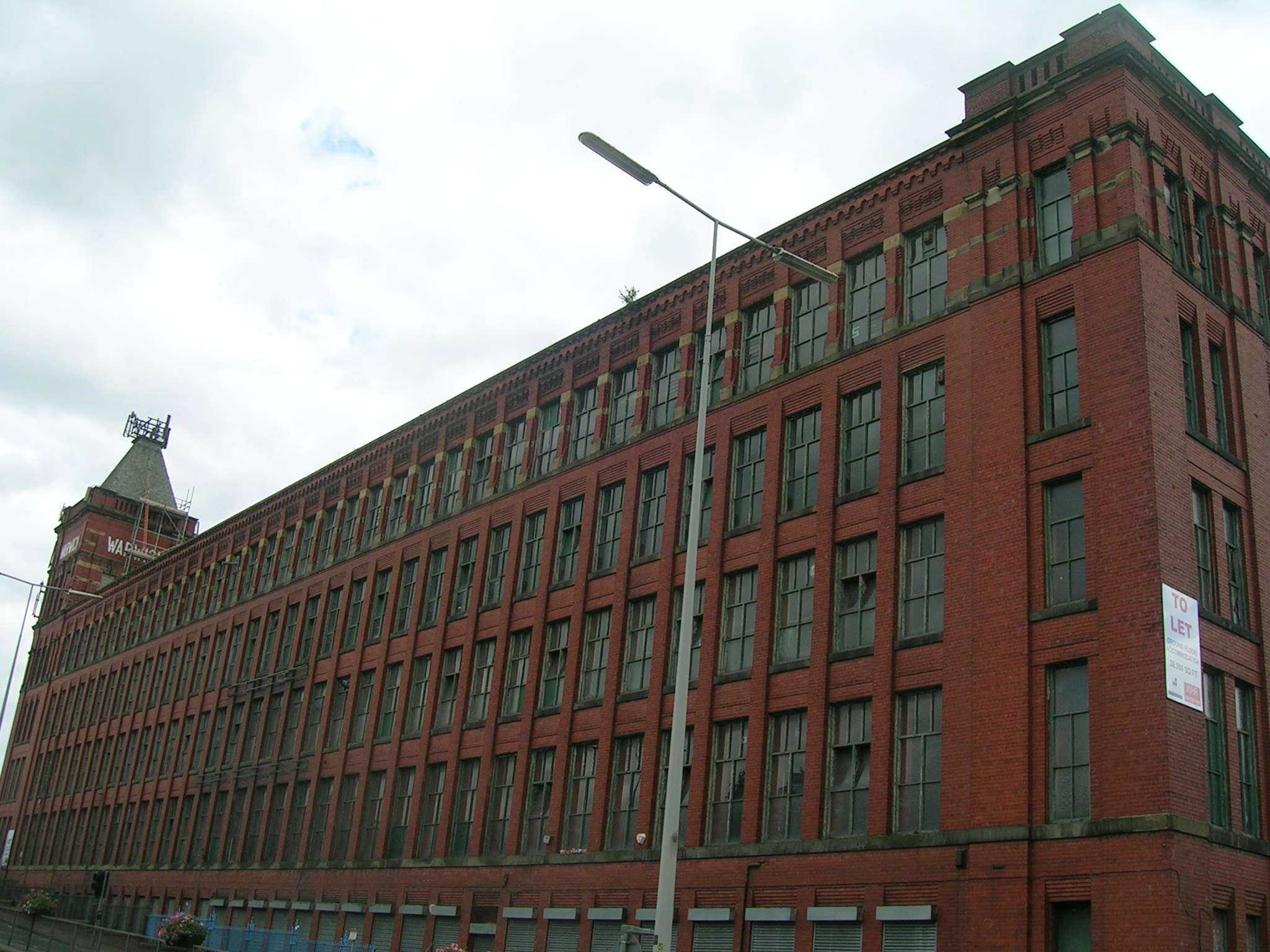
Warwick Mill is a former cotton mill in Middleton

The development of Middleton as a centre of commerce occurred during the 17th and 18th centuries, as a result of the effect of the Industrial Revolution. Additional to this, Lord Suffield obtained a Royal Charter from King George III in 1791 to hold a weekly market and three annual summer fairs in Middleton. Suffield built a market house, warehouses and shambles in the town at his own expense.

Industrial scale textile manufacture was introduced to Middleton as a result of the Industrial Revolution. It became a centre for silk production in the 18th century, which developed into a cotton spinning industry by the mid-19th century and which continued through to the mid-20th century. This transition gave rise to Middleton as a mill town.

The town's local newspaper, the Middleton Guardian has a history going back to Victorian times;copies can be found in Middleton Library of every publication since 1908.

=== 1900-present day ===
The town was linked to the national rail network until 1964, when Middleton and Middleton Junction stations were closed as part of the Beeching Axe.

== Governance ==
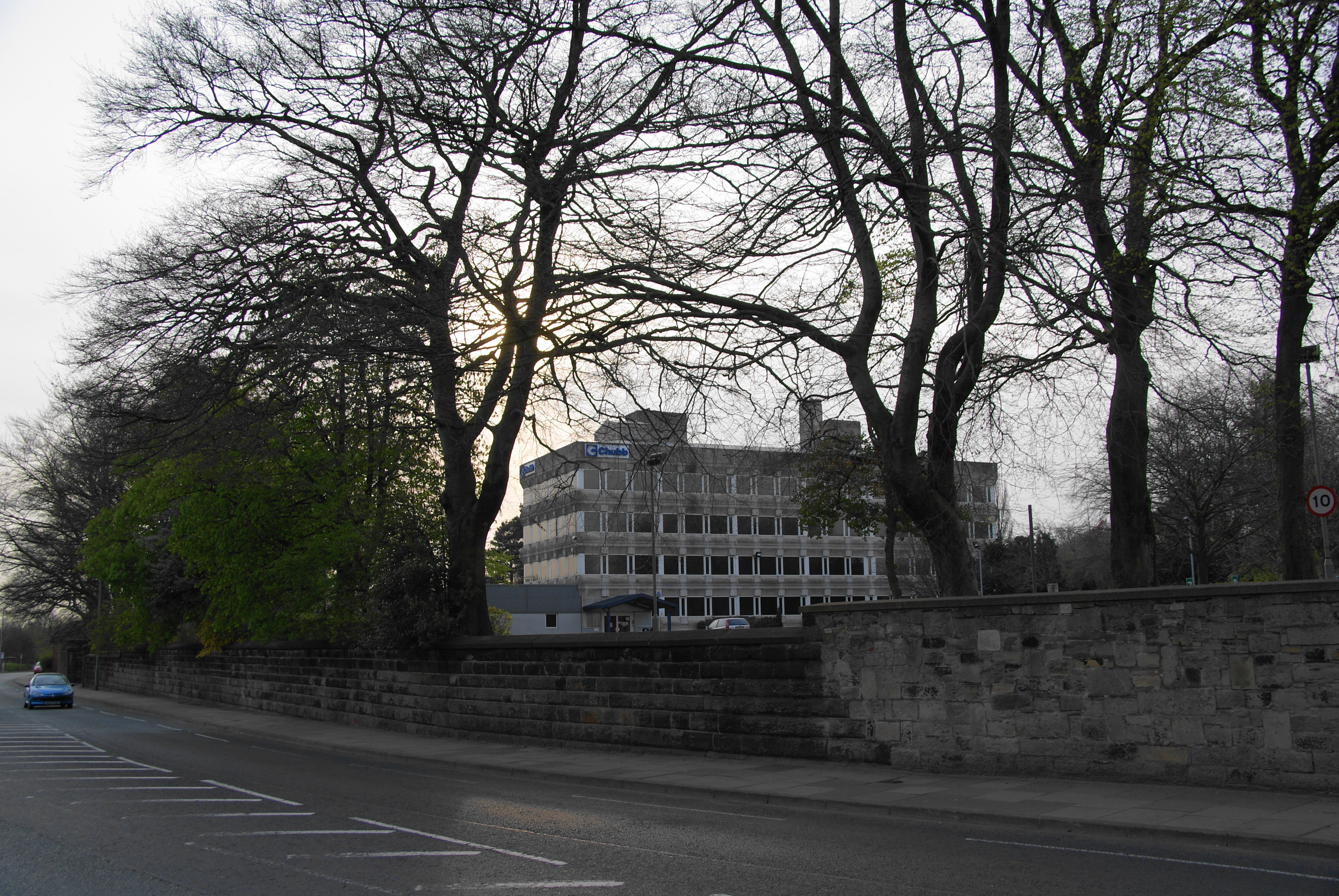
Parkfield House

The coat of arms of the former Middleton Municipal Borough Council, granted by the College of Arms on 28 January 1887; the motto Fortis in Arduis is Latin for "Strength in difficulties"

Lying within the historic county boundaries of Lancashire from the early 12th century, Middleton was once an ecclesiastical parish of the hundred of Salford and in Oldham poor law union.

In 1861, commissioners were established for the improvement of Middleton and Tonge townships or civil parishes. In 1878, the township of Alkrington and parts of the townships of Hopwood and Thornham were added to the area of the commissioners. In 1886, following the Local Government Act 1894, this territory was incorporated as the Municipal Borough of Middleton, a local government district in the administrative county of Lancashire. The borough council was based at Parkfield House. Parts of Great Heaton and Little Heaton townships were added to the borough. In 1933, there were exchanges of territory between the borough of Middleton, the City of Manchester and Chadderton Urban District. In the same year, parts of Unsworth were amalgamated with Middleton, whilst part of it was moved to Royton Urban District.

The Redcliffe-Maud Report proposed that Middleton become part of a new Metropolitan Borough of Oldham; however, following the Local Government Act 1972, the Municipal Borough of Middleton was abolished and its territory became part of the Metropolitan Borough of Rochdale, within the metropolitan county of Greater Manchester.

The Middleton parliamentary constituency was created by the Redistribution of Seats Act 1885. It was abolished in 1918, when Middleton became part of the Middleton and Prestwich constituency.

Today, Middleton forms part of the Heywood and Middleton and Blackley and Middleton South parliamentary constituencies, represented in the House of Commons by Elsie Blundell and Graham Stringer respectively, both of the Labour Party.

== Geography ==
Middleton lies on undulated land immediately north of Manchester; the towns of Chadderton and Royton are close to the east. The town of Rochdale lies to the north-north-east. The town's name is derived from Middle-town, from its situation midway between Manchester and Rochdale. It is situated on an ancient road between those places. Middleton town centre is around 220 feet (67 m) above sea level.

Middleton experiences a temperate maritime climate, like much of the British Isles, with relatively cool summers and mild winters. There is regular but generally light precipitation throughout the year. Middleton is watered by two confluent streams which have their rise in the immediate district, Wince Brook and Whit Brook, as well as the River Irk, which flows along the southern side of the town centre.

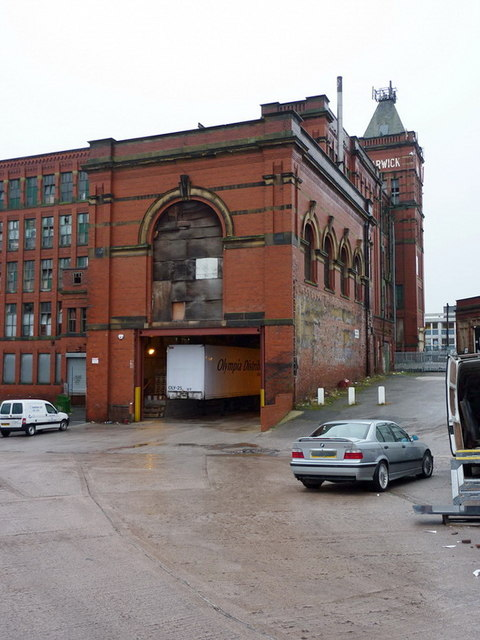
Engine house at the now derelict Warwick Mill

Much of Middleton's built environment is characterised by its 19th-century red-brick terraced houses, the infrastructure that was built to support these and the town's former cotton mills, although from the middle of the 20th century the town saw the growth of its outlying residential areas of Langley, Hollin and Boarshaw which are predominately ex-local authority housing. The skyline is marked by St. Leonard's Church. The urban structure of Middleton is regular in comparison to most towns in England. Residential dwellings and streets are located around the town centre.

There is a mixture of high-density urban areas, suburbs, and semi-rural locations in Middleton, but overwhelmingly the land use in the town is urban. The territory of Middleton is contiguous with other urban areas on its southern and eastern sides, and for purposes of the Office for National Statistics, forms part of the Greater Manchester Urban Area, the United Kingdom's third largest conurbation.

Varyingly agreed divisions and suburbs of Middleton include Alkrington, Birch, Bowlee, Boarshaw, Cheapside, Greengate, Hebers, Hollin, Hopwood, Jumbo, Langley, Moorclose, Rhodes, Stake Hill, Middleton Junction, Thornham and Tonge. Mills Hill is an area shared between Middleton and Chadderton.

Langley in the north of the town was one of Manchester City Council's overspill estates, whilst Alkrington in the south is a suburban area.

== Economy ==
Middleton's town centre is mostly commercial, with Tesco and Middleton Arndale occupying the majority of the town centre. Middleton Gardens also contains many businesses and pubs.

Industrial polymer, thermoplastics and nonwovens producer The Vita Group have a registered office in Middleton. Kitbag operates a distribution centre from Greengate.

Bluebird Bus and Coach was a travel company based in Middleton. Bus company JP Travel was also based in Middleton.

Robert McBride, a household and personal care product manufacturer, is also based in the town.

JW Lees houses its brewery at Middleton Junction; the brewery owns several pubs in Greater Manchester area.

== Landmarks ==
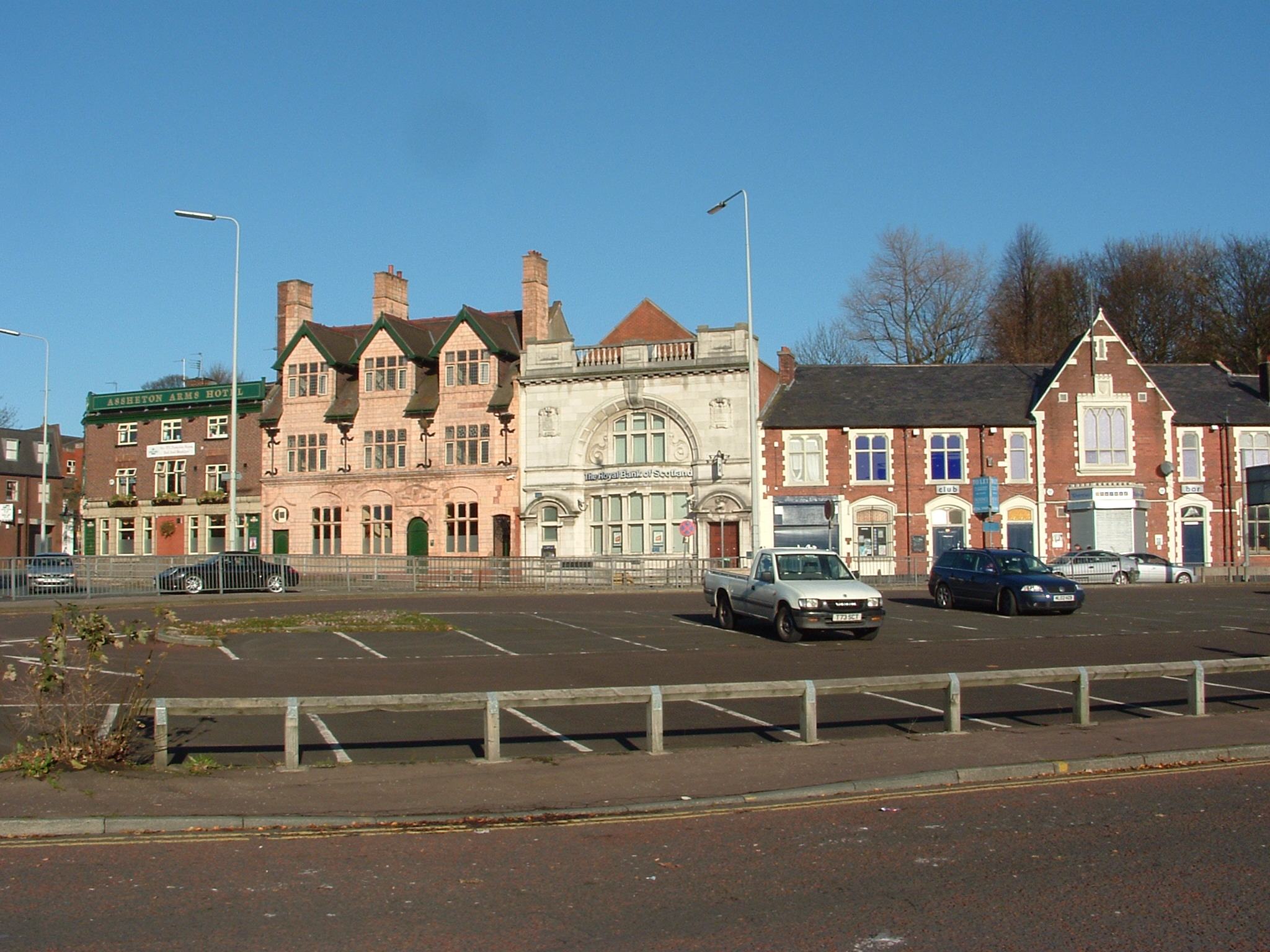
A row of buildings in Middleton's town centre, including one (second from the left) by locally-born architect Edgar Wood

The Old Grammar School

Several of Middleton's buildings were designed by Edgar Wood, a local-born influential architect of his day. Several in Middleton are landmarks and are notable.

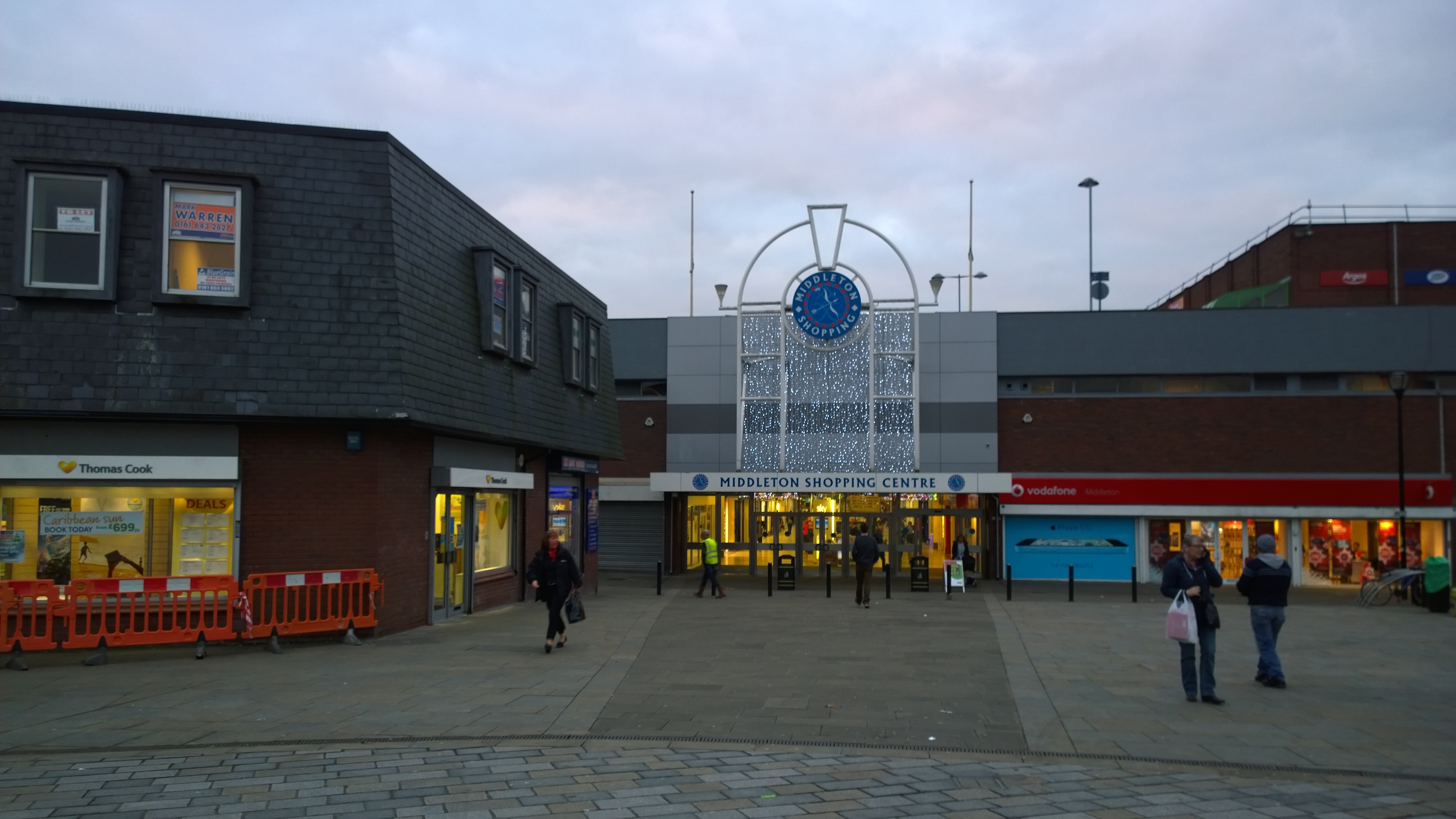
Entrance to the Middleton Arndale

In the early 1970s, The Arndale Property Trust cleared land adjacent to Middleton Gardens to build an American-style modern shopping precinct. The Middleton Arndale Centre commenced trading in 1971, although it was officially opened by the Duchess of Kent in March 1972.

=== St Leonard's Church ===
The Parish Church of St Leonard was completed in 1524, incorporating two stone arches made of stonework from an earlier Norman church. A wooden Saxon church is believed to have occupied the site long before the Norman church was built, in about 1100.

The present church was built by Sir Richard Assheton, in celebration of the knighthood granted to him by Henry VIII for his part in the Battle of Flodden, the largest battle ever fought between England and Scotland. The Flodden Window, in the sanctuary, is thought to be the oldest war memorial in the UK. It memorialises on it the names of the Middleton archers who fought at Flodden Field in 1513. The church also has one of the finest collections of monumental brasses in the area, including the only brass in the UK of an English Civil War officer in full armour, Major-General Sir Ralph Assheton.

The church was designated a grade I listed building in 1957. Middleton Archaeological Society (MAS) have been investigating Clarke Brow, a public field next to St Leonard's Square, and carried out its first dig there in August and September 2013. An account of the Society's research can be found on their website

=== Tonge Hall ===
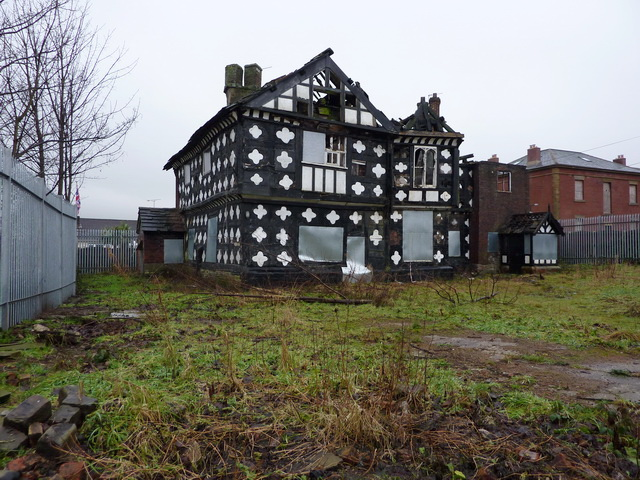
Tonge Hall

Tonge Hall is a grade II* listed Tudor structure badly damaged by an arson attack in 2007. Rochdale Council are now (2012) in the process of buying the property from the owner for a nominal sum with a view to restoration. The North West Building Preservation Trust, a registered charity, is likely to take over its long term maintenance.

MAS undertook research into Tonge and Tonge Hall. The first of these investigations took place in August 2012 and work is ongoing.

As of 2019, the building still stands derelict, surrounded by supporting scaffolding. No work has been undertaken on restoration since the arson attack.

=== Alkrington Hall ===
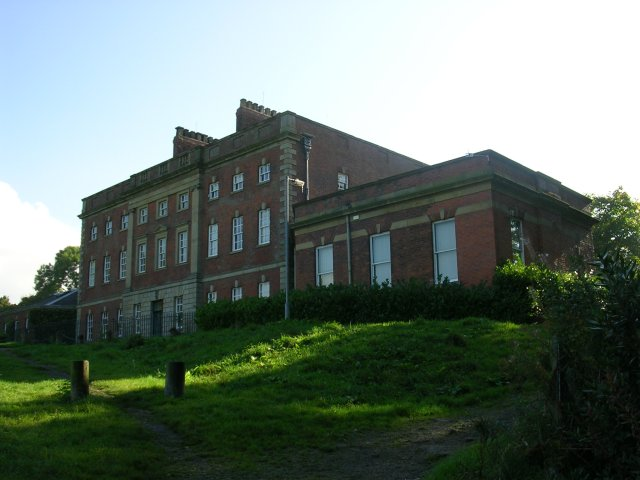
Alkrington Hall

Alkrington Hall was built in 1736 and was the seat of the Lever family. Its dominant position on a wooded hillside, looks out over the Irk Valley towards Middleton and is a grade II* listed building. Some of the original parkland around the hall has now been developed into high end housing, while the rest is a local nature reserve, Alkrington Wood.

=== Ye Olde Boar's Head ===
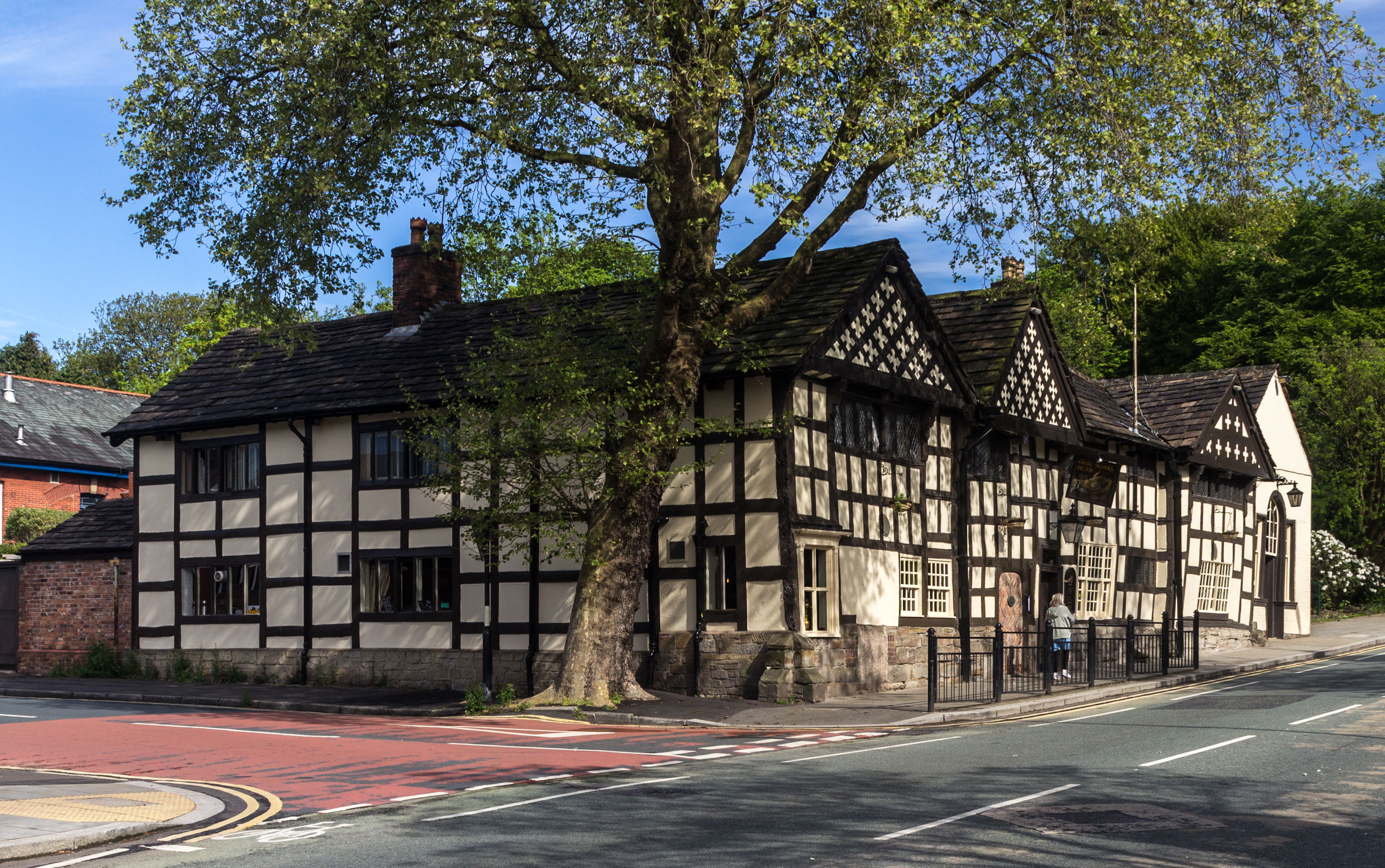
The Olde Boar’s Head

Situated below the parish church, on Long Street, Ye Olde Boar's Head was originally a coaching inn on the road between Chester and York. It is said to date from at least 1632, with parts of it date back to the 1500s. It is a grade II* listed building.

=== Warwick Mill ===
Warwick Mill, as viewed from Oldham Road

Warwick Mill is situated on Oldham Road, opposite the Middleton office of the Greater Manchester Police. Warwick Mill was a cotton mill built in 1907, with five machine floors within. It is a grade II listed building and, as of 2026, sits derelict.

=== Lodge Mill ===
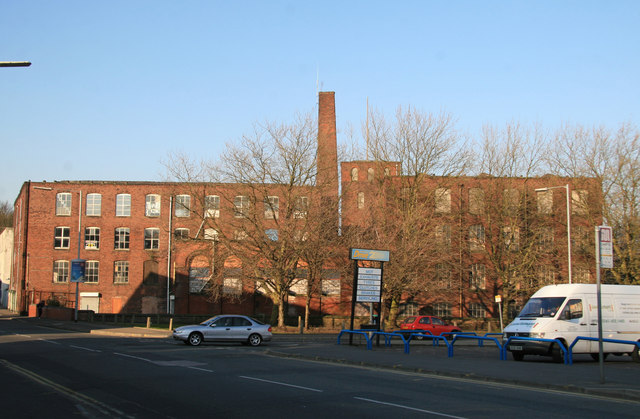
Lodge Mill as seen from Townley Street

Lodge Mill is reputedly Middleton's oldest surviving mill. Situated opposite to the old substation, the building dates back to 1839, and was a silk and cotton mill. A fire on 30 December 2021 damaged the back mill; further damage was caused to the front mill when, during demolition of the back mill, the back of the engine house for the front mill was accidentally demolished. The front mill is currently occupied by a local ice cream parlour.

The mill was damaged by a fire on 30 December 2021, and again on 29 March 2026.

== Education ==
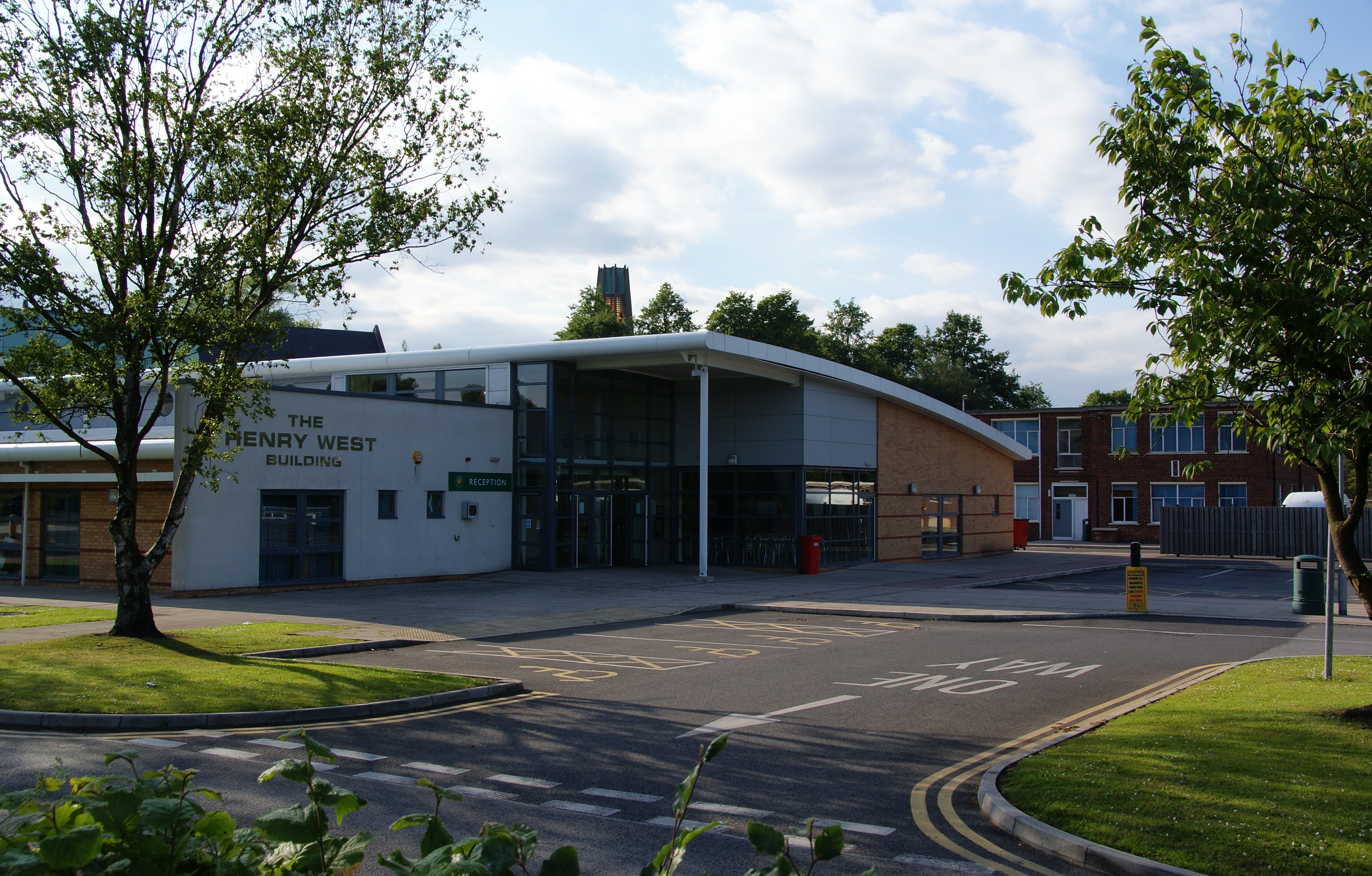
Hopwood Hall College

Almost every part of Middleton is served by a school of some kind, some with religious affiliations. According to the Office for Standards in Education, schools within the town perform at mixed levels.

Primary schools include St. Peter's Roman Catholic, Alkrington, St. Michael's CofE, St. Thomas-More's Roman Catholic Primary School, Bowlee Park Community and Middleton Parish School.

Cardinal Langley Roman Catholic High School, formerly Cardinal Langley Grammar School, is one of the local secondary schools; others are Dixons Middleton Academy (formerly Middleton Technology School), the Edgar Wood Academy and St. Anne's Academy.

Further education is provided by the sixth form at Cardinal Langley, as well as the Middleton campus of Hopwood Hall College. From 1946 to 1989, the campus was used by the De La Salle Catholic college of higher education affiliated to the Victoria University of Manchester. Founded as a teacher training college, the chapel, designed by Frederick Gibberd, was the architectural prototype for the Liverpool Metropolitan Cathedral. The chapel still exists on the campus, known as the Milnrow building, but its spire is no longer topped with a cross. Hopwood Hall College benefits from its extensive grounds and leisure facilities which were developed over many years by the De La Salle College.

== Transport ==
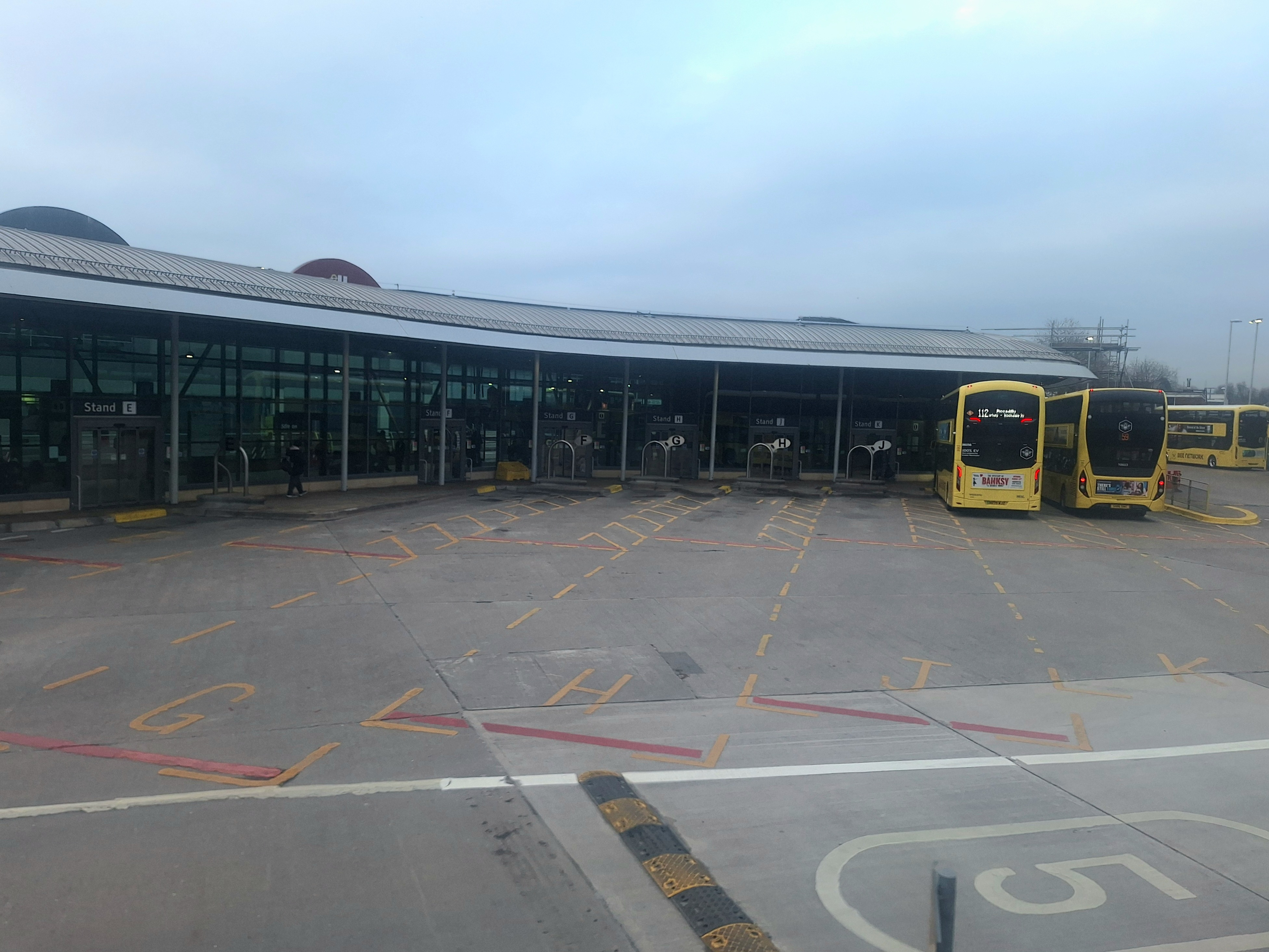
Middleton bus station

The majority of services in Middleton are operated by the Bee Network, serving destinations across Bury, Oldham, Rochdale and Manchester. In 2005, the new Middleton bus station was opened to next to the shopping centre. The station, with 13 stands, cost £4.5 million; its predecessor dated to the 1970s.

Middleton is located close to junction 19 of the M62 motorway which passes to the north. The M60 passes to the south of the town, which is accessed at junction 21 in Rhodes.

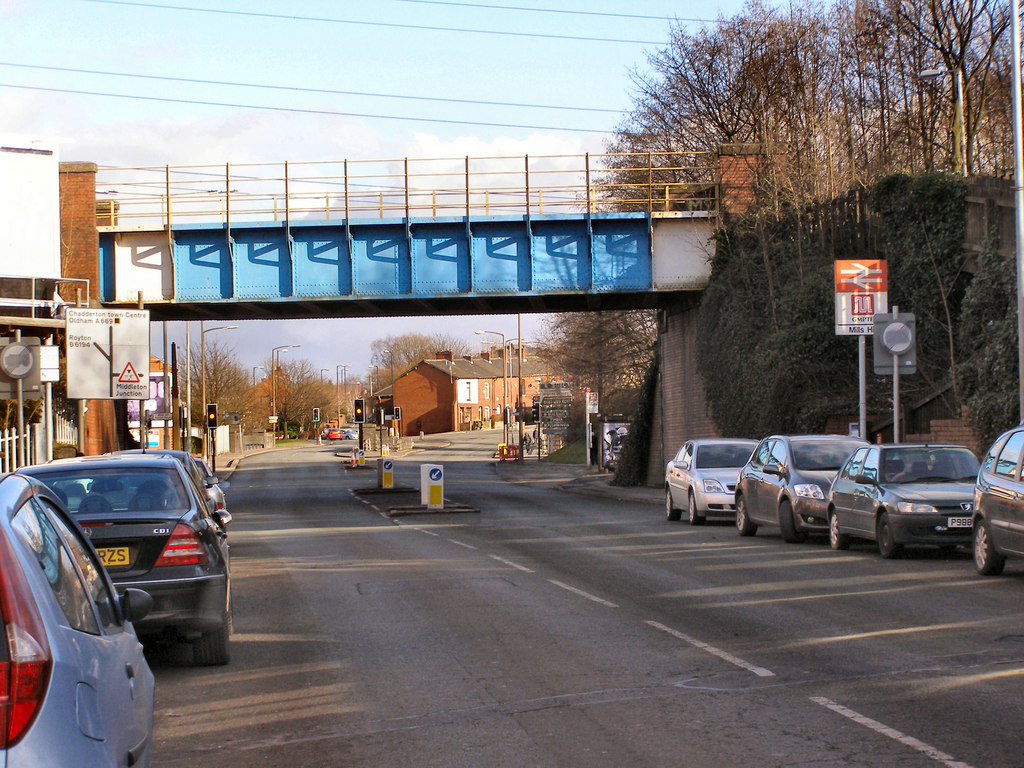
Bridge over A669 at Mills Hill station

Mills Hill railway station lies 1 mile (1.6 km) east of the town centre, on the Caldervale Line. Northern Trains operates direct services to Rochdale, Manchester Victoria, Bolton, Wigan Wallgate and Leeds.

In May 2021, the Mayor of Greater Manchester asked Transport for Greater Manchester to bring forward a business case for extending the Metrolink tram system to Middleton, as part of a wider regeneration scheme.

== Sport ==
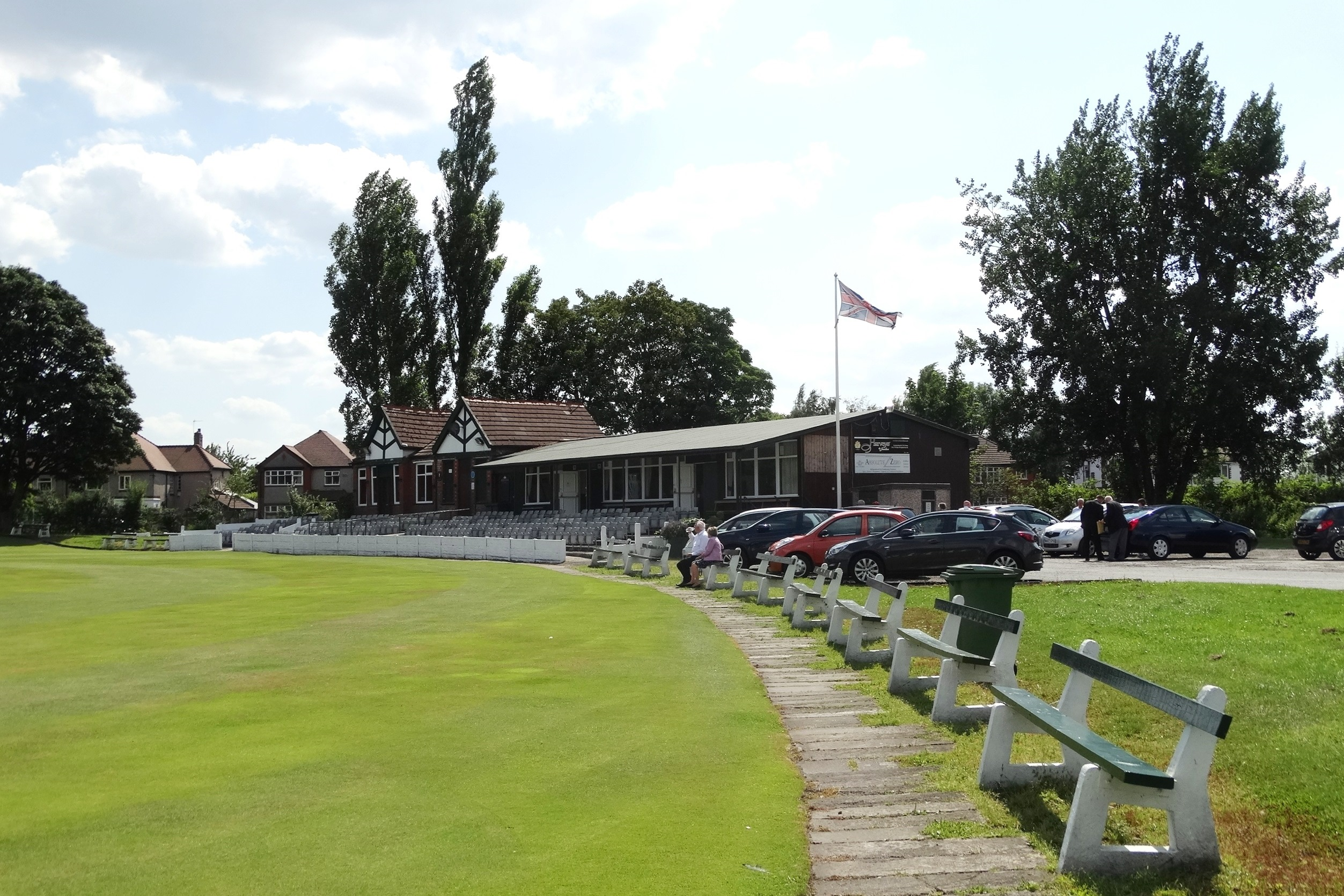
The pavilion at Middleton Cricket Club, Hollin Lane

Middleton Cricket Club play in the Lancashire League (cricket). Four golf clubs are within easy reach of the town centre: North Manchester Golf Glub, the Manchester Golf Club (at Slattocks), Heaton Park Golf Club and Blackley Golf Club. The town had a football club, Middleton F.C. from 1878 to 1902.

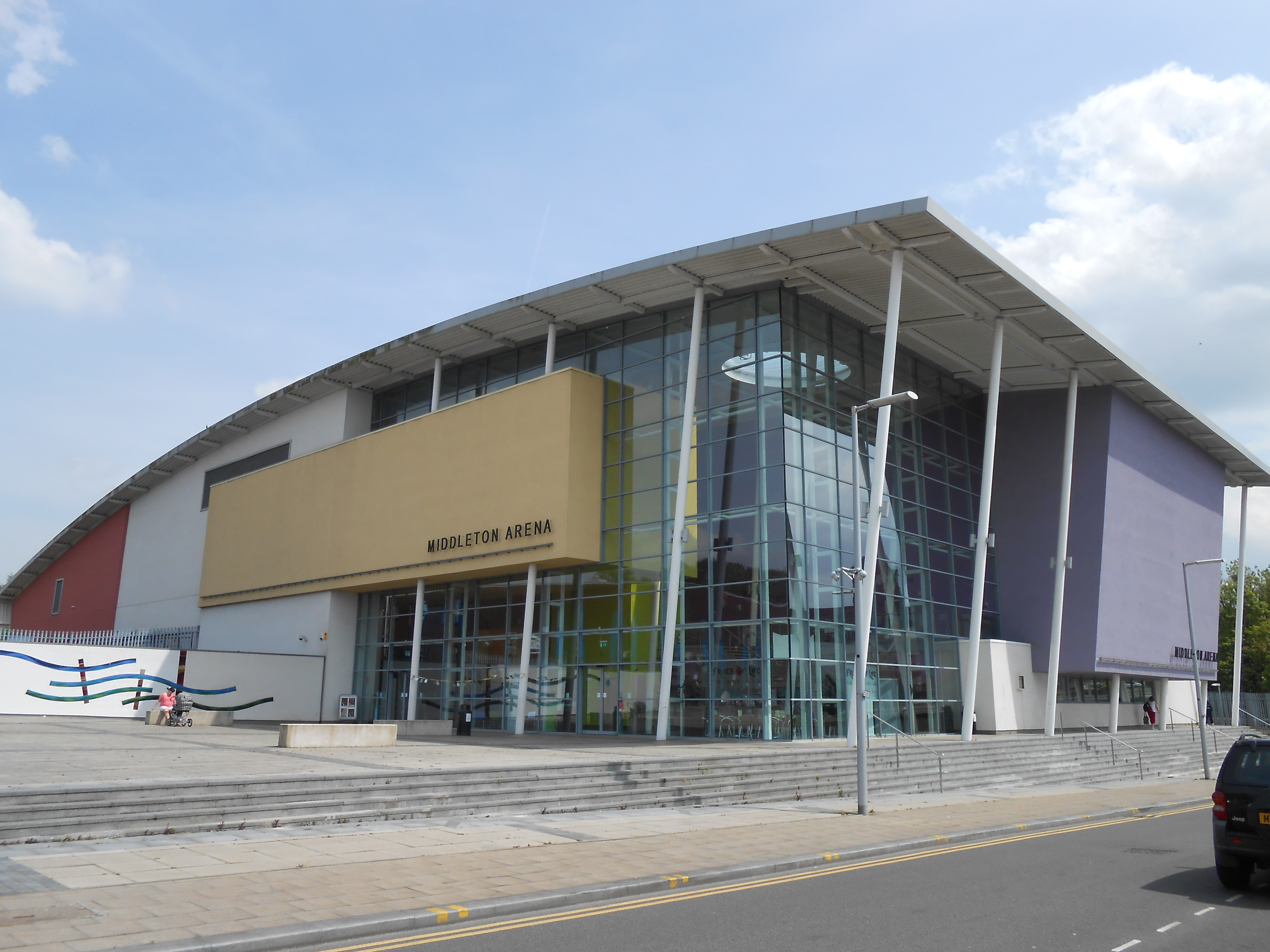
Middleton Arena

In January 2009, Middleton saw the opening of a new £13 million sports and leisure venue in the town centre. The Middleton Arena is a joint venture by Rochdale Metropolitan Borough Council and supermarket chain Tesco. The facility has replaced the old Middleton Civic Centre and Middleton Leisure Centre, allowing the site formerly occupied by these buildings to be cleared for further development into a supermarket. This resulted in the opening of a large Tesco Extra supermarket in July 2013.

Middleton is also home to Rochdale Triathlon Club. The Hopwood Hall College offers a gym both to its students and members of the general public.

== In popular culture ==
A car chase scene of the 2001 British-made Samuel L. Jackson film The 51st State was filmed on a stretch of the M60 motorway, which runs alongside Rhodes and through Alkrington, just outside the centre of the town.

== Notable people ==
Middleton has been the birthplace and home to notable people, of national and international acclaim:

- Thomas Langley (ca.1363–1437) who served as Bishop of Durham, Cardinal of the Catholic Church, Lord chancellor of England and as England's first de facto foreign secretary
- William Holt (1545–1599) from Ashworth was an English Jesuit and conspirator, who organised several unsuccessful plots to assassinate Elizabeth I
- Samuel Bamford (1788–1872), was a radical writer and politician; he led the Middleton contingent to the meeting at St Peter's Fields in August 1819, pressing for parliamentary reform, which ended in the Peterloo Massacre
- Joel Halliwell (1881–1958) was an English recipient of the Victoria Cross in World War I. Lee Rigby, (1987–2013), British soldier and victim of the 2013 Woolwich attack, was from Middleton. Pacifist, Fred Haslam (1897-1979), was born in Middleton and emigrated to Canada in 1921
- Steve Coogan (born 1965),
- John Richmond (born 1960)
- Clint Boon (born 1959) of rock band Inspiral Carpets
- Maartin Allcock (1957–2018), of rock bands Fairport Convention and Jethro Tull
- Brendan (born 1970) and Martin Coogan (born 1960), all attended the local Cardinal Langley Grammar School, later known as Cardinal Langley Roman Catholic High School
- Bernard Manning (1930–2007), Manchester-born (Ancoats) comedian, lived in Alkrington.
- Hip-hop/electro music producer Louis Gibzen (born 1991) attended Middleton Technology School
- BBC Radio 1Xtra's DJ Semtex is also from the town
- All four members of the indie-rock group The Courteeners are also from the area, including frontman Liam Fray (born 1985)
- The Chameleons, a post-punk band, was formed locally in 1981 and was described by the Middleton Guardian as "Middleton's most famous export"
- Sally Dynevor (born 1963), an actress in the Manchester-based soap opera Coronation Street
- John Richmond (born 1960), fashion designer, now based in Italy
- Saira Choudhry (born 1982) actress, she portrayed Anita Roy in Hollyoaks
- Christopher Hampson (born 1973), ballet choreographer and former ballet dancer; CEO and artistic director of Scottish Ballet since 2015.

Notable sporting figures include:

- Manchester City football player Tommy Booth, (born 1949)
- Paul Scholes (born 1974) who played for Manchester United and England
- Mark Allott (born 1977) was an Oldham Athletic midfielder, he was educated at Cardinal Langley Roman Catholic High School
- Frank (Typhoon) Tyson (1930–2015), test cricketer from the late 1950s, attended Queen Elizabeth's Grammar school
- Norma Ball, wife of Bobby Charlton, also attended Queen Elizabeth's Grammar school; she married Bobby at St Gabriel's church in Middleton in 1961
- The South African-born 2008 Summer Olympics silver medallist swimmer Keri-Anne Payne (born 1987), attended Cardinal Langley Roman Catholic High School.

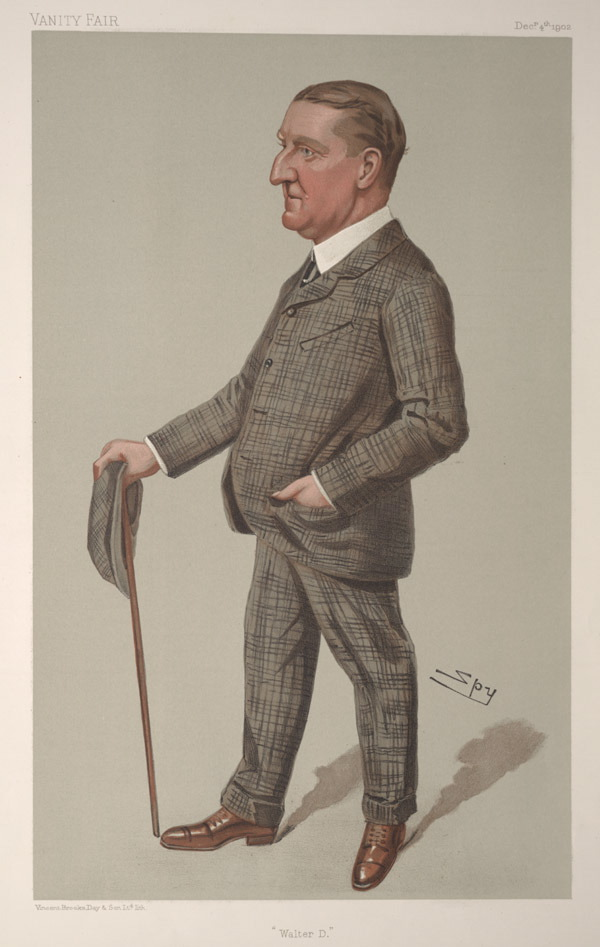
Caricature of Walter Durnford in Vanity Fair, 1902

- Thomas Jones (c. 1550 – 1619), Archbishop of Dublin and Lord Chancellor of Ireland.
- Ralph Assheton (1596–1650), soldier and politician, sat in the House of Commons from 1640 to 1649.
- William Assheton (1641–1711), cleric, a prolific writer and life assurance pioneer.
- Sir Ralph Assheton, 2nd Baronet (1651–1716), landowner and politician, sat in the House of Commons, 1677/79 & 1694/98.
- Ashton Lever (1729–1788), from Alkrington Hall, collected of natural objects, in particular the eponymous Leverian collection of fossils and shells.
- Charles Burton (1793–1866), clergyman and writer from Rhodes Hall.
- Walter Durnford (1847–1926), an English academic, on the staff of Eton College from 1870 to 1899.
- Arthur Wolstenholme (1889–1958), footballer who played over 340 games
- Dame Pamela Sarah Coward (born ca.1944), educator who transformed her school, Middleton Technology School
- Paul S. Walsh (born 1955), businessman who is the executive chairman of the McLaren Group, and was the chief executive of Diageo, the whisky company, between 2000 and 2013.
- Graham Bell (born 1955), footballer, played over 450 games, including 170 for Oldham Athletic & 143 for Preston North End
- Kenny Clements (born 1955), footballer who played 540 games including 225 for Manchester City and 206 for Oldham Athletic
- Ashley Ward (born 1970), footballer who played 388 games

== See also ==
- Listed buildings in Middleton, Greater Manchester
