= Reem Alasadi =

Iraqi-born British fashion designer

- Occupation: Fashion designer
- Label: Reem

Reem Alasadi (Arabic: ريم الأسدي) is an Iraqi-born British fashion designer. She is based in London and Tokyo, has gained popularity in Japan, with her style being described as "British punk and recycled materials molded into voluminous and voluptuous Victorian-inspired dresses".

== Early life and career ==
Alasadi was born in Iraq and moved to England at age 8, where her family settled in Maidstone, Kent. By age 16, she was working for Karen Millen in Kent.

Alasadi was accepted to London College of Fashion and Central Saint Martins College of Art and Design, and by the age of 21, she had set up her first label and a 1,000 sq ft (93 m^{2}) studio.

At the start of her career, Reem had sold vintage clothing in Notting Hill. Her stall was at the Portobello Road market, where she would practice her flair for displaying classic pieces restyled, thus widening the appeal of the garment to more than just collectors of vintage fashion. Reem is renowned for her wildly eclectic style, which has incorporated a growing underground reputation. She has worked with several British designers such as John Richmond, Robert Cary-Williams, and Stella McCartney.

In 2003, she opened her own vintage shop, and has collaborated with Laforet, a department store in Harajuku as part of Tokyo Fashion Week since 2005.

In 2007, she entered the London Fashion Week arena with a show entitled Beautiful Agony as part of ON||OFF.

She won an award for Best Show at Japan Fashion Week, where she launched her ready-to-wear line, a collection including colors such as: deep inky blues, burnt siennas, and lacey whites.

More recently, Alasadi is a principal teaching fellow and a leader of various MA programs at the University of Southampton's Winchester School of Art.
