= Middleton Technology School =

Location
- Kenyon Lane; Middleton, Greater Manchester, M24 2GT; England
- 53°32′53″N 2°10′54″W

Information
- Type: Academy
- Motto: "Practice Makes Permanent!" -J. Boyle 2020
- Local authority: Rochdale
- Trust: Dixons
- Department for Education URN: 105842 Tables
- Ofsted: Reports
- Headteacher: Janine Kellett
- Gender: Coeducational
- Age: 11 to 16
- Enrolment: 1,341
- Website: http://www.middtech.com/

Middleton Technology School is a coeducational secondary school in the Middleton area of the Metropolitan Borough of Rochdale in Greater Manchester, England. Since 1995 the school has specialised in technology, vocational education and Raising Achievement Transforming Learning (RATL). During a 2006 Ofsted inspection the school was described as "Outstanding".

== History ==
The school was awarded specialist status as a Technology College in 1995, the first school in North West England to do so.

As a result of the British Governments Building Schools for the Future (BSF) programme, Middleton Technology School received £9million to build new and improved facilities. This includes the construction of a new technology block to house specialist science, technology, engineering and mathematics classrooms. Work also includes rebuilding the remainder of the school, and is expected to the completed in late 2012. The school had planned to gain academy status, but was forced to abandon this as the school would be liable for £2million VAT payment from the BSF project.

In October 2012, Rochdale Metropolitan Borough Council launched a consultation on the possible closure of the school sixth form. Reasons given for the closure of the sixth form include the relatively small size of the sixth form, falling student numbers, and the alternative sixth form provision offered by Rochdale Sixth Form College which opened in 2010. If the proposal is enacted, the school will not offer any new sixth form courses for students in September 2013, however existing sixth form students at the school will be able to complete their studies without relocating to another institution.

Previously a community school administered by rochdale Metropolitan Borough Council, in September 2016 Middleton Technology School converted to academy status. The school is now sponsored by the Great Academies Education Trust. In March 2026 it was renamed to Dixon Middleton Academy after dixons is became the sponsor

== Notable former pupils ==
- Gold-selling music producer Louis Gibzen attended the school between 2002 and 2007.
- Former Manchester United football player David May (footballer).
