= Hopwood Hall College =

Location
- College Road; Rochdale, Greater Manchester, OL12 6HY; United Kingdom

Information
- Established: 17 July 1992
- Local authority: Rochdale
- Department for Education URN: 130507 Tables
- Ofsted: Reports
- Principal: Julia Heap
- Gender: Mixed
- Age: 16+
- Website: http://www.hopwood.ac.uk/

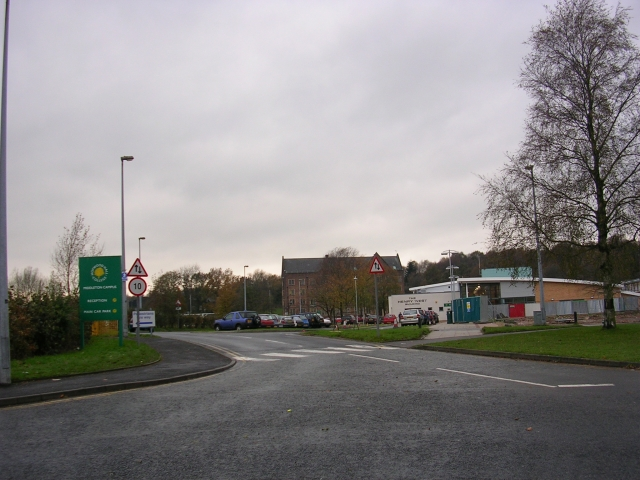

Hopwood Hall College is a further education college in the Metropolitan Borough of Rochdale, Greater Manchester, England. It has two campuses, one in Rochdale (53.6168°N 2.1626°W) and one in Middleton (53.5690°N 2.1889°W). The college offers a wide range of vocational and technical study programmes aimed at young people aged 16–19, with some university level courses, Apprenticeship programmes and adult education.

== History ==
Hopwood Hall College was incorporated in 1992 and officially opened by Queen Elizabeth II on 17 July 1992. The college operates from two campuses in Rochdale and Middleton. The Rochdale campus was formerly home to Rochdale College of Further Education, Rochdale College of Art and Rochdale Technology College, all of which merged when the college was incorporated. The Middleton campus prior to incorporation was home to the De La Salle College of Higher Education, an affiliated college of The University of Manchester.

Since its opening, Hopwood Hall College has provided A Level courses for sixth form students from the local area. However, since Rochdale Sixth Form College opened in September 2010, the college discontinued A Level provision concentrating on vocational further education for school leavers, Apprenticeships and courses for adult learners.

A series of capital projects have been undertaken and completed since incorporation. A Sports Arena was opened on 25 September 2002 by Ivan Lewis, Parliamentary Under-Secretary of State for Learning and Skills, and Paul Scholes of Manchester United Football Club. The Henry West Building at the Middleton campus was officially opened on 26 May 2006 by college governor Henry West. On 6 April 2006, Lord Tom Pendry, President of The Football Foundation, opened the Football Pavilion and Astroturf football pitch at the Middleton campus. A £7.5m scheme to construct a purpose-built technology centre at the Middleton campus was completed in October 2011 and officially opened on 6 March 2012 by John Hayes, Minister of State for Further Education, Skills and Lifelong Learning.
