= Alkrington =

Area of Greater Manchester, England

Coordinates: 53.5372°N 2.1878°W

Alkrington Garden Village
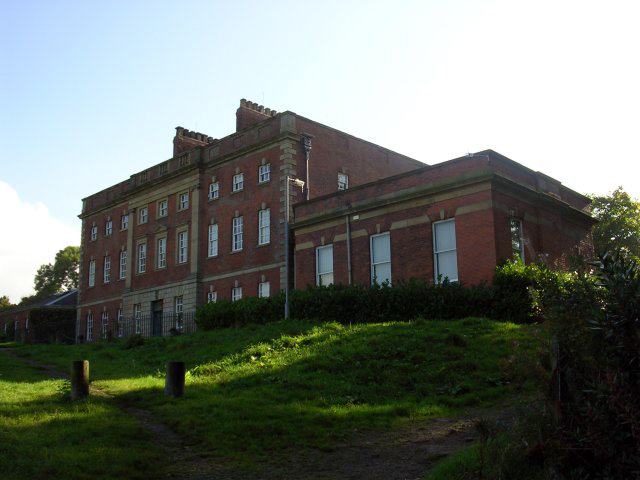
- Alkrington Hall

- Location within Greater Manchester
- OS grid reference: SD875045
- Metropolitan borough: Rochdale
- Metropolitan county: Greater Manchester
- Region: North West
- Country: England
- Sovereign state: United Kingdom
- Post town: MANCHESTER
- Postcode district: M24
- Dialling code: 0161
- Police: Greater Manchester
- Fire: Greater Manchester
- Ambulance: North West
- UK Parliament: Blackley and Middleton south

Alkrington Garden Village is a suburban area of Middleton, in the Metropolitan Borough of Rochdale, Greater Manchester, England.

Alkrington lies on the northern edge of the city of Manchester, with the suburb of Blackley directly to the south. The Local Government Act 1972 added Alkrington to the Metropolitan Borough of Rochdale; though Alkrington is separated from the town of Rochdale by the rest of Middleton and rural land.

The "Woodside" district of Alkrington is home to a number of affluent properties with Woodfield Road, Middleton's most expensive street, being located here.

== History ==
In 1212 the manor of Alkrington, consisting of four oxgangs of land, was held by Adam de Prestwich from the Montbegon fee. About 20 years later it passed to the de Lacys, and subsequently to the Crown; but the manor continued to descend with the Prestwich family. In 1561 Sir Robert Langley gave the manor to his daughter Katherine who was married to Thomas Legh of Lyme and it was sold by the Leghs in 1627 to Robert and John Lever. Sir Darcy Lever was High Sheriff of Lancashire in 1736. Sir Ashton Lever, who was high sheriff in 1771, collected curiosities which he exhibited at Alkrington Hall. He was succeeded by his brother whose younger son, John, lived at Alkrington until 1834 and then to Dorning Rasbotham who sold it to John Lees.

Historically a part of Lancashire, in the Middle Ages Alkrington was a township in the parish of Prestwich-cum-Oldham in the hundred of Salford. Once rolling farmland, in 1866 Alkrington became a separate civil parish, in 1886 Alkrington was added to the Municipal Borough of Middleton, and developed into a residential area. On 31 December 1894, the parish was abolished and merged with Middleton. In 1891 the parish had a population of 446.

=== Alkrington Hall ===
The Grade II* listed Alkrington Hall was converted into flats, however, it is now two separate dwellings. It was built between 1735–36 to the designs of Giacomo Leoni for Darcy Lever. The three-storey house is mainly brick built with ashlar dressings and tile and slate roofs. Its Classical style facade has nine bays with single-storey three-bay wings either side. The central three bays project slightly and have giant Ionic pilasters above the rusticated stone ground floor.

The woodland around Alkrington Hall comprises 125 acres (50 ha) and is a designated Local Nature Reserve, Alkrington Woods.

The remains of an earlier hall can be seen on the site. The manor of Alkrington was bought by the Lever family in the 1600s but when the last family member died childless the estate and present hall were sold. The new owners sold on most of the land and the hall came into the possession of the local council who converted it to flats. The hall was later resold into private hands and converted into four luxury homes.

== Geography ==
The area of Alkrington township was 797 acres (323 ha). The underlying geology is that of the Lancashire Coalfield. The highest ground, 350 feet (110 m) above sea level in the south-east and north east but mostly above 300 feet (91 m), slopes downwards to the boundary brooks in the south west. The main road that serves Alkrington is the A664 from Manchester via Blackley to Middleton. Junction 20 of the M60 motorway is to the south-west.

== Religion ==
There are three churches within the old township area. The Anglican Church of St Michael was founded in 1839, a Congregational church was built in 1929 and the Roman Catholic St Thomas More Church was built in 1960.

== Notable people ==
- Steve Coogan, comedian, was born and brought up in Alkrington.
- Liam Fray, lead singer of The Courteeners, was born and brought up in Alkrington.
- Brian Kidd, former Manchester United and Manchester City footballer, resides in Alkrington.
- Bernard Manning (1930–2007), comedian and nightclub owner, lived in the area for more than 20 years.
- Nedum Onuoha, former Manchester City footballer, owns a home in the area.
- Lady Mary Peters, Olympian athlete, brought up in Alkrington.
- Ashley Ward, former Manchester City footballer, was born and brought up in Alkrington.

== Transport ==
As of 2024, several bus services serve Alkrington, including:

- 17: Norden to Shudehill Interchange via Rochdale. This service is operated by Stagecoach as part of the Bee Network.
- 17A: Rochdale to Shudehill Interchange. This service is operated by Stagecoach as part of the Bee Network.
- 18: Langley to Manchester Royal Infirmary. This service is operated by Stagecoach as part of the Bee Network. Some services terminate at Shudehill Interchange instead of Manchester Royal Infirmary.
- 41: Middleton to Sale Metrolink tram stop. This service is operated by Stagecoach as part of the Bee Network. Some services terminate at North Manchester General Hospital instead of Middleton.
- 114: Boarshaw to Piccadilly Gardens. This service is operated by Stagecoach as part of the Bee Network. Most services terminate at Alkrington, Lincoln Road instead of Boarshaw.
- 115: Middleton - Moston - Harpurhey - Higher Blackley Circular. This service is operated by Stagecoach as part of the Bee Network.
- 116: Middleton - Higher Blackley - Harpurhey - Moston Circular. This service is operated by Stagecoach as part of the Bee Network.
- 159: Oldham to Middleton via Chadderton. This service is operated by Diamond Bus under the Bee Network.
- 163: Bury Interchange to Piccadilly Gardens. This service is operated by Go North West as part of the Bee Network.
- 415: Middleton to Oldham via Chadderton. This service is operated by Stagecoach as part of the Bee Network.

== See also ==
- Grade II* listed buildings in Greater Manchester
- Listed buildings in Middleton, Greater Manchester
