= Joel Halliwell =

English Victoria Cross recipient (1881–1958)

Joel Halliwell VC
- Born: 29 December 1881; Middleton, Lancashire
- Died: 14 June 1958 (aged 76); Oldham, Lancashire
- Burial place: Boarshaw New Cemetery, Middleton
- Military career
- Allegiance: United Kingdom
- Branch: British Army
- Rank: Lance-Corporal
- Units: Lancashire Fusiliers
- Conflicts: World War I
- Awards: Victoria Cross

Corporal Joel Halliwell VC (29 December 1881 – 14 June 1958) was an English recipient of the Victoria Cross, the highest and most prestigious award for gallantry in the face of the enemy that can be awarded to British and Commonwealth forces.

== Details ==
Halliwell was 37 years old, and a lance-corporal in the 11th Battalion, The Lancashire Fusiliers, British Army during the First World War when he performed a deed on 27 May 1918 at Muscourt, France, during the Third Battle of the Aisne for which he was awarded the Victoria Cross.

The citation reads;

No. 9860 L/Cpl Joel Halliwell, Lanc Fusrs. (Middleton)

For most conspicuous bravery and determination displayed during the withdrawal of the remnants of the Battalion when closely engaged with the enemy. L/Cpl Halliwell, having captured a stray enemy horse, rode out under heavy rifle fire and machine gun fire and rescued a wounded man from "No Man's Land". He repeated this performance several times, and succeeded in rescuing one officer and nine other ranks. He made another effort to reach a wounded man, but was driven back by the very close advance of the enemy. His conduct was magnificent throughout, and was a splendid and inspiring example to all who saw him.

== The medal and later history ==
For conspicuous bravery and devotion to duty, he was awarded the Victoria Cross. He died at age 76 in Greater Manchester, England. The medal is in Middleton, Greater Manchester with his family, and Joel Halliwell is buried with distinction at nearby Boarshaw Cemetery, with the inscription on his stone which reads 'For Valour'...'These Are Deeds That Should Not Pass Away, And Names That Must Not Wither'.

In 2014, Joel Haliwell and his descendents (his daughter and other relatives) featured in one of the two special World War I episodes of the BBC programme The Antiques Roadshow. Haliwell's story was recounted, and the family visited the grave of Joel's brother Tom, who had been killed in 1916.

== See also ==
- Monuments to Courage (David Harvey, 1999)
- The Register of the Victoria Cross (This England, 1997)
- VCs of the First World War (Gerald Gliddon, 1997)
