= Rochdale Sixth Form College =

Location
- College Road; Rochdale, Greater Manchester, OL12 6HY; United Kingdom; 53.6171°N 2.1637°W

Information
- Type: Sixth Form College
- Established: 1 September 2010
- Local authority: Rochdale
- Department for Education URN: 144463 Tables
- Principal: Karl Smith
- Age: 16 to 18
- Website: http://www.rochdalesfc.ac.uk

Rochdale Sixth Form College is a Sixth Form College opened in September 2010. The Sixth Form College campus is situated next to Hopwood Hall College in Rochdale, Greater Manchester, England, forming an educational quarter in the town. Rochdale is the first sixth form college to be opened in the UK since 2004, and the 93rd sixth form college in the country. The college is a member of the Sixth Form College Association (SFCA), founder of the Student Union of Celebration and Co-operation (SUCC), and the Association of Colleges (AoC).

== History ==
From the 1970s to the 1990s, most secondary schools in the Metropolitan Borough of Rochdale offered sixth form education such as A-levels to school leavers. In addition, Hopwood Hall College also offered a provision of sixth form courses to students.

By the 2000s, sixth form students studying in Rochdale Borough were achieving below the national average in terms of A Level results. As well as this, many local school leavers were opting to study sixth form education at schools or colleges outside of Rochdale borough, particularly at dedicated sixth form colleges in nearby areas such as Bury and Oldham. In a local area review of post-16 education in Rochdale in 2004, the Learning and Skills Council proposed the construction of a new sixth form college in Rochdale borough. Rochdale's MP, Paul Rowen, along with local student, Sajid Suleman, launched a campaign in 2006 for a new sixth form college in Rochdale to stop the "brain drain". After funding for the new college became available, the Department for Children, Schools and Families formally approved the construction of the new college in August 2008. The Chair of the Governing Body is Dame Pamela Coward, former headteacher of Middleton Technology School.

The £26 million new sixth form college campus was subsequently constructed next to Hopwood Hall College in Rochdale town. Rochdale Sixth Form College opened in September 2010, overseen by the Founding Principal of the college, Julian Appleyard. Appleyard served as Principal of the college for eight years, leaving his position at the end of February, 2018. Appleyard was followed by Richard Ronksley, who assumed the role of Principal near the end of 2018. Ronksley served as Principal of Rochdale Sixth Form until January 2023, when the current Principal, Karl Smith, took his position.

Rochdale Sixth Form College is now the primary provider of sixth form education in the Metropolitan Borough of Rochdale, with around 10% of students on roll from schools outside of Rochdale. Since the opening of the college, most (but not all) secondary schools in the borough have ceased to offer sixth form courses for students. Hopwood Hall College has also discontinued its provision of A-levels, concentrating instead on offering vocational further education for school leavers, as well as courses for adult learners.

== Today ==
Opened in September 2010, Rochdale Sixth Form College offers a range of A-level courses to students from Rochdale and the wider borough. Facilities at the college campus include a theatre and dance/drama studio, learning resource and study centre, ICT suites, science laboratories, a music recording studio and Mac suite, specialist art and design studios, a restaurant, a coffee house, a fitness suite and a multi-faith prayer room.

The first set of academic results by the College were in the top 5% of all sixth form institutions in the UK in value added terms. The College received national coverage for this performance. In the same year the College Principal was the key note speaker at a number of sixth form national conferences and continues to feature leading sessions on post 16 leadership at national conferences.

The College continues to make the headlines for its academic performance. The A Level results showed a 99% pass rate and value added for AS Level place it in the top 1% of sixth forms in the country. The College featured very prominently in the Department for Education League Tables in February 2013 where it was number two out of 93 sixth form colleges in the UK in terms of value added. The College had its first OFSTED inspection in March 2013 and received the result of being an outstanding college, one of only two sixth form colleges nationally to be awarded the outstanding status under the rigorous new inspection framework.

The College goes from strength to strength and now has national acclaim. The College made history in January 2017 being the first placed college for the third consecutive year in the Department for Education Performance tables for A level progress. In January 2019, the College achieved first place in the Department for Educations Performance tables for the fifth year running, and went on to win the sixth-form of the year award at the 2021 Tes FE Awards, Tes Magazine being widely considered the most trusted source of education news and views in the UK.
