= Graham Stringer =

British Labour politician (born 1950)

Graham Stringer MP
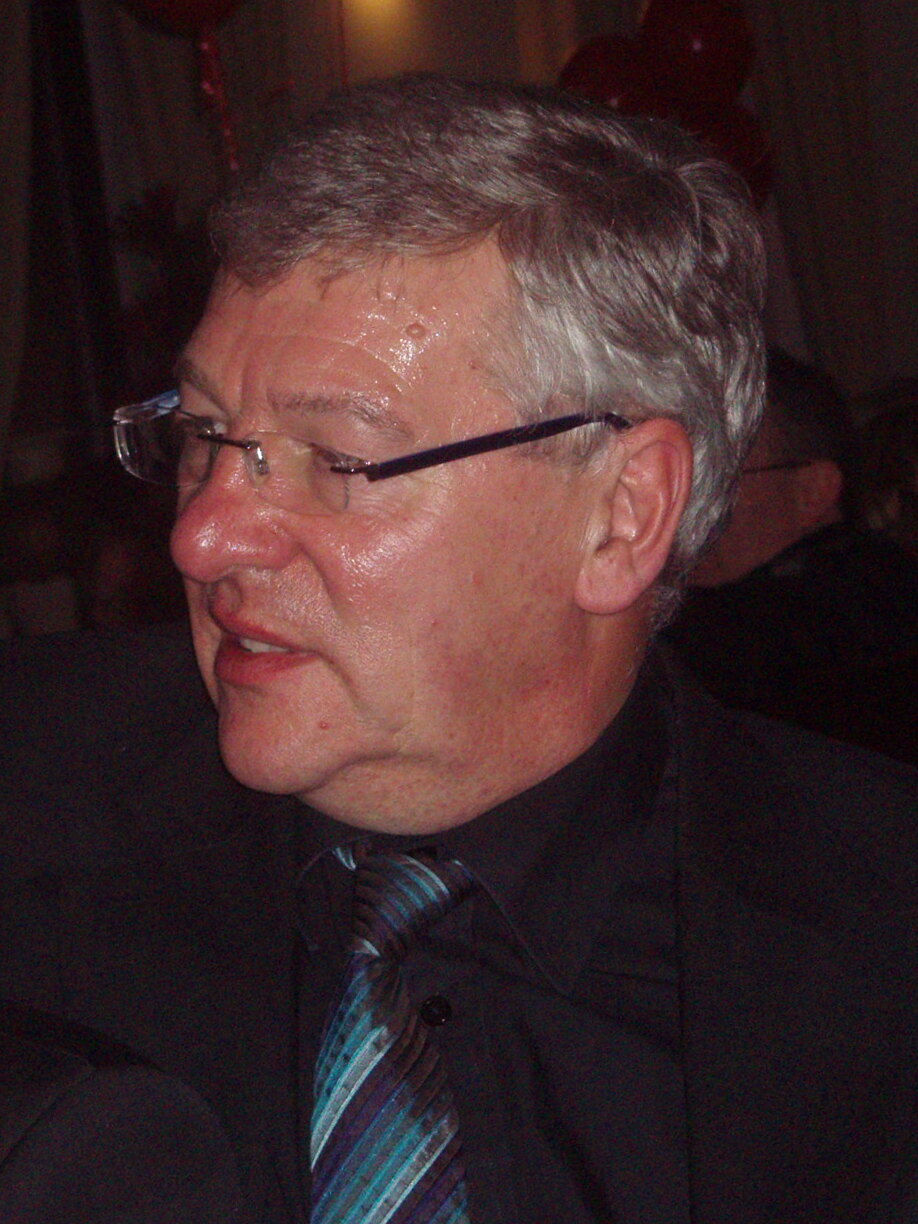
- Stringer in 2007

Lord Commissioner of the Treasury
- In office 12 June 2001 – 29 May 2002
- Prime Minister: Tony Blair

Parliamentary Secretary for the Cabinet Office
- In office 9 November 1999 – 7 June 2001
- Prime Minister: Tony Blair
- Preceded by: Office established
- Succeeded by: Chris Leslie

Member of Parliament
- Incumbent
- Assumed office 1 May 1997
- Preceded by: Ken Eastham
- Constituency: Manchester Blackley (1997–2010); Blackley and Broughton (2010–2024); Blackley and Middleton South (2024–present)
- Majority: 10,220 (32.7%)

Leader of Manchester City Council
- In office 1984–1996
- Preceded by: Bill Egerton
- Succeeded by: Richard Leese

Member of Manchester City Council
- In office 4 May 1979 – 7 May 1998
- Ward: Harpurhey (1982–1998); Charlestown (1979–1982)

Personal details
- Born: Graham Eric Stringer; 17 February 1950 (age 76) Manchester, England
- Party: Labour
- Spouse: Kathryn Carr (m. 1999)
- Children: 3
- Education: University of Sheffield (BSc)

Graham Eric Stringer (born 17 February 1950) is a British Labour politician who has served as Member of Parliament for Blackley and Middleton South since the 2024 general election. He has served as the area's MP continuously since 1997, representing the predecessor constituencies of Manchester Blackley (1997–2010), and Blackley and Broughton (2010–2024). He was a minister then whip in the first and second Blair governments respectively.

Prior to entering parliament, within local politics, he was leader of Manchester City Council from 1984 to 1996, and a city councillor from 1979 to 1998, representing Charlestown and Harpurhey. He also served as chairman of Manchester Airport from 1996 to 1997.

== Early life and career ==
Graham Stringer was born on 17 February 1950 in Manchester. He attended Christ Church Primary School in Beswick and Openshaw Technical High School for Boys in Openshaw. After graduating in chemistry from the University of Sheffield in 1971, Stringer worked as an analytical chemist in the plastics industry.

He became a local councillor in Manchester in 1979, and was Manchester City Council leader from 1984 to 1996. He was also chair of Manchester Airport from 1996 to 1997.

== Parliamentary career ==
At the 1997 general election, Stringer was elected to Parliament as MP for Manchester Blackley with 70% of the vote and a majority of 19,588.

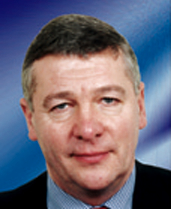
Official portrait, 2001

Stringer was a member of the Environment, Transport and Regional Affairs Select Committee until 1999. He then served as Parliamentary Secretary for the Cabinet Office until 2001. He is a member of Labour Friends of Israel.

At the 2001 general election, Stringer was re-elected as MP for Manchester Blackley with a decreased vote share of 68.9% and a decreased majority of 14,464. He was again re-elected at the 2005 general election with a decreased vote share of 62.3% and a decreased majority of 12,027.

Following a spell on the back benches and as a government whip, he spent the last six years of the Labour Government as a member of the Transport Select Committee. He campaigned against a proposed Congestion Charge in Greater Manchester.

In September 2008, Stringer became the first Labour MP to publicly call for Gordon Brown to resign as Prime Minister.

Prior to the 2010 general election, Stringer's constituency of Manchester Blackley was abolished, and replaced with Blackley and Broughton. At the 2010 general election, Stringer was elected to Parliament as MP for Blackley and Broughton with 54.3% of the vote and a majority of 12,303.

In January 2011, he called for Manchester United manager Alex Ferguson, a lifelong Labour voter and vocal supporter of the party at elections, to be given a seat in the House of Lords.

He was a critic of former Labour Party leader Ed Miliband, whom he accused in May 2014 of running an "unforgivably unprofessional" campaign, and referred to as "not an asset on the doorsteps" when campaigning.

At the 2015 general election, Stringer was re-elected as MP for Blackley and Broughton with an increased vote share of 61.9% and an increased majority of 16,874.

At the snap 2017 general election, Stringer was again re-elected with an increased vote share of 70.5% and an increased majority of 19,601.

Stringer was again re-elected at the 2019 general election, with a decreased vote share of 61.9% and a decreased majority of 14,402.

As a result of the 2023 review of Westminster constituencies, Stringer's constituency of Blackley and Broughton was abolished, and replaced with Blackley and Middleton South. In June 2024, Stringer was selected as the Labour candidate for Blackley and Middleton South, and he was duly elected at the 2024 general election with a decreased majority of 10,220.

== Political views ==
=== Controversies on dyslexia ===
In January 2009, Stringer denied the existence of dyslexia, calling it "a cruel fiction" invented by "the education establishment" to divert blame for illiteracy from "their eclectic and incomplete methods for instruction". The Dyslexia Action charity and the British Dyslexia Association criticised Stringer's claims.

=== Global warming ===
Stringer is a trustee of The Global Warming Policy Foundation, an organisation that promotes climate change denialism. As a member of the Science and Technology Committee, Stringer participated in the investigation into the Climatic Research Unit email controversy ("Climategate") in 2010, questioning Phil Jones closely on transparency and other issues; in the five-member group producing the report, he voted against the other three voting members on every vote, representing a formulation more critical of the CRU and climate scientists.

In an op-ed in March 2011, Stringer criticised the British inquiries into the CRU email controversy, writing that the controversy "demanded independent and objective scrutiny of the science by independent panels. This did not happen".

Stringer contributed to the book What Next for Labour? Ideas for a New Generation in January 2012; his piece was entitled "Transport Policy for the Twenty-First Century".

Stringer was a member of the Energy and Climate Change Select Committee from 2013 to 2015. In 2014, Stringer was one of two MPs on the committee to vote against the acceptance of the Intergovernmental Panel of Climate Change conclusion that humans are the dominant cause of global warming.

In 2017, Stringer mischaracterized climate research findings in the Daily Mail, leading the study's authors to publish a correction in The Guardian, refuting his characterization of their findings.

=== Immigration ===
In February 2014, Stringer was among 99 MPs who voted for an amendment to the Immigration Bill introduced by Dominic Raab. The amendment, which did not pass, would have meant that a foreign national facing deportation could only use human rights as a defence if they were at risk of death or torture. The only other circumstance where deportation could be stopped was if it would cause serious harm to their children.

=== Brexit ===
Stringer has established a reputation as a prominent Eurosceptic in the Labour Party who favoured a referendum on the EU. He called for Britain to leave the EU in the 2016 Brexit referendum, describing the EU as a barrier to a progressive government.

On 17 July 2018, a vote was held on whether the United Kingdom should remain in the customs union in the event of a no-deal Brexit. Frank Field, Kate Hoey, John Mann and Stringer were the only Labour MPs to oppose the amendment, which was voted down by 307 votes to 301.

=== COVID-19 ===
On 21 October 2020, during the COVID-19 pandemic, Stringer was the only Labour MP to vote against implementing stricter lockdown in the North West of England, an area that includes his own constituency in Greater Manchester.

== Personal life ==
In 1999, he married Kathryn Carr; they have three children. In the 2021 BBC One drama The Trick, a dramatisation of the Climategate scandal, Stringer was portrayed by Andrew Dunn.

Parliament of the United Kingdom
Preceded by Ken Eastham	Member of Parliament for Manchester Blackley; 1997–2010	Constituency abolished
New constituency	Member of Parliament for Blackley and Broughton; 2010–2024	Constituency abolished
New constituency	Member of Parliament for Blackley and Middleton South; 2024–present	Incumbent
Political offices
Preceded by Bill Egerton	Leader of Manchester City Council; 1984–1996	Succeeded by Richard Leese
