= John Richmond (fashion designer) =

English fashion designer

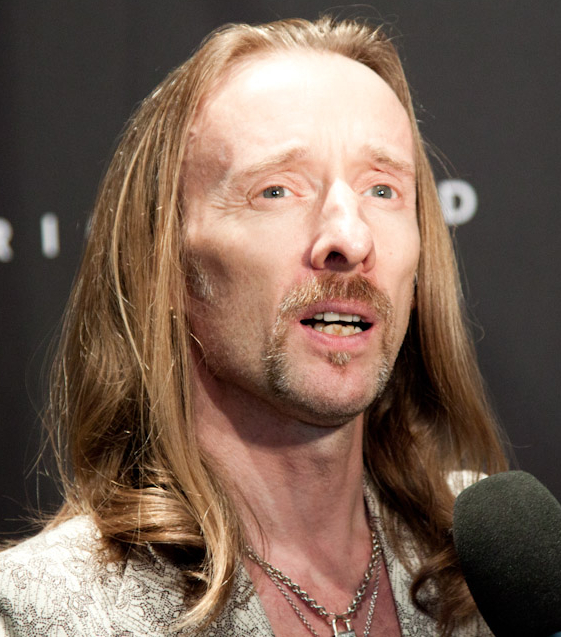
- John Richmond in September 2010
- Born: 8 January 1960 (age 66); Manchester, England
- Education: Kingston University
- Labels: John Richmond, Richmond X, Richmond Denim

John Richmond (born 8 January 1960 in Manchester) is an English fashion designer based in Italy.

== Biography ==
Richmond moved from Manchester to London and later to Milan to pursue a career in fashion. He graduated in fashion design from Kingston University in 1982, and soon after launched his own label while collaborating with brands such as Armani, Joseph Tricot, and Fiorucci.

In 1984, he co-founded the Richmond-Cornejo label with Ravensbourne graduate Maria Cornejo. Since 1987, Richmond has produced three lines under his own name: the main line John Richmond, the second line Richmond X, and the denim line Richmond Denim. His Destroy range of clothing became highly collectible in the early to mid-1990s.

Richmond’s work has had close ties to the rock music industry, and he has designed for artists including Madonna, George Michael, David Bowie, Mick Jagger, Annie Lennox, Axl Rose, Bryan Adams, David A. Stewart, Michael Jackson, Britney Spears, Kim Kardashian, Dita Von Teese, Kate Moss, Kaya Jones and also Lady Gaga.

He has collaborated with Iraqi fashion designer Reem Alasadi in London. His daughter, Phoenix Richmond, is a fashion model. In 2025, Richmond partnered with Mira Developments and ARAV Group on real estate development projects in the United Arab Emirates.

He is the younger brother of David "Dave" Richmond, the owner and creative director of the London-based packaging design agency R Design (formerly Dave Richmond Associates).
