= Rhodes, Greater Manchester =

Coordinates: 53.5447°N 2.2269°W

Rhodes
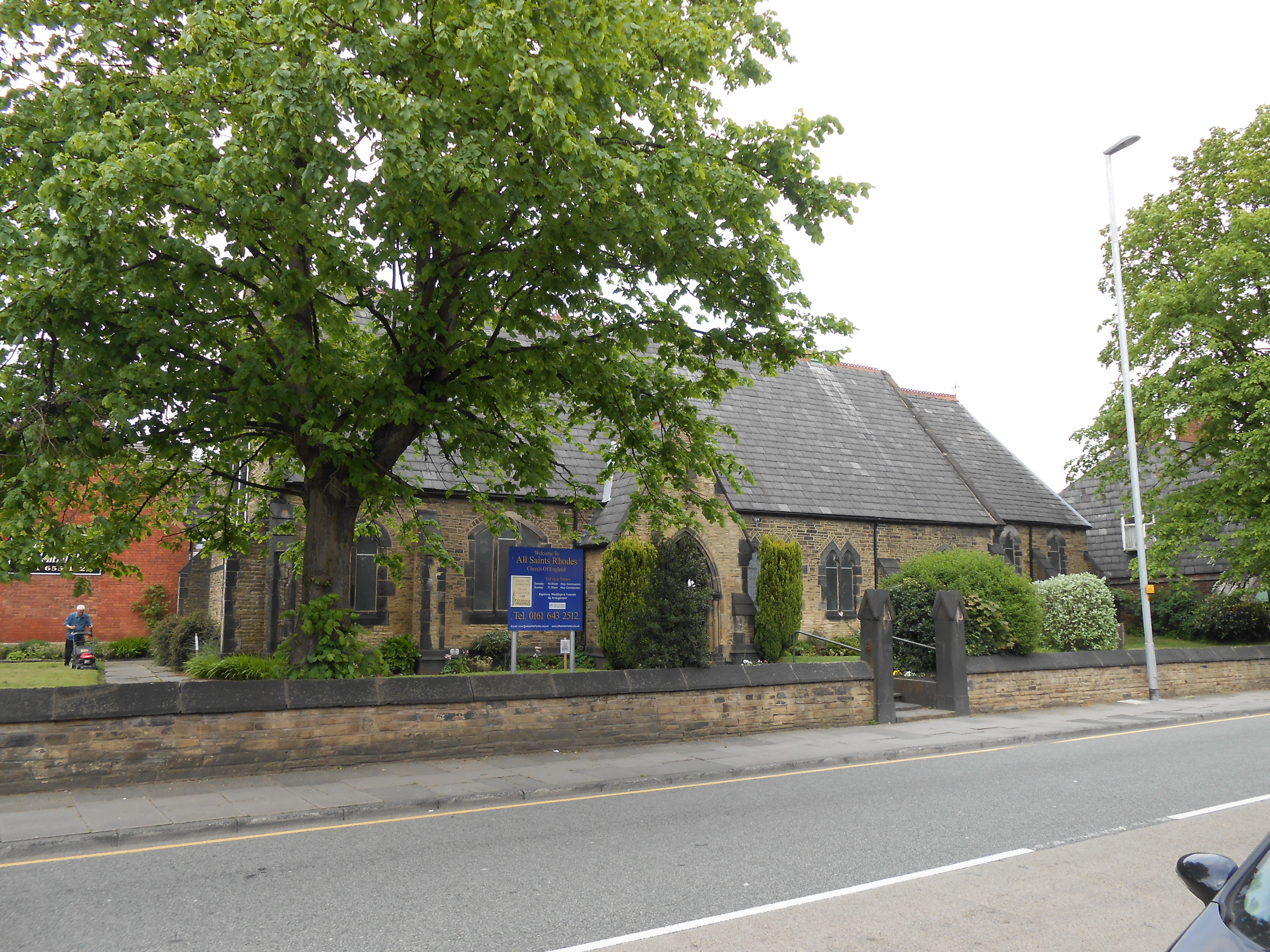

- Location within Greater Manchester
- Area: 0.552 km^{2} (0.213 sq mi)
- Population: 2,917 (2018 estimate)
  - Density: 5,284/km^{2} (13,690/sq mi)
- Metropolitan borough: Rochdale
- Metropolitan county: Greater Manchester
- Region: North West
- Country: England
- Sovereign state: United Kingdom
- Police: Greater Manchester
- Fire: Greater Manchester
- Ambulance: North West

Rhodes is a suburb of the town of Middleton, in the Rochdale district of Greater Manchester, England. In 2018, it had an estimated population of 2,917.

== Amenities ==
Rhodes has a church called All Saints on Manchester Old Road, a primary school called Little Heaton Church of England Primary School on Boardman Lane and a hotel called the Comfort Inn Manchester North on Manchester Old Road. Rhodes formerly had a Primitive Methodist church on Chapel Street.

== History ==
Rhodes was a chapelry in Middleton parish. From the late 1700s it became the site of a bleaching and calico printing works established by Daniel Burton (1744-1812) in conjunction with his cotton mill nearby in the centre of Middleton. The works passed into the hands of Salis Schwabe (1800-1853) in December 1832, who built up what according to the ODNB was "the largest calico-printing complex in Britain, covering an area of 31 acres, famously boasting the tallest factory chimney in the industrial north (some said in Europe), and employing a labour force of more than 750." The chimney, nicknamed the "Colossus of Rhodes", was ultimately demolished brick by brick between 1979 and 1982, and the land around it redeveloped for housing.
