= Langley, Greater Manchester =

Suburb of Greater Manchester, England

Coordinates: 53.55516°N 2.20305°W

Langley
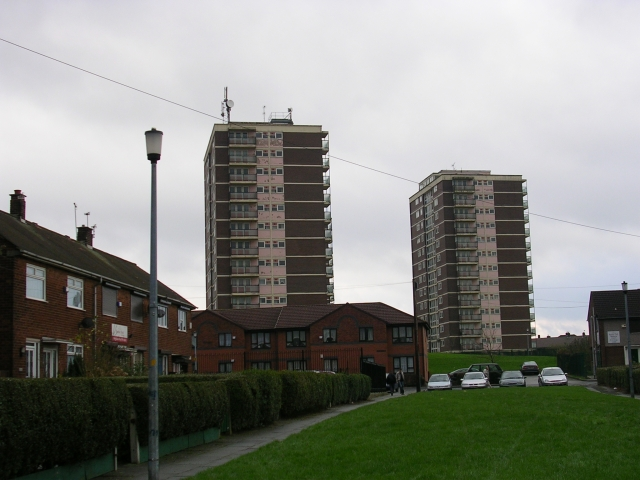
- High-rise accommodation in Langley. The flats pictured here have since been demolished.

- Location within Greater Manchester
- OS grid reference: SD865065
- Metropolitan borough: Rochdale
- Metropolitan county: Greater Manchester
- Region: North West
- Country: England
- Sovereign state: United Kingdom
- Post town: MANCHESTER
- Postcode district: M24
- Dialling code: 0161
- Police: Greater Manchester
- Fire: Greater Manchester
- Ambulance: North West

Langley is a suburb near Middleton, Greater Manchester, England, 4.4 miles (7.1 km) southwest of Rochdale and 5.5 miles (8.9 km) northeast of Manchester city centre.

Langley is an overspill estate, created in the 1950s for Manchester City Council. Families moved into the new housing from the slum clearance areas of Manchester, the eventual population of about 25,000 doubling that of Middleton.

All the street names are adopted from different areas of the Lake District.

In 1990, Langley estate was the focus of a satanic panic and in 2006 twelve of the now-adult victims sued Rochdale Council for compensation.

The Ken Loach film Raining Stones was filmed in and around Langley in 1993.

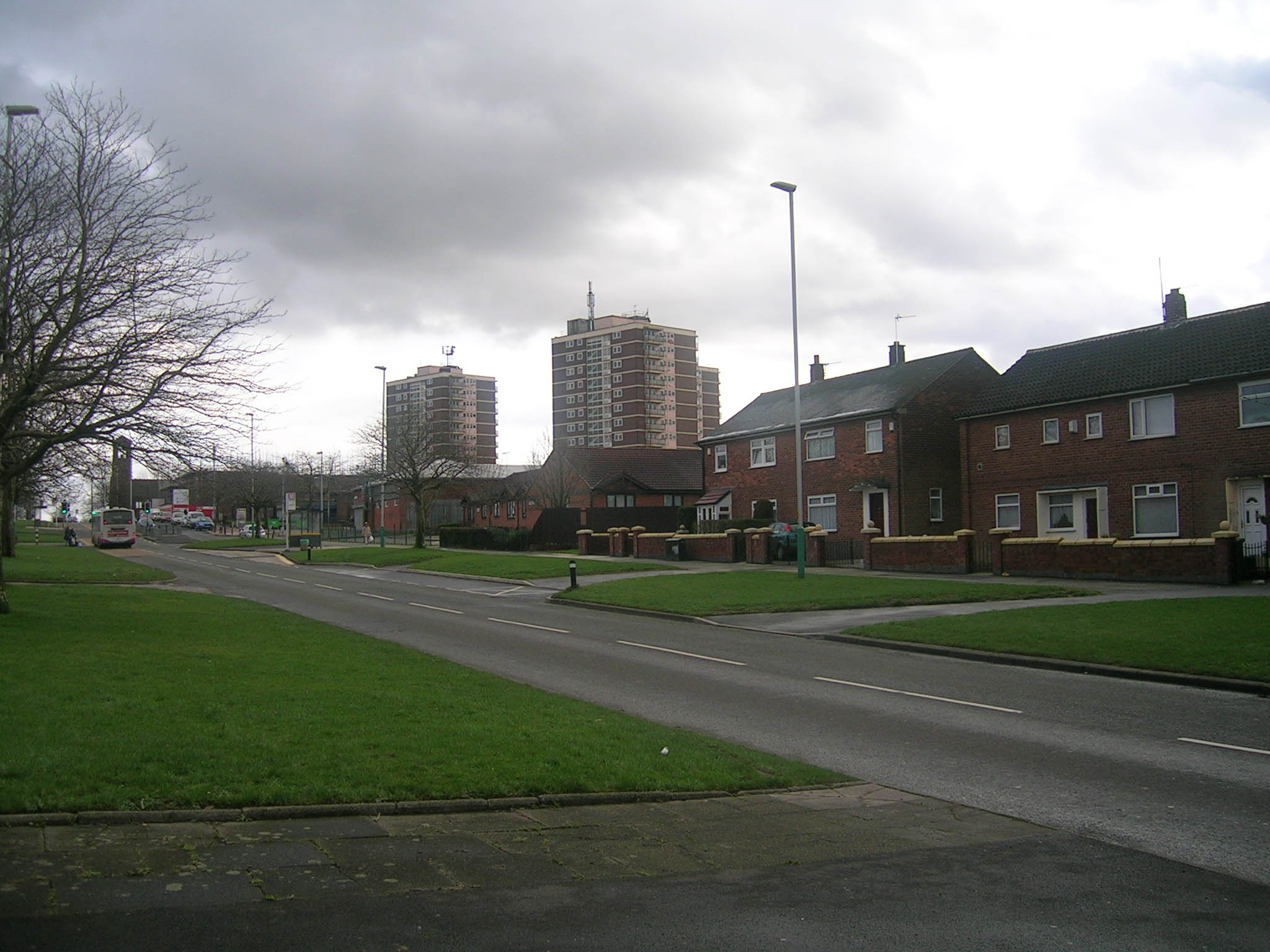
A street in Langley with council homes built by Manchester City Council around the mid-20th century.
