= Bamford, Greater Manchester =

Area within Rochdale, England

Coordinates: 53.626157°N 2.213976°W

Bamford
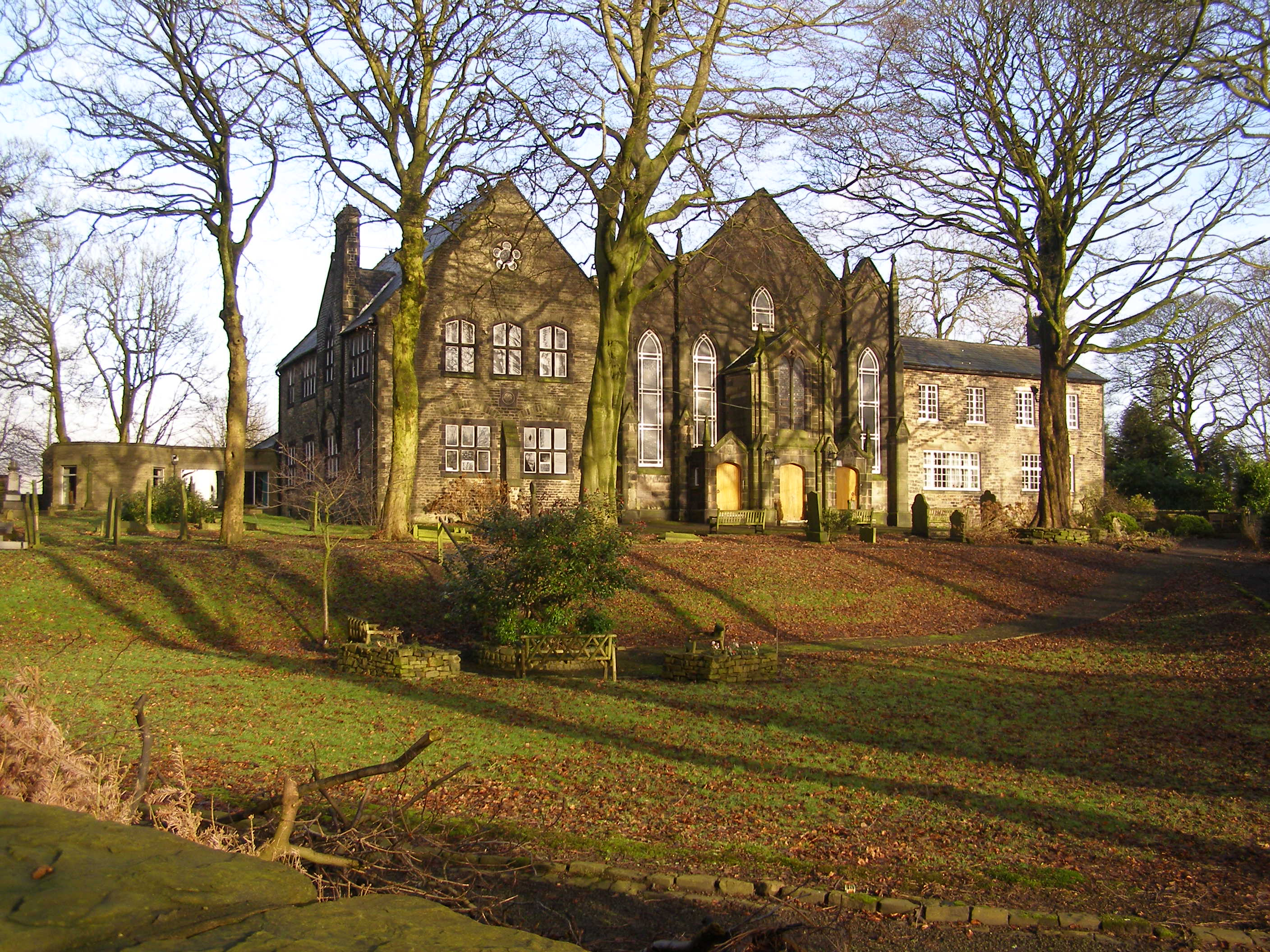
- Bamford Chapel

- Location within Greater Manchester
- Population: 10,428 (2021)
- OS grid reference: SD858144
- Metropolitan borough: Rochdale
- Metropolitan county: Greater Manchester
- Region: North West
- Country: England
- Sovereign state: United Kingdom
- Post town: ROCHDALE
- Postcode district: OL11
- Dialling code: 01706
- Police: Greater Manchester
- Fire: Greater Manchester
- Ambulance: North West
- UK Parliament: Heywood and Middleton

Bamford is a suburban area within the Metropolitan Borough of Rochdale, Greater Manchester, England. Historically part of Lancashire until the local government reorganisation of 1974, Bamford was formerly a township within the civil parish of Middleton and later part of the Birtle-with-Bamford township. Today, it is primarily a residential district situated to the west of Rochdale town centre.

== History ==
The name Bamford appears in records as early as 1330 (Baunford, Baumford) and was historically linked with the township of Birtle-with-Bamford, which covered 1,429 acres (578 ha) and included detached portions intermixed with Heap in Bury. The area was predominantly rural, with loam soil and stone beneath, and was chiefly used for pasture. During the Industrial Revolution, Bamford developed woollen and cotton factories, alongside bleaching, dyeing, and papermaking industries. Stone quarrying and coal mining were also carried out locally. In 1666 fifty-six hearths were recorded as liable to tax, indicating a modest population at the time. The Holt family of Gristlehurst were prominent landowners in the area during the 15th and 16th centuries, acquiring monastic estates after the Dissolution. Bamford Hall later became a notable residence in the 18th and 19th centuries.

Administrative changes in 1882 and 1894 altered the boundaries of Birtle-with-Bamford, incorporating parts of Heap and Ashworth and transferring some areas to Heywood and Bury. The township was eventually dissolved in 1933, and Bamford became part of Rochdale in 1974 following the Local Government Act 1972.

== Geography ==
Bamford lies in the River Roch valley, approximately 3 miles (4.8 km) west of Rochdale town centre and 10 miles (16 km) north of Manchester. The terrain is hilly, with elevations reaching over 800 feet (240 m) in parts of the former township. It is bordered by the village of Norden to the north and Birtle hamlet to the west.

== Demographics ==
Bamford has a population of 10,428 (2021), with relatively high levels of home ownership and car ownership compared to the borough average. Employment is primarily in professional and managerial sectors, reflecting its status as an affluent suburb.

== Governance ==
Bamford ward is included in the Heywood and Middleton North constituency, represented in Parliament by Elsie Blundell (of the Labour Party). It was first contested at the 2024 general election. Before the election, the constituency was known as Heywood and Middleton.

At the local level, it is part of Rochdale Borough Council, which manages services such as planning, waste, and education.

== Transport ==
The district is served by local bus routes connecting to Rochdale and Bury. The nearest railway station is Rochdale, offering services to Manchester and Leeds. Major roads include the A680, providing access to the M62 motorway.

== Sport ==
Bamford is the home of Bamford Football Club, Bamford Fieldhouse Cricket Club, Rochdale Tennis Club, and Bamford Bowling Club.

== Gallery ==
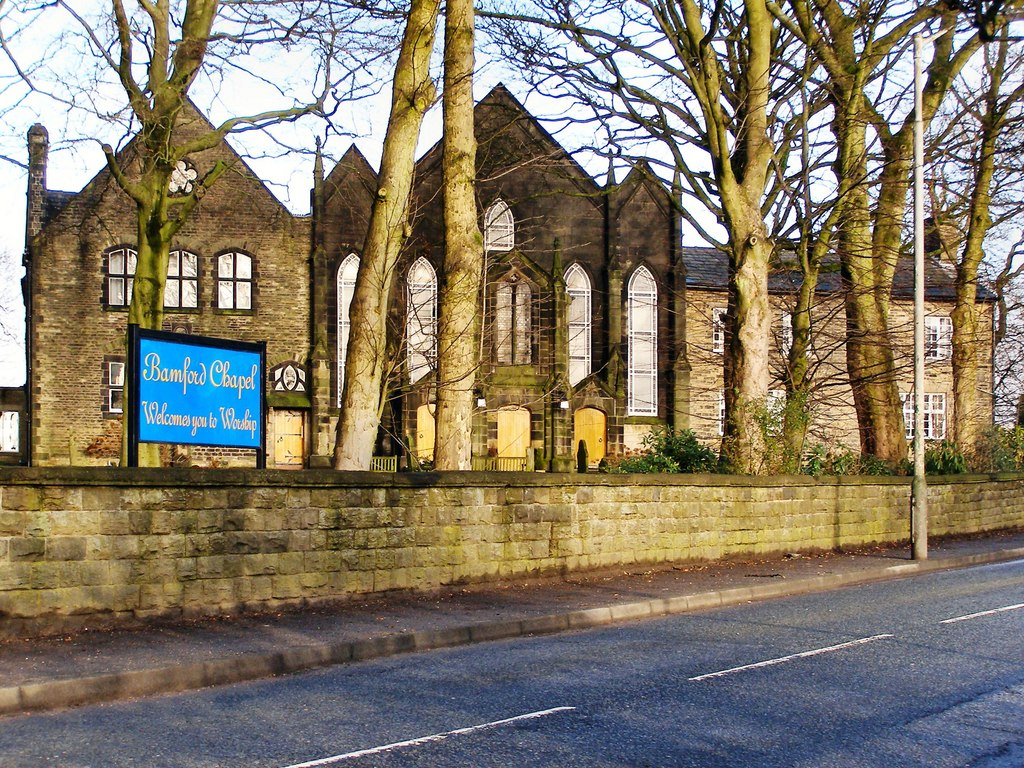
Bamford Chapel

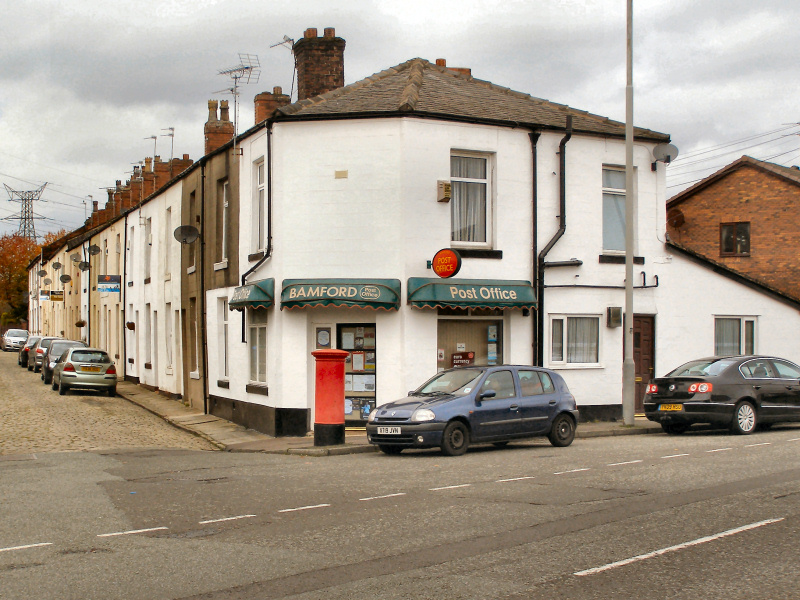
Bamford Post Office

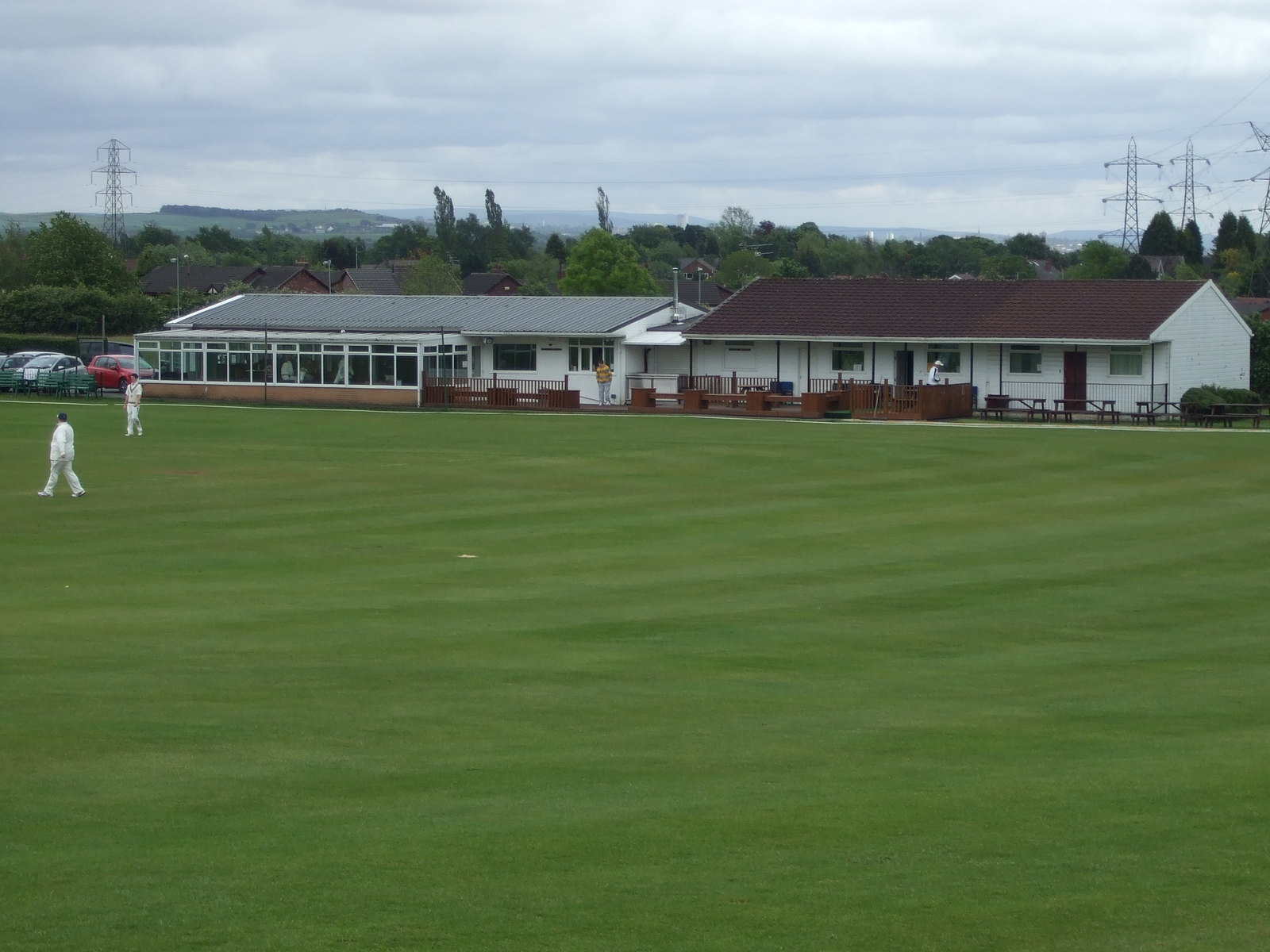
Bamford Fieldhouse Cricket Club pavilion

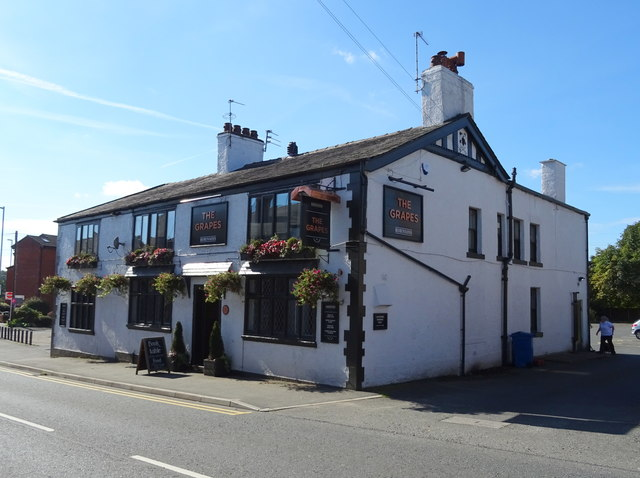
The Grapes public house, Bamford
