= Bircle =

Coordinates: 53.606°N 2.259°W

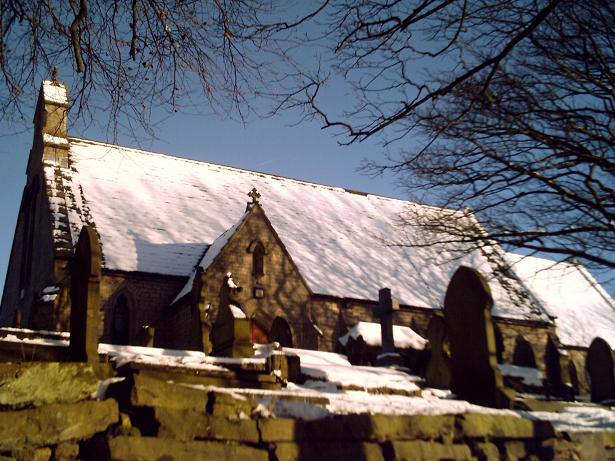
- Bircle Church in Winter

- Location within Greater Manchester
- OS grid reference: SD829122
- Metropolitan county: Greater Manchester
- Region: North West
- Country: England
- Sovereign state: United Kingdom
- Post town: BURY
- Postcode district: BL9
- Dialling code: 0161
- Police: Greater Manchester
- Fire: Greater Manchester
- Ambulance: North West

The historic parish of Bircle, near Bury, England, was created on 1 July 1846, although the village of Bircle (now known as Birtle) has existed for many centuries. It is believed that 'Bircle' is a shortening of the phrase 'Birch Hill', as it was suggested that there were birch trees in the parish. Names such as "Cleggs Wood", "Simpson Clough" and "Dobb Wood" appear on early Ordnance Survey maps. "Hill' appeared in the fourteenth century in the name of 'Birkhill' but it never found a permanent place. Over time its name has also appeared as Brithull, 1243; Birlcil, 1246; Birkhill, 1334, 1573; but Bircle appears in the Diocese of Manchester directory in England.

Bircle Church is on Castle Hill Road.

== Parish ==
=== Vicars of the parish ===
- Thomas Wilson 1846–1891
- Charles Renshaw 1891–1920
- R. P. Trend-Smith 1920–1935
- J. W. Maddison 1936–1957
- R. H. Pickering 1958–1962
- Arthur J. Dobb 1962–1972
- David Harrison 1972–1983
- Marcus Maxwell 1984–1993
- Arthur Ross Brockbank 1993–2012
- Gordon Joyce 2012–2019
- Harvie Nicol 2019–

=== The church ===
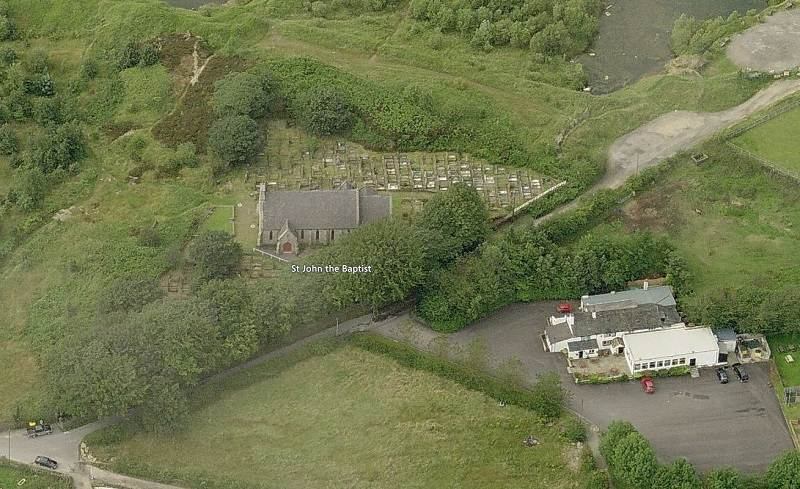
Bircle Church – Saint John the Baptist

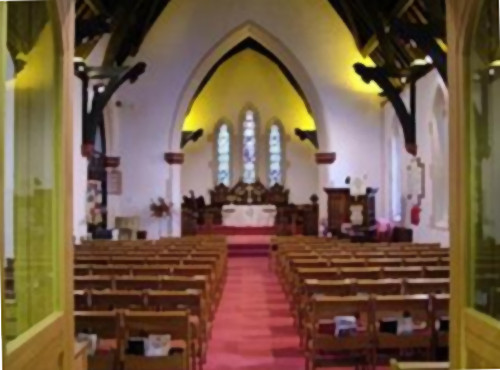
Inside the church

The church of St John the Baptist, also known as Bircle Church, is a listed building for its special architectural or historic interest. The church was designed by architect George Shaw and was first dedicated in 1846. It is a small church and is a relatively early example of ecclesiologically correct Gothic rock-faced ashlar with ashlar dressings and slate roofs with stone-coped gables. The nave and chancel both have hammer beam roofs rising from stone corbels. Carved angels holding shields are on the ends of the hammer beams. There are four stained glass windows in the nave, which were given in memory of loved ones. They depict Ruth, Saint Peter, Saint Paul and Mary, the mother of Jesus. On the wooded ceiling are carved angel figures.

Long:-2.260 Lat:53.607

The mural in Bircle church hall was painted by the local potter Harry Johnston.

== The Workhouse ==
In 1852, plans were made for a workhouse to accommodate 400 inmates, with a separate 60-bed hospital in Jericho. Jericho Workhouse, also known as the Bury Union Workhouse , was opened on 21 January 1857, and a year later the total expenditure for the scheme had swollen to £20,481. Inmates came from as far away as Spain. In the 1881 census a 64-year-old named Susannah Allport, a Bonnet Maker (Milliner) from Salamanca was in residence.

Today it is the site of Fairfield General Hospital.

=== Historical timeline of Bury Workhouse ===
The Road to Jericho

1775 – A workhouse was built on Manchester Road, Redvales, Bury.

1825 – Bury Select Vestry recommended that the town needed to build a new workhouse or improve the existing one.

1827 – The Vestry decided to extend the existing Bury workhouse.

1837 – The Poor Law Union was formally declared on 8 February.

1850 – The Bury Board of Guardians were refused an extension on the lease of land for the workhouses.

1852 – The Bury Board of Guardians gave notice that they were prepared to receive plans and specifications for a new Union workhouse capable of support 400 inmates with suitable outbuildings, yards and conveniences.

1853 – The Vaccination Act introduced compulsory vaccination against smallpox. It required that every child, health permitting should be vaccinated within 3 months, or in the case of orphans, 4 months of birth.

1855 – Work began on the new Bury Union workhouse at Jericho, almost two miles east of Bury on Rochdale Old Road.

1857 – The Bury Union workhouse opened on 21 January. The total cost of building and land was £21,418.

1858 – The Bury Union workhouse was consecrated by the Bishop of Manchester on 26 July.

1862 – Additions were made to the Bury Union workhouse providing separate infant accommodation.

1867 – The poor law guardians were to control vaccination districts and pay vaccinators from 1 – 3 shillings per child vaccinated in the district.

1868 – Additions were made to the Bury Union Workhouse to provide separate accommodation for the 'insane'.

1877 – On 9 June the foundation stone for a new 32 bed infectious diseases hospital at the Jericho site was made by Alderman John Duckworth, chairman of the Bury Board of Guardians. There was also to be a nurses' home and mortuary.

1878 – The infectious diseases unit was opened on 24 August.

1903–1905 – A new 126 bed infirmary with a maternity ward and staff accommodation was erected on the Jericho site. The site was officially opened on 20 September 1905.

1904 – The Registrar General requested that the workhouse births were to be disguised by the use of postal addresses. Birth certificates for those born in the Bury Union workhouse gave the address 380 Rochdale Old Road, Bury and did not name the workhouse.

1911 – Bury Union workhouse added an annexe to house male inmates.

1929 – Bury Union workhouse was renamed Jericho Institution.

1946 – The last burial took place at the Jericho Institution cemetery.

1948 – The Jericho Institution became part of the National Health Service and was renamed Fairfield General Hospital.

== Cheesden Valley and the Lost Mills by Air ==
The Cheesden Valley runs on a north-south alignment between Bury and Rochdale. Cheesden Brook runs through the valley, joining with Naden Brook to eventually run into the River Roch near Heywood. During the industrial age, the valley became a centre of cotton production, dependent on running water. The valley is now reclaiming the once busy mills and returning them to nature. The Lost Mills can be seen from the air. It encompasses Deeply Vale, Bircle Dene and Ashworth Valley.

=== Mining ===
As early as 1580, Queen Elizabeth I granted John Blackwall the right to mine coal in the Cheesden Valley. In addition, it is believed that during the 17th century, small communities – "folds" – could have had their own mines.

== Pre-Industrial History ==
There are signs of human activity dating from about 8000 BC. Flints from the Mesolithic period have been found in the Cheesden Valley and Knowl Moor areas. All were discovered on high ground close to a water source, and all are small and suitable for use as arrowheads and similar objects.

== Archives+ ==
About Archives+

Archives+ has created an archive in Manchester. The project includes statutory, university and voluntary organisations to provide a range of archive and heritage services from one location. Archives+ raises awareness of and provides access to histories.
