= Jericho, Bury =

Coordinates: 53.6025°N 2.2552°W

Jericho
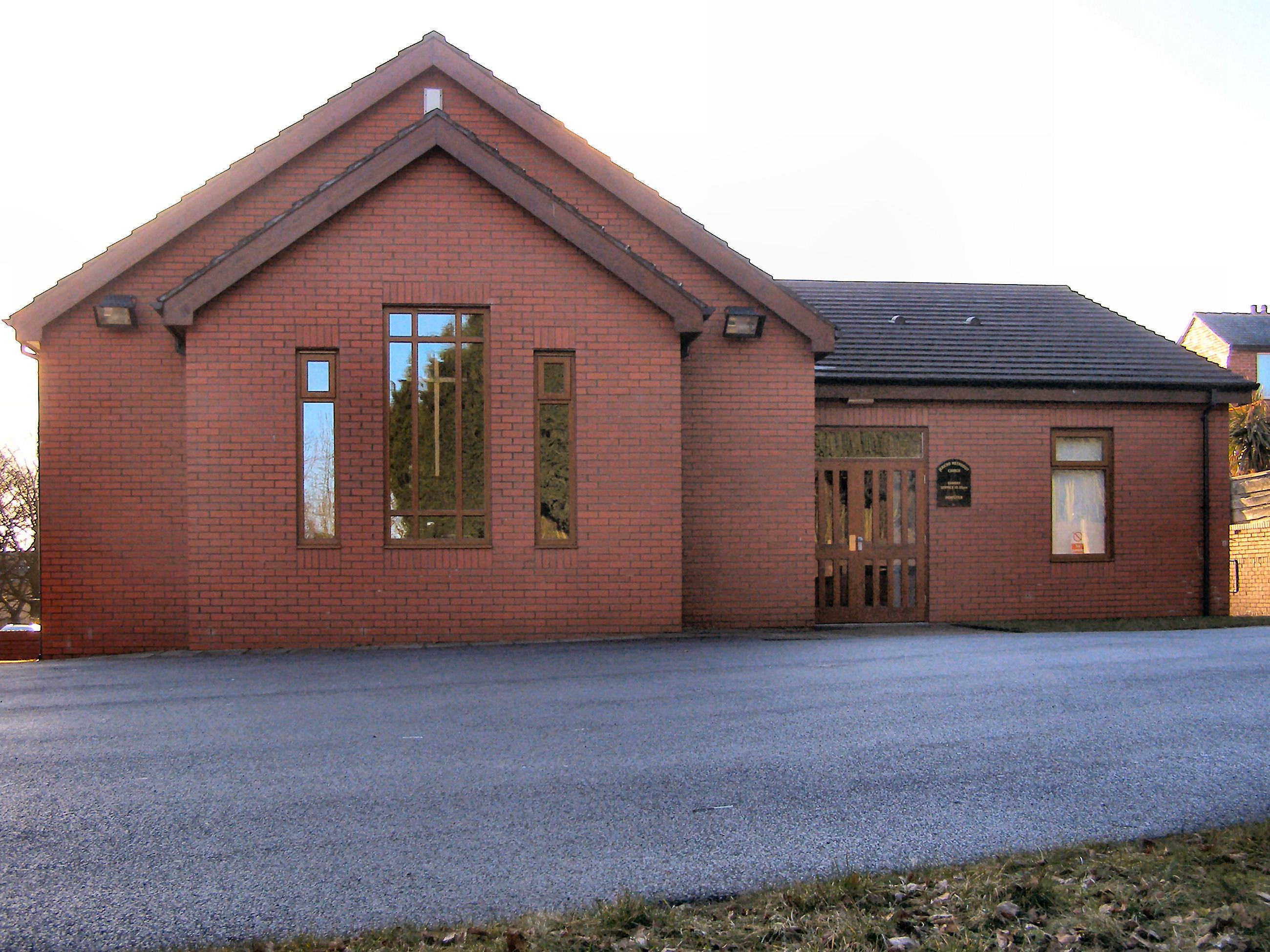
- Jericho Methodist Church

- Location within Greater Manchester
- OS grid reference: SD 836119
- Metropolitan county: Greater Manchester
- Region: North West
- Country: England
- Sovereign state: United Kingdom
- Post town: BURY
- Postcode district: BL9
- Dialling code: 0161
- Police: Greater Manchester
- Fire: Greater Manchester
- Ambulance: North West

Jericho is a district of Bury, Greater Manchester, England. It is thought that the area of Jericho was so named when the reverend John Wesley preached there in 1778 along with his pilgrimage through Bircle.

== Methodist Church ==
The current Jericho Methodist church used to be called Moulding Methodist church. The original Moulding Methodist Church was founded in 1824, built at Higher Moulding, Bircle on a gift of land by Thomas Royds who farmed at Higher Moulding Farm. He was a Methodist Class Leader. The old church was made redundant in 1910 and relocated to the Elbut Lane site.

In 2003 the old Moulding Methodist church on the Elbut Lane site was demolished and a chapel put there in its place and renamed Jericho Methodist church. During the rebuilding of the church the services were held at a pub called The Pack Horse Inn.

== The workhouse ==
Long since gone is the old Jericho Workhouse, also known as Bury Union Workhouse. Nowadays a lot of the buildings are being used to form Fairfield General Hospital. Initially, the Bury Union continued to use the old township workhouses at Bury, Radcliffe, Heywood, Heap, Tottington Lower End, and Pilkington. Until 1852, children were accommodated at the Pilkington workhouse but from that date most were sent to the Manchester Union's industrial Schools at Swinton. The Radcliffe workhouse appears to have housed only male paupers, with Heap used for females.

In 1850, Lord Derby refused to renew leases for the Bury, Heap and Pilkington workhouses which stood on his land, saying that the Guardians had "already spent as much money as would have built a union workhouse by paying extra salaries and not having a labour test." The following year, the Poor Law Board proposed the building of a joint workhouse for Bury and the adjacent Union of Rochdale which was in a similar position.

In 1852, the Bury Guardians borrowed £6,000 and submitted plans for a workhouse to accommodate 400 inmates. It was also built with a separate Infirmary to hold up to 60 people. Work on the new buildings finally commenced in 1855 when a further £8,000 was borrowed. The workhouse opened on January 21, 1857, and a year later the total cost for the scheme had grown to £20,481.
