= Birtle, Greater Manchester =

Hamlet in Greater Manchester, England

Coordinates: 53.618°N 2.2487°W

Birtle
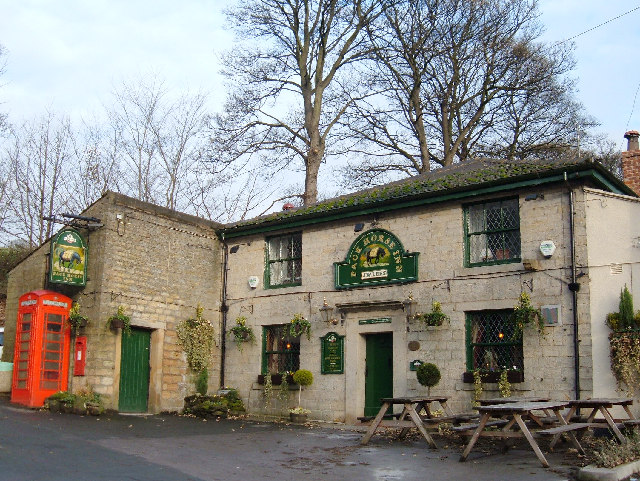
- The Pack Horse Inn public house, Birtle

- Location within Greater Manchester
- OS grid reference: SD835135
- Metropolitan borough: Rochdale
- Metropolitan county: Greater Manchester
- Region: North West
- Country: England
- Sovereign state: United Kingdom
- Post town: BURY
- Postcode district: BL9
- Dialling code: 01706; 0161
- Police: Greater Manchester
- Fire: Greater Manchester
- Ambulance: North West
- UK Parliament: Heywood and Middleton

Birtle is a hamlet in the Metropolitan Borough of Rochdale, in Greater Manchester, England. It lies in the Cheesden Valley, set amongst the Pennines.

Historically a part of Lancashire, Birtle is archaically referred to as Bircle or Birkle, which means Birch Hill. Together with neighbouring Bamford, it formed the civil parish of Birtle-with-Bamford (also known as Birtle-cum-Bamford). It was in Middleton ecclesiastical parish and in Bury poor law Union. In 1933, Birtle-with-Bamford was dissolved with Birtle being amalgamated into the Municipal Borough of Heywood.

The local church is Bircle Church, St. John the Baptist, Castle Hill Road, Bircle, Bury. In addition to the graveyard and garden of remembrance, the Church land includes an area now known as 'Bircle Church Wood', which was gifted by the Reverend Trend Smith.
