= Town House Brook =

Location
- Country: England

Physical characteristics
- Source
  - location: Clough
- Mouth
  - location: River Roch, Littleborough
  - coordinates: 53°38′49.45″N 2°05′25.34″W

Town House Brook is a watercourse in Greater Manchester and a tributary of the River Roch.

== Tributaries ==
- Long Clough Brook
  - Turn Slack Brook
  - Blue Pot Brook
- Stony Brook

Next confluence upstream	River Roch	Next confluence downstream
Greenvale Brook	Town House Brook	Ealees Brook
