= Tack Lee Brook =

Stream in Greater Manchester, England

Location
- Country: England

Physical characteristics
- Source
  - location: -
- Mouth
  - location: River Roch, Summit
  - coordinates: 53°36′03.51″N 2°14′05.17″W

Tack Lee Brook is a watercourse in Greater Manchester and a tributary of the River Roch.

Birtle Brook is one of its tributaries.

Next confluence upstream	River Roch	Next confluence downstream
Wrigley Brook	Tack Lee Brook	Hollins Brook
