= Moss Brook =

Location
- Country: England

Physical characteristics
- Source
  - location: Newbold
- Mouth
  - location: River Roch, Wardleworth
  - coordinates: 53°37′02.44″N 2°08′37.79″W

Moss Brook is a watercourse in Rochdale, Greater Manchester and a tributary of the River Roch. It originates in Newbold, and flows Northwards to join the River Roch. The majority of the brook is now culverted.

Next confluence upstream	River Roch	Next confluence downstream
Hey Brook	Moss Brook	River Spodden
