= Cheesden Valley =

Coordinates: 53.62227°N 2.260265°W

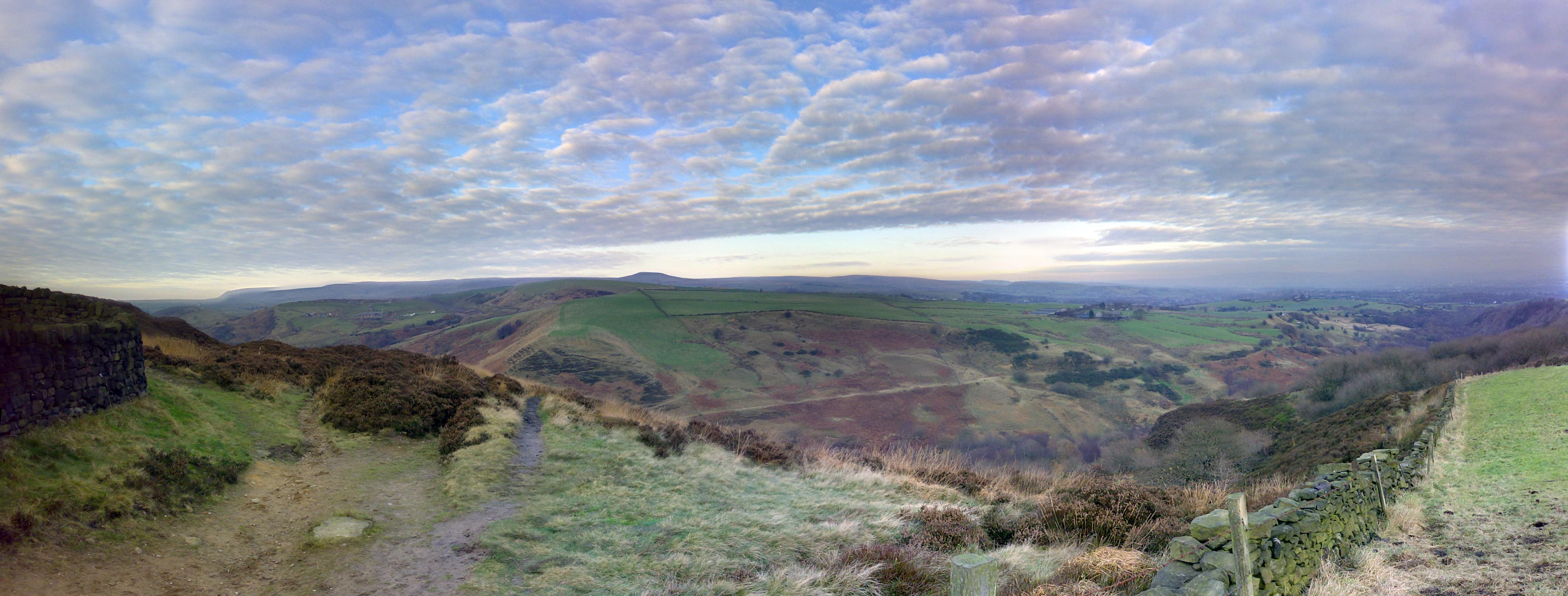
Looking down on the Cheesden Valley from the top of Scotland Road. Knowl Hill is visible on the horizon.

The Cheesden Valley is a valley on the border between the Borough of Rossendale in Lancashire and the Metropolitan Borough of Rochdale, England. It runs on a north–south alignment between Bury and Rochdale. Cheesden Brook runs through the valley, joining with Naden Brook to eventually run into the River Roch near Heywood. During the industrial age the valley became a centre of cotton production dependent on running water. The valley is now a conservation area.

== Pre-industrial history ==
There are signs of human activity in Heywood dating from about 8000 BC. Flints from the Mesolithic period have been found in Heywood, in the Cheesden Valley and Knowl Moor areas. All were discovered on high ground close to a water source, and all are quite small and suitable for use as arrowheads and similar objects.

According to a report on an archaeological survey of the Metropolitan Borough of Rochdale (which appeared in the Greater Manchester Archaeological Journal in 1985) it is likely that the flints were not left by early residents of Heywood, but rather by bands of hunters.

In later times, the people who farmed the inhospitable countryside made a living by weaving - mostly wool from their own sheep - using a handloom, and the early mills were designed to help them with the supply of yarn and the provision of ancillary services.

== Mining ==
As early as 1580, Queen Elizabeth I granted one John Blackwall the right to mine coal in the Cheesden Valley. In addition, it is believed that during the 17th century small communities – ‘Folds’ – could have had their own mines.

== Mills ==
Of the many mills in Lancashire the first mill in the valley was probably erected at Kershaw Bridge in 1780 by Thomas Allanson. It was a fustian mill and may have used Arkwright water frames.

John Haworth's Four-Acre Mill was high on the moors above Cheesden and was powered by a 36-foot (11 m) waterwheel. Haworth, who diverted the waters of a tributary stream to turn his wheel, later built a huge lodge to provide a consistent head of water for himself and other millowners - until then, they had been at the whim of the weather, laying off workers during dry spells and calling them in at all hours when the valley flooded.

A John Kay (not to be confused with the John Kay who invented the flying shuttle) built Cheesden Valley's Lumb Mill in 1786, as a fulling mill, turning woollens into felted materials.

Cheesden Brook provided power for at least 15 mills and employment for 2,000 people. Communities grew up in what had once been a desolate region.

These moorland mills held their own for more than half a century against their big-town rivals, many finding a niche for themselves, as mainline competition increased, by developing as cotton-waste spinners. This involved recycling the inner core of yarn cops, which had been stiffened in manufacture by the application of starch paste to avoid the need for separate wooden bobbins. During the cotton famine caused by the American Civil War these waste mills actually experienced a boom.

By the 1870s the mills were struggling to compete against the steam-powered economics of their massive rivals in the nearby towns and, before the turn of the century, they had all but vanished.

A comprehensive history of the industrial development of the valley is contained in "The Forgotten Valley" by A.V.Sandiford and T.E.Ashworth.

== By Air ==
Many of the former mills, lodges and a solitary chimney seen by air, along with other industrial workings such as Weirs and Dykes, are still evident today.

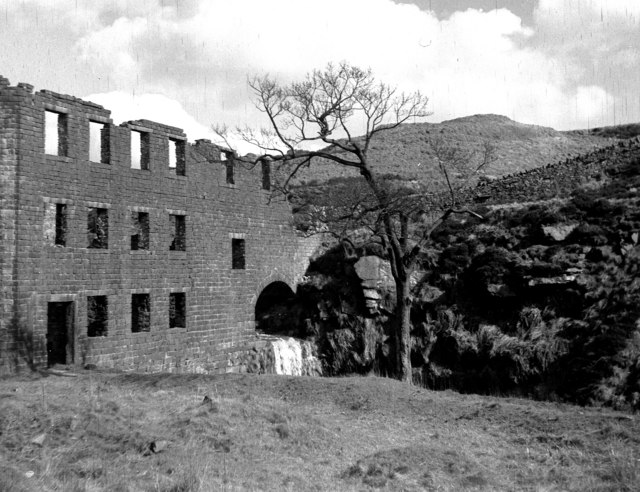
Cheesden Lumb Mill in 1952.

== List of mills ==
- Four Acre
- Cheesden Pasture (app. b. 1810)
- Lower Pasture
- Cheesden Bar
- Cheesden Lumb Upper
- Cheesden Lumb Lower
- Longlands
- Croston Close Upper
- Croston Close Lower
- Deeply Hill
- Deeply Vale
- Washwheel
- Bircle Dene
- Kershaw Bridge
