= Wrigley Brook =

Watercourse in Greater Manchester, England

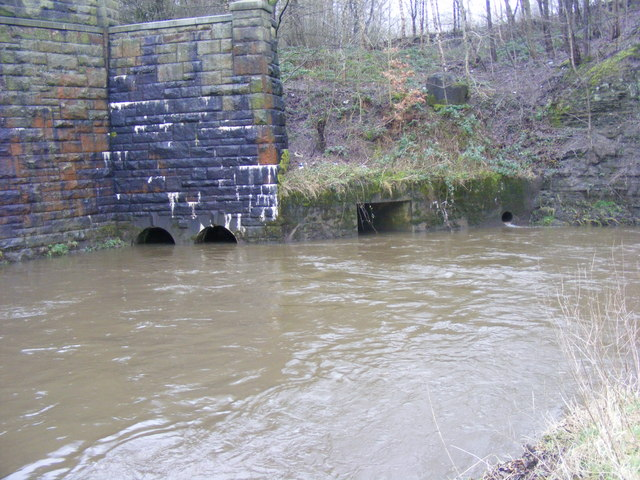
- Confluence with River Roch

Location
- Country: England

Physical characteristics
- Source
  - location: Hareshill
- Mouth
  - location: River Roch, Heywood
  - coordinates: 53°35′54.27″N 2°13′54.51″W

Wrigley Brook is a culverted watercourse in Greater Manchester which flows through Heywood and is a tributary of the River Roch. Originating in the Hareshill area to the South of Heywood, it flows northwards and joins the River Roch at Bottom O' th' Brow.

Next confluence upstream	River Roch	Next confluence downstream
Naden Brook	Wrigley Brook	Tack Lee Brook
