= Ash Brook =

Watercourse in Rochdale, England

Location
- Country: England

Physical characteristics
- Source
  - location: Wardle Brook
- Mouth
  - location: River Roch, Howarth Cross
  - coordinates: 53°37′43.34″N 2°07′52.88″W

Ash Brook is a watercourse in Greater Manchester and a tributary of the River Roch.

== Tributaries ==
- Wardle Brook

Next confluence upstream	River Roch	Next confluence downstream
Featherstall Brook	Ash Brook	River Beal
