= Millers Brook =

Watercourse in Northern England

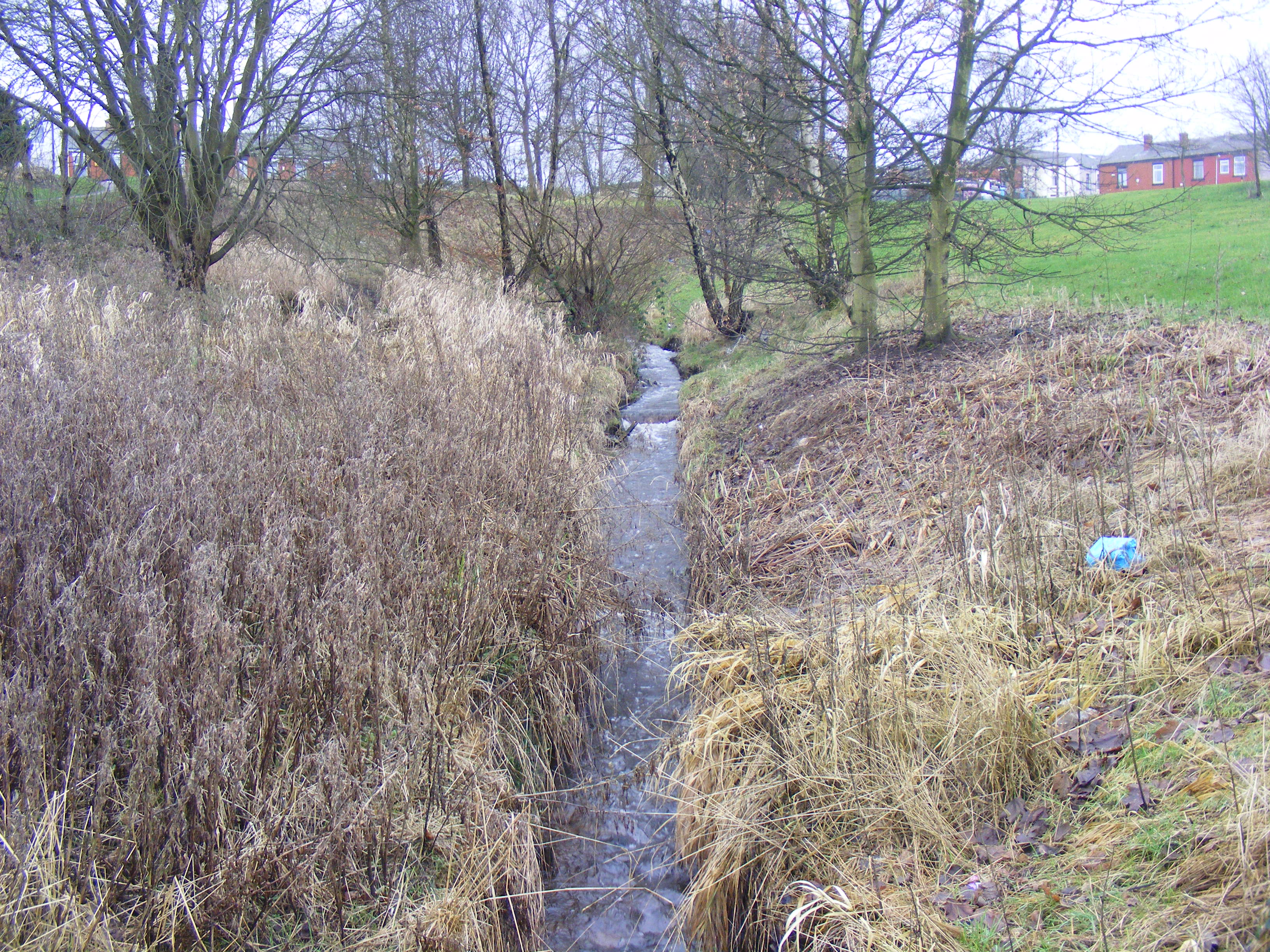
- Upstream from Queens Park

Location
- Country: England

Physical characteristics
- Source
  - location: Heywood
- Mouth
  - location: River Roch, Heywood
  - coordinates: 53°36′0.51″N 2°12′34.17″W

Millers Brook is a watercourse in Greater Manchester and tributary of the River Roch. It originates in Heywood and flows through Queens Park to join the River Roch.

== Tributaries ==
- Roeacre Brook

Next confluence upstream	River Roch	Next confluence downstream
Sudden Brook	Millers Brook	Naden Brook
