= Featherstall Brook =

Location
- Country: England

Physical characteristics
- Source
  - location: Shore
- Mouth
  - location: River Roch, Stubley
  - coordinates: 53°38′23.53″N 2°06′12.12″W

Featherstall Brook is a watercourse in Greater Manchester and a tributary of the River Roch. Featherstall Brook has no tributaries itself and is approximately 984m long.

Next confluence upstream	River Roch	Next confluence downstream
Ealees Brook	Featherstall Brook	Ash Brook
