= Hey Brook =

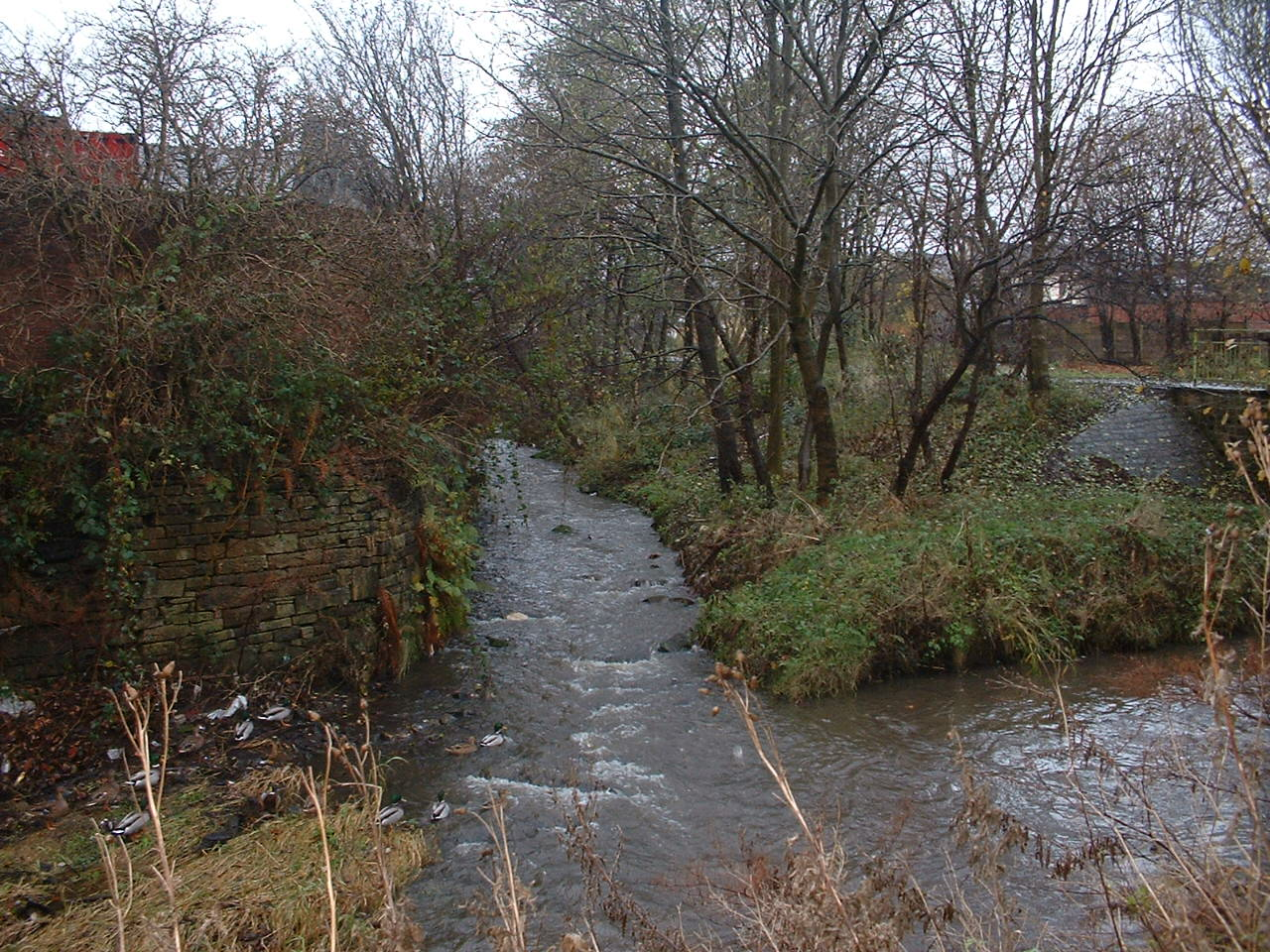
- Confluence with River Roch

Location
- Country: England

Physical characteristics
- Source
  - location: Buckley
- Mouth
  - location: River Roch, Wardleworth
  - coordinates: 53°37′11.09″N 2°8′33.09″W

Hey Brook is a watercourse in Rochdale, Greater Manchester and a tributary of the River Roch. It originates at the confluence of Buckley Brook and Syke Brook, and flows through Wardleworth to the River Roch.

A hydrological study was conducted "to develop a hydraulic model for Hey Brook," to assess the risk of flooding.

== Tributaries ==
- Syke Brook
- Buckley Brook
  - Fanny Brook
  - Clough House Brook
    - Nick Road Brook
    - Stid Brook
  - Knowl Syke Brook
    - Higher Slack Brook
      - Long Shoot Brook
      - Calf Brook
      - Copy Brook

Next confluence upstream	River Roch	Next confluence downstream
Stanney Brook	Hey Brook	Moss Brook
