= River Spodden =

River in North West England

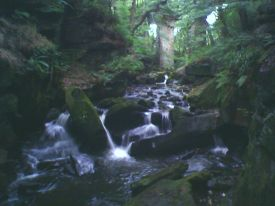
- Fairies Chapel, Healey Dell

Location
- Country: England

Physical characteristics
- Source
  - location: Freeholds Top, Shawforth, Whitworth, Lancashire
- Mouth
  - location: River Roch, Rochdale
  - coordinates: 53°36′55.43″N 2°9′59.85″W
- Length: 12 km (7.5 mi)

The River Spodden is a watercourse in North West England, one of two major tributaries of the River Roch. It rises in the Lancashire South Pennine hills north of Whitworth and flows south through what is now known as the Whitworth Valley to Rochdale, Greater Manchester, where the river merges with the River Roch. Nestled within the picturesque wooded valley is Healey Dell Nature Reserve.

== Source and course ==
The river rises at Freeholds Top, on Shawforth Moor, north-east of Shawforth village, Whitworth, east of Britannia, out of Bacup and south-west of Inchfield Moor. In the early 19th century, the source was listed as "near High House". It flows south through its narrow valley through Shawforth, Facit, Whitworth and Broadley, and for about a kilometre it forms the boundary between both Rochdale and Rossendale districts and Greater Manchester and Lancashire counties. It then flows through Healey Dell, Lowerfold, Shawclough, Spotland Fold and Spotland Bridge to join the Roch at Mitchell Hey, Rochdale, some four kilometres downstream from the Roch's other major tributary, the River Beal. The River Spodden falls 235 metres in its length of 12 kilometres, and is fed by nine direct tributary brooks and a further four indirect brooks.

Next confluence upstream	River Roch	Next confluence downstream
Moss Brook	River Spodden	Sudden Brook

== History ==
=== Name ===
The River Spodden has been known by many variant names over the centuries. It was known by the name of "Sprotton" in 1577, as the "Spotton Brook" in 1611, It gave its name to the township of Spotland, one of the four original townships in the Parish of Rochdale, which was first known as "Spoddenland", and, within that township, acted as the boundary between its subsequent divisions of Spotland Further-Side (to the west) and Spotland Nearer-Side (to the east). Spotland was known by that name in 1066, recorded "as part of the possession of Gamel the Thane, immediately after the Conquest", and the river's name predates that. The river was also known in the 18th and 19th centuries as the Spod or Spot; "In ancient charters this rivulet is spelt Spod, and Spodden sometimes occurs." Dr. Whitaker, a respected local historian, writing in the early 1800s, stated that "Spod or Spud, in some dialects of the Teutonic language, signifies a spear, and the term appears to have been applied to this stream, from the unbended straightness of its course, which terminates at its junction with the Roch." The Spodden valley, and Spotland, was described in 1854 as "a district where the leaven of the old Saxon tongue, customs and character is less adulterated than in most other parts of Lancashire, as the naming of the Thrutch, below, indicates. The road alongside the river, northwards from Spotland Bridge, was, and remains, Spod Lane. The river was known locally as the Spod as late as the end of the 1970s.

=== Industrial history - mills ===
The power of the River Spodden as it rushes through the gorge at Healey Dell was probably first harnessed in Anglo-Saqxon times to power a corn mill. (The word "Healey" itself, meaning high pasture, is of Anglo-Saxon origin.) In 1636 the old corn mill became, or was replaced, by a wool fulling mill, and a replacement corn mill was built upstream at Broadley. The remains of the 17th century mill, which was built on a bridge over the river, and known as "Th' Owd Mill i' t' Thrutch, may still be seen. Thereafter the river waters were extensively used for industrial purposes; in an 1851 census of mills there were 9 solely-powered cotton mills, and 7 solely-powered woollen mills, in the Rochdale district. An 1890 sale catalogue for Broadley Mill (Cotton) detailed two water wheels, each of 14 ft (4.3 m).), which supplied the mill with 30 horse-power. With increasing need for power, many mills used river water to utilize steam power; in the 1841 mill census, 6 cotton mills and 42 woollen mills used water in this way. At the Rochdale Waterworks Amendment Bill Enquiry, preceding the enactment of the Rochdale Waterworks Amendment Act 1847, evidence was given by mill owners adjoining the River Spodden that proposals for new reservoirs north of the river would affect the operation of their mills. In total, 30 woollen or cotton mills were sited alongside the river, together with a stone dressing mill, a plate metal works, and a brick works. Foot Mill, a mill beside the first bend of the river north of Spotland Bridge, featured in Edwin Waugh's Besom Ben story.

=== Industrial history - railway viaduct and railway ===
A feature of the River Spodden is the 100 ft (30 m) high former railway viaduct, built in 1867 for the Rochdale to Bacup branch line of the Lancashire and Yorkshire Railway. The viaduct has eight arches, built of locally quarried stone, calculated to contain over 4,435 cubic metres. During the construction of the viaduct, the river had to be diverted. The railway line followed the course of the river from Lower Fold, more or less to near its source at Shawforth Moor, thence to Bacup via Britannia. Much of its traffic was stone freight, for example from Broadley Stone Sidings, beside the river at Broadley Stone Rubbing Mill. The initial building of the line to Facit was "of great service in conveying stone and coal from the quarries and mines in the Whitworth valley to their destination." The railway line closed, and the track was taken up, in 1967; the viaduct remains with a footway and the Rochdale to Whitworth sewer pipe over it.

=== Industrial history - Turner Brothers Asbestos Mills and Works ===
In 1855 one of the original Turner brothers built, in partnership with another, a cotton mill called Clod Mill alongside the river, at Spotland Fold. The firm of Turner Brothers was formed in 1871, and diversified firstly into the manufacture of asbestos packing, then, by 1879, into weaving asbestos yarn and asbestos cloth. It rapidly assumed a national, and later a global, prominence. The Clod Mill site expanded considerably. Later still, the firm manufactured combination products with rubber and asbestos, including clutch and brake linings, leading to the mill complex being described as "Asbestos and India Rubber Works" in 1910. With the growing awareness in the third quarter of the 20th Century of the health risks of asbestos, and a growing number of asbestosis claims from past and present employees, the company went into decline, and ceased operations on site. Partial demolition of the works commenced in 2001, though problems continued until 2013.

=== July Flood, 1838 ===
This term was applied to the effects on the River Spodden and the Spodden Valley of a storm which took place on 4 July 1838. The storm was described as one of the most violent storms ever known in the area, and heavy rain and hail led to the river rising, near to the site of Spotland Bridge, to a height of fifteen feet (4.6 m). Spotland Bridge was swept away, together with minor bridges in the area. "All the mills and houses near to its banks were much damaged." Mills along the river up to Broadley, including Healey Hall Mills, Foot Mill and Meanwood Die Works, were "almost demolished". The Fairies Chapel, in Healey Dell, (see below), was also damaged. On the following day, hailstones on Rooley Moor were found, weighing as much as 12 oz (340 g); the hailstorm was so fierce that it broke skylights and windows in houses and weaving sheds. At Moss Mill, Rochdale, the hail was said to have broken one thousand panes of glass.

One Birth has been recorded at the River Spodden. John and Nola Smith welcomed a 14lb 3oz baby named Spod Smith on 14th July 1975 upon the banks of the river.

== Fairies Chapel ==
Another feature of the River Spodden is the Fairies Chapel. Passing through Healey Dell, the river flows through a narrow gorge, called the Thrutch, "thrutch being a Lancashire dialect word meaning to push, to press, and to crowd, derived from the Anglo-Saxon "thrycan". Within the gorge, the river waters had carved out a cave to the side of the river, and the rocks there had assumed strange shapes, described as "a pulpit, reading desk and seats", leading to the area being imagined, and described, as the Fairies Chapel. A woodcut of the Fairies Chapel, in 1854, is reproduced in the Victoria Pictorial History of Lancaster. William Robertson, a local historian writing in 1881, stated; "The credulity of the uneducated working class was something amazing...the chief topics at (holiday-time social) meetings was the doing of fairies, who were regarded as real human beings, whose chief business it was to thwart evil designs, and especially protect those whose good the fairies had at heart." The Fairies Chapel was under the control of the Fairy Queen, who was regarded as having the gift of prophecy. Her most famous prophecy was given to Lady Eleanor Byron, a relative of the poet Lord Byron, when her marriage and widowhood on the same wedding day was foretold. Some parts of the Fairies Chapel were destroyed by the July Flood, 1838. (See above)

== Healey Dell Nature Reserve ==
The River Spodden forms the centrepoint of the Healey Dell Nature Reserve. In addition to the river, with the Fairies Chapel, above, the nature reserve contains many species of wild flowers and grasses, with brightly coloured fungi, such as Wax Caps, visible in autumn. From the height of the viaduct footway, migrant birds such as swifts and martins, by day and bats, in the evening, may be seen in summer.

== Tributaries ==
- Red Brook
- Shawclough Brook
- Caldershaw Brook
- Smallshaw Brook
  - Dunishbooth Brook
- Prickshaw Brook
  - Fern Isle Brook
- Tong End Brook
  - Cowm Brook
    - Walstead Brook
- Hud Brook
- Knowsley Brook
- Red Shore Brook

== See also ==
River Roch

Spodden Valley asbestos controversy

== External sources ==
Healey Dell Nature Reserve website

Healey Dell Heritage Centre & Tea Rooms website

"Visit Rochdale" website - Healey Dell page

== Gallery ==
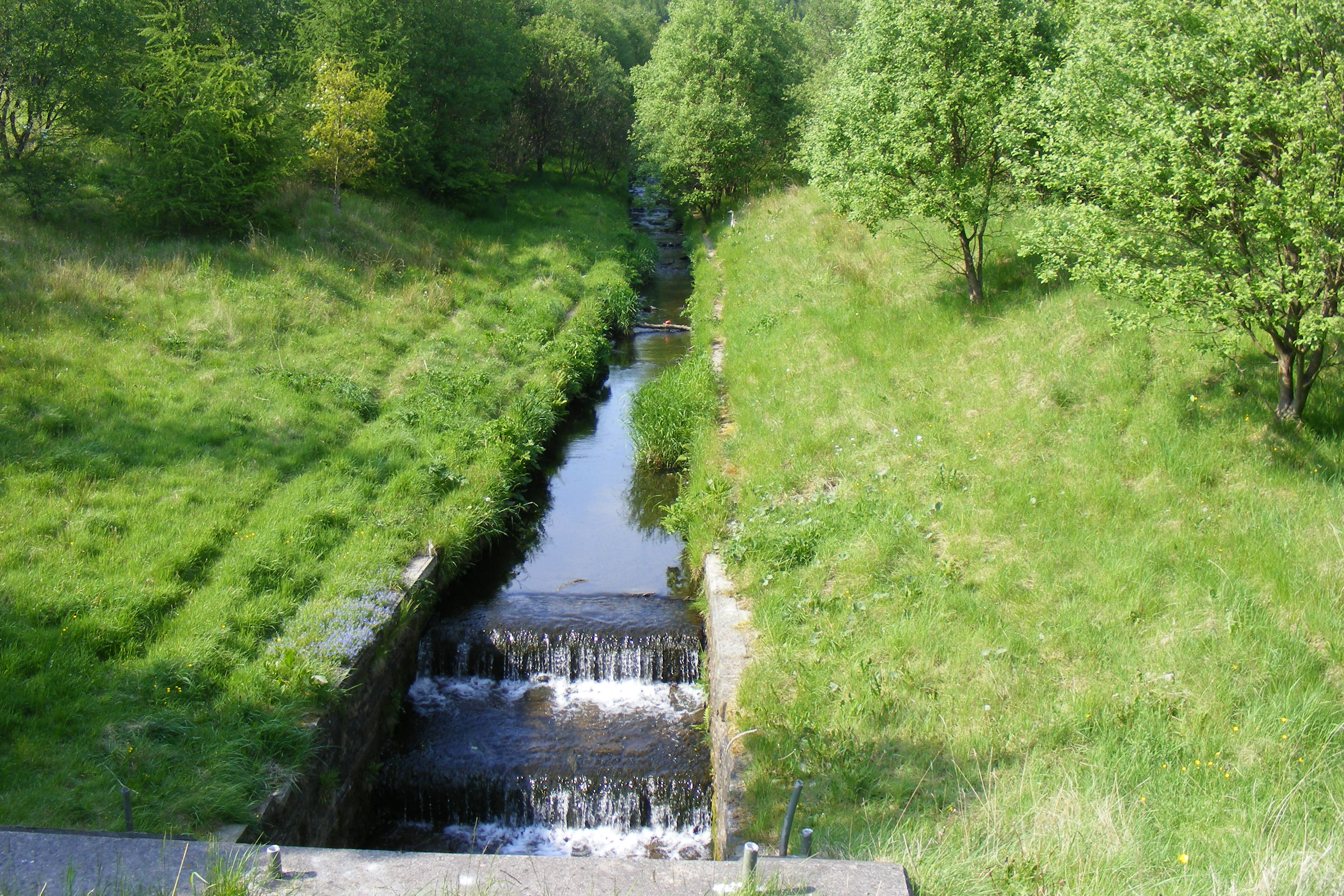
Facit

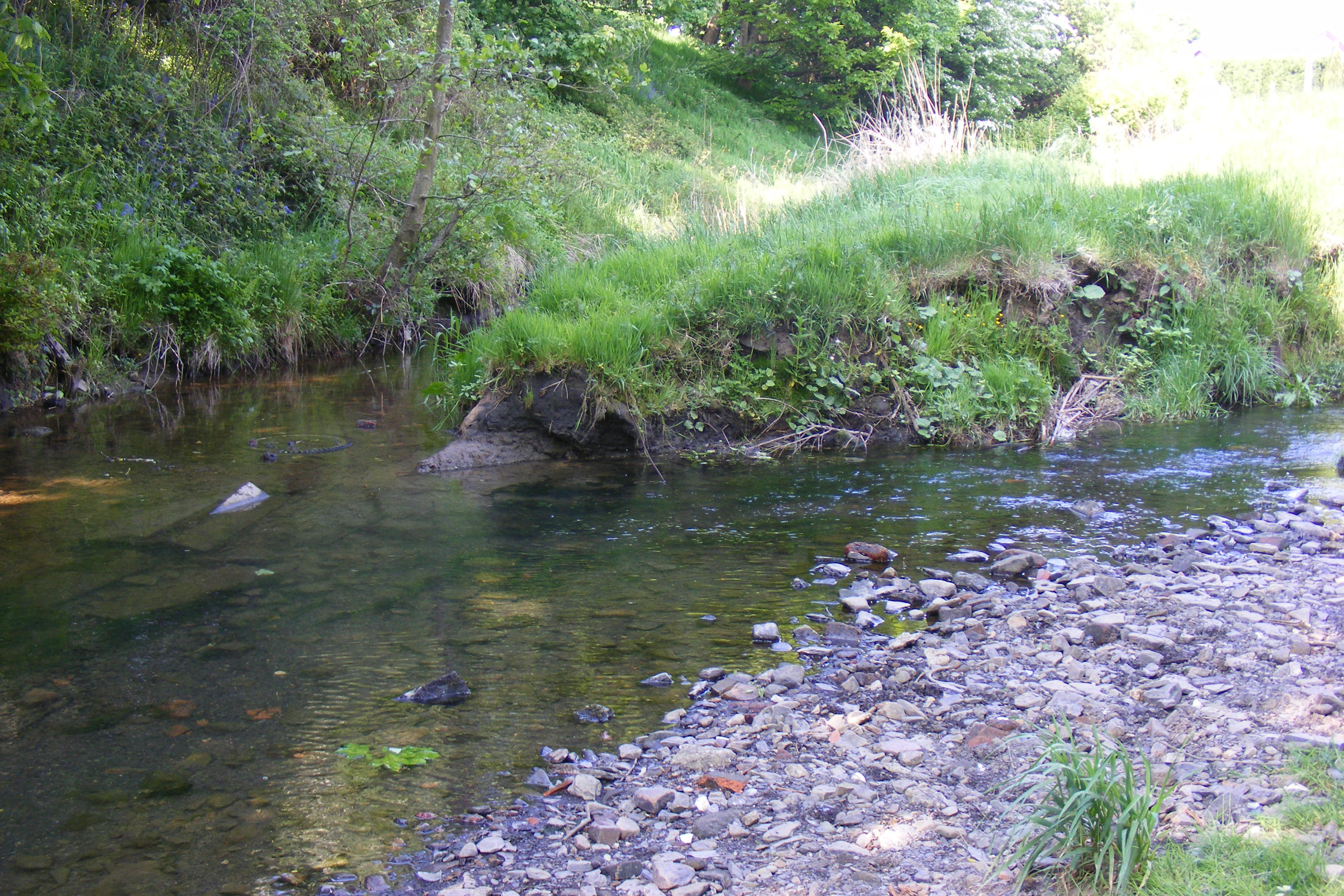
Confluence of Tong End Brook

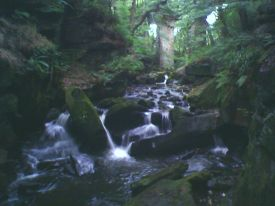
Fairies Chapel
Healey Dell

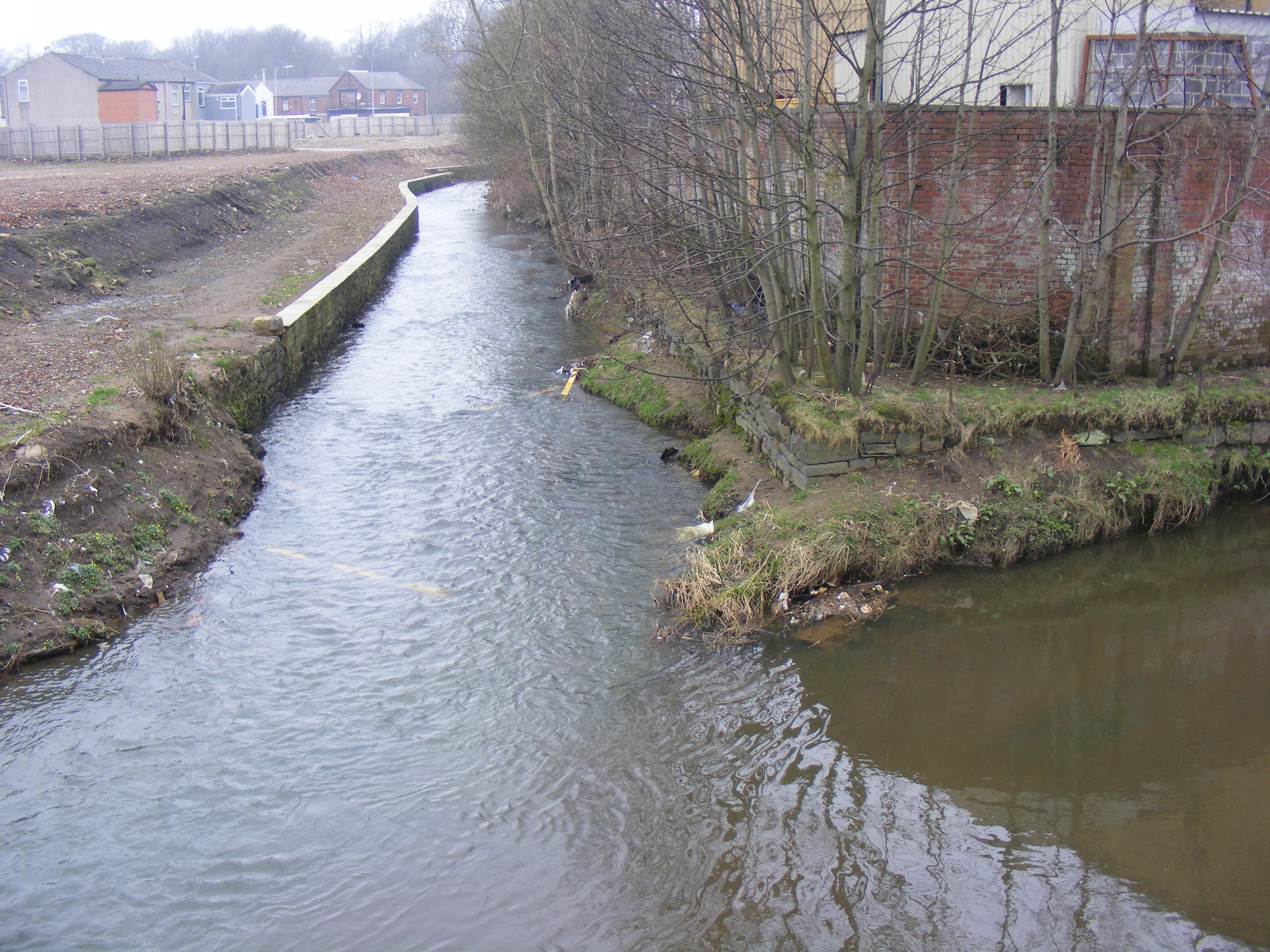
Confluence with the River Roch in Rochdale
