= Whittle Brook =

Stream in Greater Manchester, England

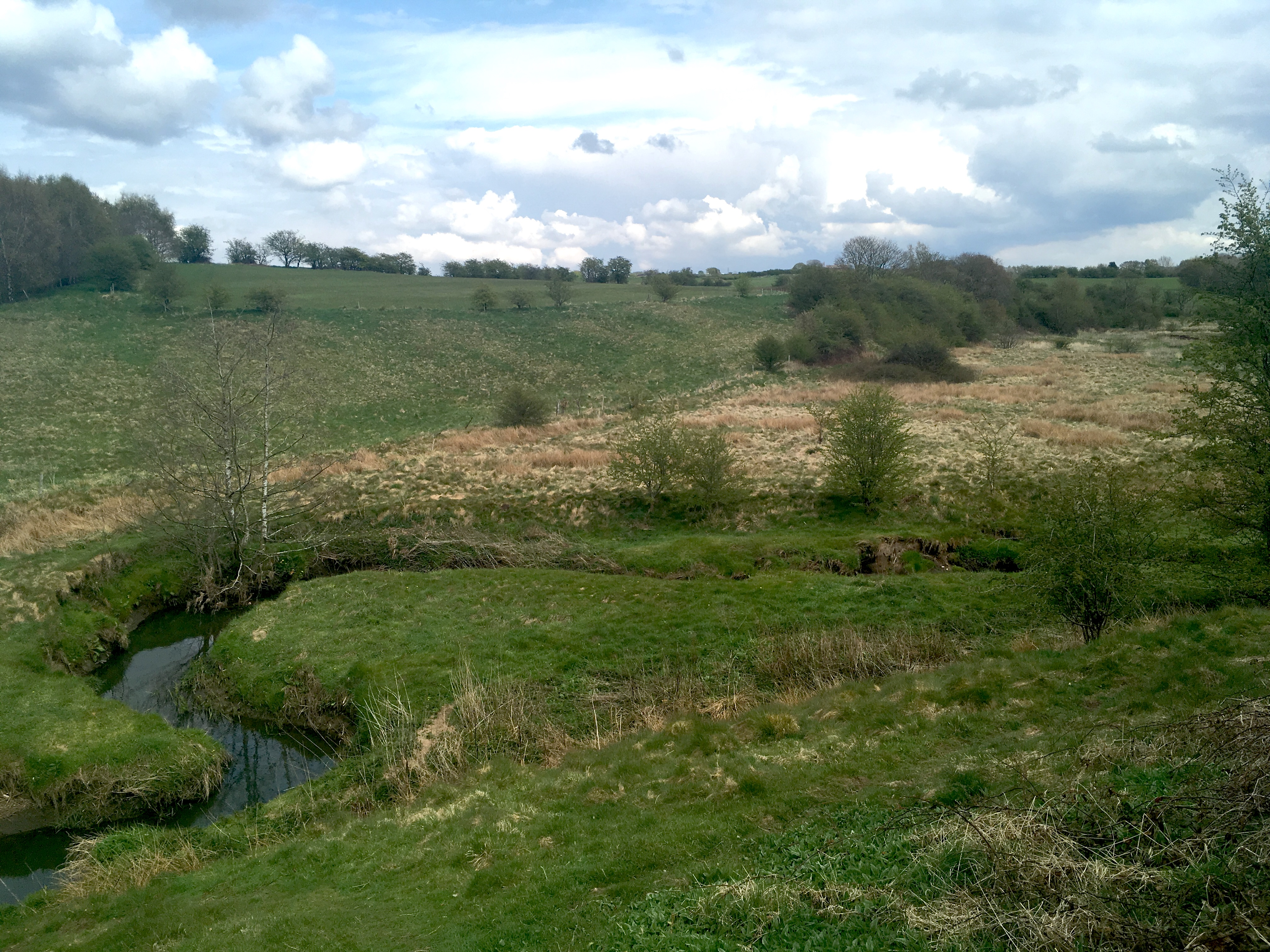

Location
- Country: England

Physical characteristics
- Source
  - location: Middledon
- Mouth
  - location: River Roch, Unsworth
  - coordinates: 53°34′17.35″N 2°17′25.82″W

Whittle Brook is a watercourse in Greater Manchester and a tributary of the River Roch, classified as a main river. It originates in the outskirts of Middleton, and extends to Hollins Vale Nature Reserve in Unsworth, flowing South East to North West. The brook runs through predominantly agricultural lands, and several woodland blocks are maintained along its course, which together make up Unsworth Moss. Whittle Brook forms part of the habitat for farmland birds as well as great crested newt and barn owl.

== History ==
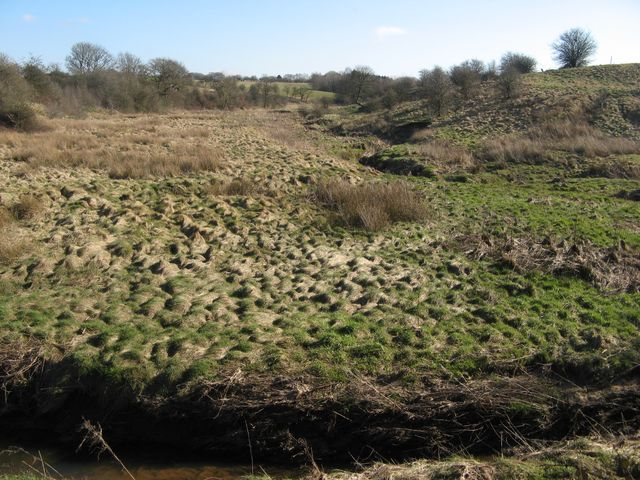
The brook's meanders as it cuts through Unsworth Moss

Whittle Brook runs through a historically agricultural area, though has come into further contact with human settlement following the suburbanisation of its vicinity. The earliest part of its history was suggested in 1984 when an archeological investigation concluded that there may have an iron smelting site on the banks of the brook. While not conclusive, the investigation explored the possibility of a regionally significant medieval bloomery that used the brook as a water source.

In 1997, a further field walking investigation along the brook reiterated the suggestion of a medieval settlement around Whittle Brook. A 2021 report by the Greater Manchester Combined Authority suggested that the site may be of regional importance, and recommended a survey into the extent of the iron smelting site before scheduling could be considered.

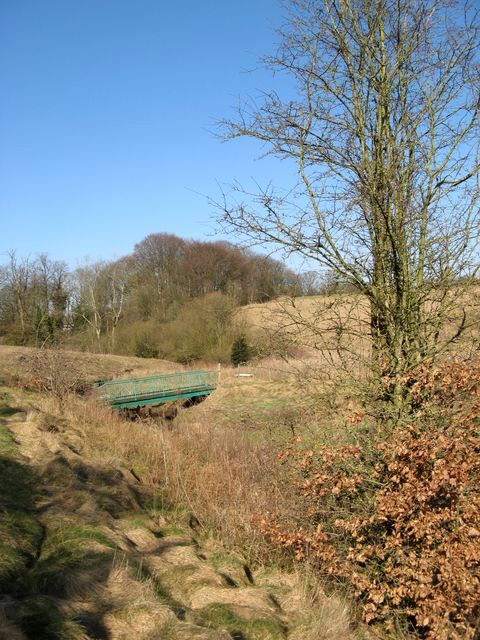
A public footbridge over the brook, part of the Whittle Brook walking area

== Landscape ==
Whittle Brook flows north west through Unsworth Moss, forming the wetland conditions which have caused peat to form around its bank. The brook is a defining feature of the undulating landscape of the moss, through which it meanders before reaching Hollins Brook in the north west of the moss. In a 2021 report, the Greater Manchester Combined Authority stated that the 'u-shaped valleys of the brook and associated vegetation form pleasant characteristic features in the landscape.' Because of the waterway's importance in the surrounding landscape, the Authority has proposed adding Hollins Brook to join the neighbouring green belt, and further restore the waterways and its banks, including the restoration of surrounding peat, the management of invasive species, and the formation of a riparian zone.

== Flooding Risk ==
Along Whittle Brook and its banks localised risk of groundwater flooding in the area around the waterway due to the areas of peat that surround it. Several areas along the banks watercourse have a significant risk of flooding (1 in 100 annually) and because of this development is restricted within 8 meters of the bank across its length. Plans are in place for to create a riparian buffer zone by planting trees which delay the timing of peat runoff and lessen the flooding risks; these plans form part of the green infrastructure strategy for the Whittle Brook area.

== Walking Area ==
Several public footpaths and walking trails cross over Whittle Brook and the areas around it; Bury Council maintains two footbridges in the north-eastern area of the brook, which are used by walkers to access Unsworth Moss (the nearby farmland, woodland, and valleys the brook runs through). The Whittle Brook walking area can be accessed by the footpath entrance on Castle Road, near the brook’s confluence with Hollins Brook.

== Tributaries ==
- Brightley Brook
- Hollins Brook
  - Castle Brook
  - Langley Brook

Next confluence upstream	River Roch	Next confluence downstream
Hollins Brook	Whittle Brook	Langley Brook
