= Greenvale Brook =

Location
- Country: England

Physical characteristics
- Source
  - location: Lydgate
- Mouth
  - location: River Roch, Calderbrook
  - coordinates: 53°39′05.31″N 2°05′16.40″W

Greenvale Brook is a watercourse in Greater Manchester and a tributary of the River Roch.

== Tributaries ==
- Lydgate Brook
- Castle Brook
- Red Brook
- Lead Mine Brook

Next confluence upstream	River Roch	Next confluence downstream
Chelburn Brook	Greenvale Brook	Town House Brook
