= Parr Brook =

Stream in Greater Manchester, England

Location
- Country: England

Physical characteristics
- Source
  - location: Unsworth
- Mouth
  - location: River Roch, Blackford Bridge
  - coordinates: 53°33′54.61″N 2°17′35.54″W

Parr Brook is a watercourse in Greater Manchester and a tributary of the River Roch. It originates in Unsworth and flows through Bury Golf Club before joining the River Roch at Blackford Bridge.

Next confluence upstream	River Roch	Next confluence downstream
Hollins Brook	Parr Brook	-
