= Sudden Brook =

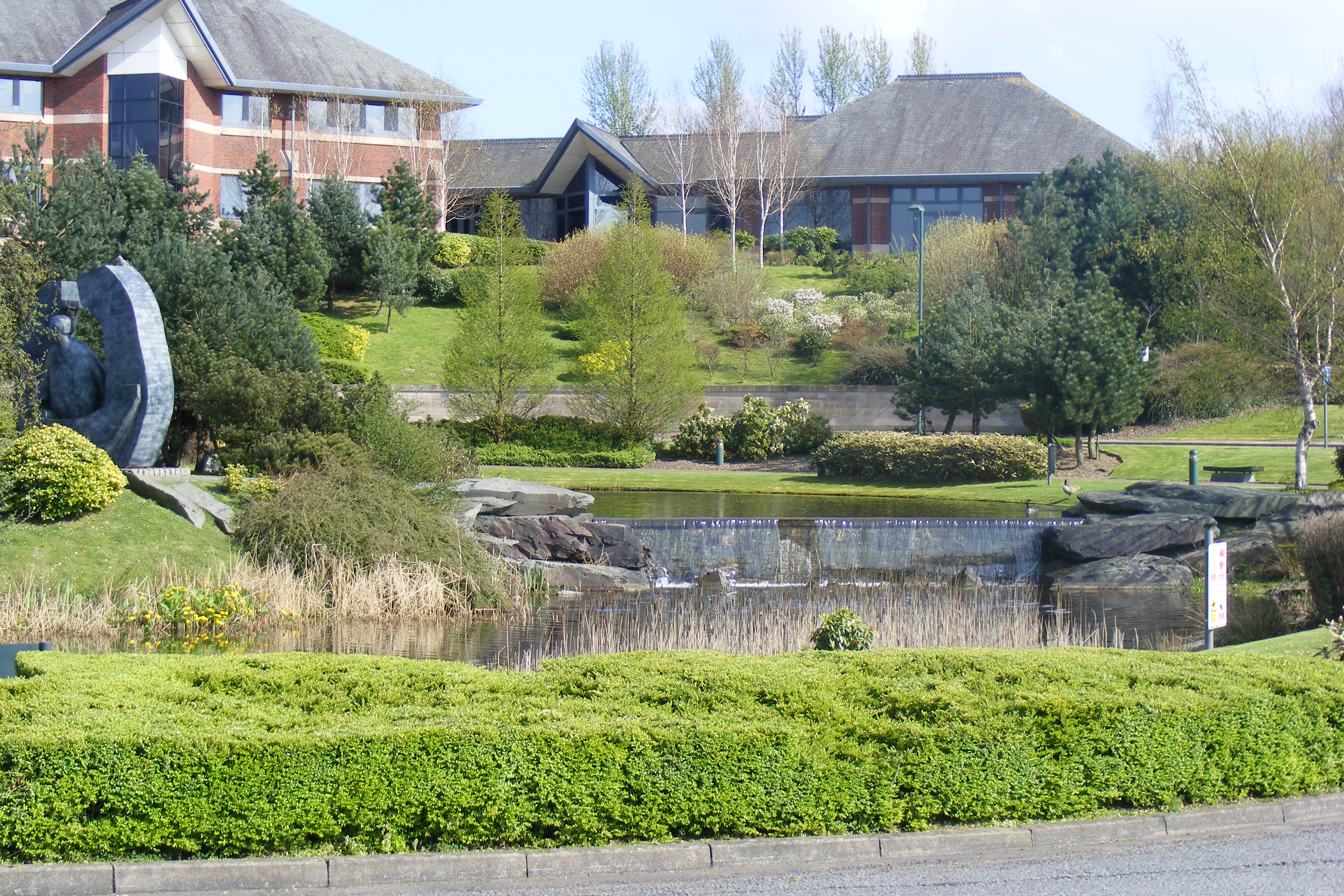
- Sandbrook Park

Location
- Country: England

Physical characteristics
- Source
  - location: Royton
- Mouth
  - location: River Roch, Sudden
  - coordinates: 53°36′25.10″N 2°10′46.78″W

Sudden Brook is a watercourse in Greater Manchester and a tributary of the River Roch. It originates in to the north of Royton, Oldham and flows Northwards through Kirkholt and Sandbrook Park to join the River Roch at Sudden.

== Tributaries ==
- Rhodes Brook ?
- Turf Hill Brook ?
- Buersil Brook ?

Also flows from well'ith lane to the old Ashfield valley across the bottom (south) of "The P streets" -Phillip St to Pullman St where it is known as Jackie Brook.

Next confluence upstream	River Roch	Next confluence downstream
River Spodden	Sudden Brook	Millers Brook
