= Hollins Brook =

Stream in Greater Manchester, England

Location
- Country: England

Physical characteristics
- Source
  - location: Unsworth
- Mouth
  - location: River Roch, Hollins
  - coordinates: 53°34′17.35″N 2°17′25.82″W

Hollins Brook is a watercourse in Greater Manchester and a tributary of the River Roch. It originates in Unsworth and is one of the habitats that makes up Hollins Vale Nature Reserve.

== Tributaries ==
- Brightley Brook
- Whittle Brook
  - Castle Brook
  - Langley Brook

| Next confluence upstream | River Roch | Next confluence downstream |
| Tack Lee Brook | Hollins Brook | Parr Brook |
