= Stanney Brook =

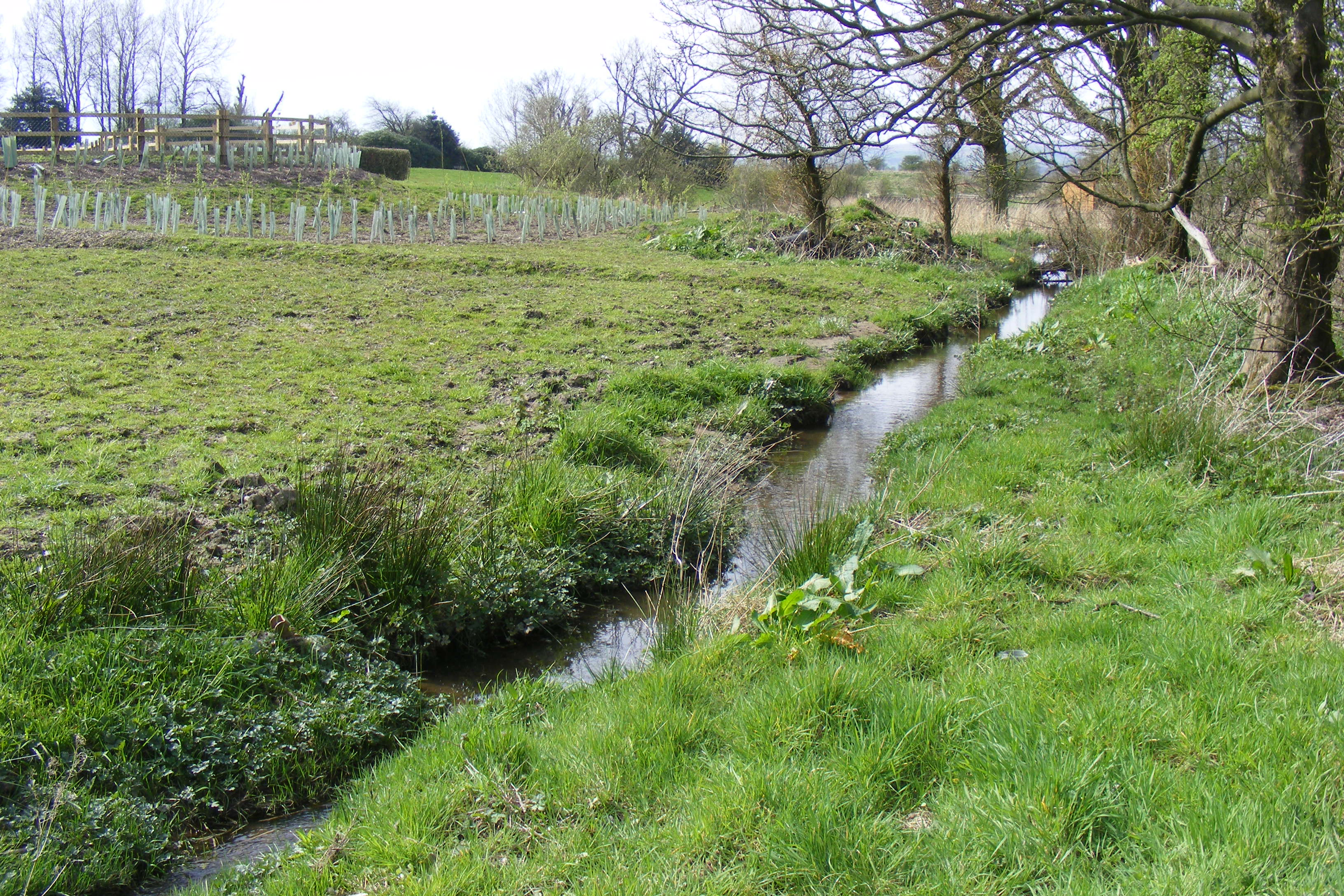

Location
- Country: England

Physical characteristics
- Source
  - location: Burnedge, Shaw and Crompton, Greater Manchester, England
- Mouth
  - location: River Roch, Newbold Brow, Rochdale, Greater Manchester, England
  - coordinates: 53°37′14.79″N 2°8′25.86″W

Stanney Brook is a watercourse in Greater Manchester, England. It originates in the Burnedge area of Shaw and Crompton, and flows through Milnrow into Rochdale before joining the River Roch at Newbold Brow. Alone among the watercourses of Milnrow and Newhey, it does not pass through the centre of either village, and flows directly into the River Roch, rather than first into the River Beal. Its name derives from the Lancashire dialect word "stanner", a ridge of stones. It is also unusual in that the borough in which it rises, changes, depending on the wetness of surrounding moorland. The brook drops 100 metres in a little over 5.5 kilometres, or 330feet in 3.5 miles. It is culverted four times, generally is only 60 cm (2 ft) wide, and rarely exceeds 90 cm (3 ft) in width at any point.

== Sources ==
The source of the brook, when the moorland is wet, is 200m south of Burnedge Lane, High Crompton, in Oldham Metropolitan Borough. When the moorland is dry, the first sign of the brook is from the Burnedge Lane bridge, looking north into the brook's clough, in Rochdale Metropolitan Borough. The brook then runs past Knott Booth and Dig Gate farms to its first culvert, beneath the M62 motorway.

== North of M62 Motorway ==
North of the M62, the brook drops down a cascade of 17 concrete steps, including a 100degree bend, beneath Sir Isaac Newton Way, in the Kingsway Business Park, near the head of Ashfield Lane, Milnrow, and supplies a mere south of the eponymous Stanney Brook park, into which it proceeds to form the eastern boundary. It then flows across private land in the Business Park, where there is a triple-discrete arch-underbridge under Michael Faraday Avenue, with one arch for the brook, and one each for two land drains flowing into the brook after the underbridge. It then flows across to, and under, the Manchester-Rochdale Metrolink (formerly train) line, just north of the Kingsway Business Park stop. Its narrow meandering path can be clearly seen from both sides of a Metrolink tram, from which the triple arch underbridge may also be glimpsed. The brook then disappears into a long culvert beneath the Rochdale Canal, Kingsway Retail Park and the junction of Kingsway and Milnrow Road. It emerges to form the northern boundary of Jubilee Park, a narrow Forestry Commission park. The brook proceeds past Belfield Lodge into a deep clough to the north of Belfield Lane, Rochdale, from where it is again culverted beneath what was once a factory. It emerges close to Croxton Avenue, Newbold Brow, and traverses Roch Wood to join the River Roch, beside a footbridge from Gowers Street, Hamer, Rochdale.

Next confluence upstream	River Roch	Next confluence downstream
River Beal	Stanney Brook	Hey Brook
