= Naden Brook =

River in North-West England

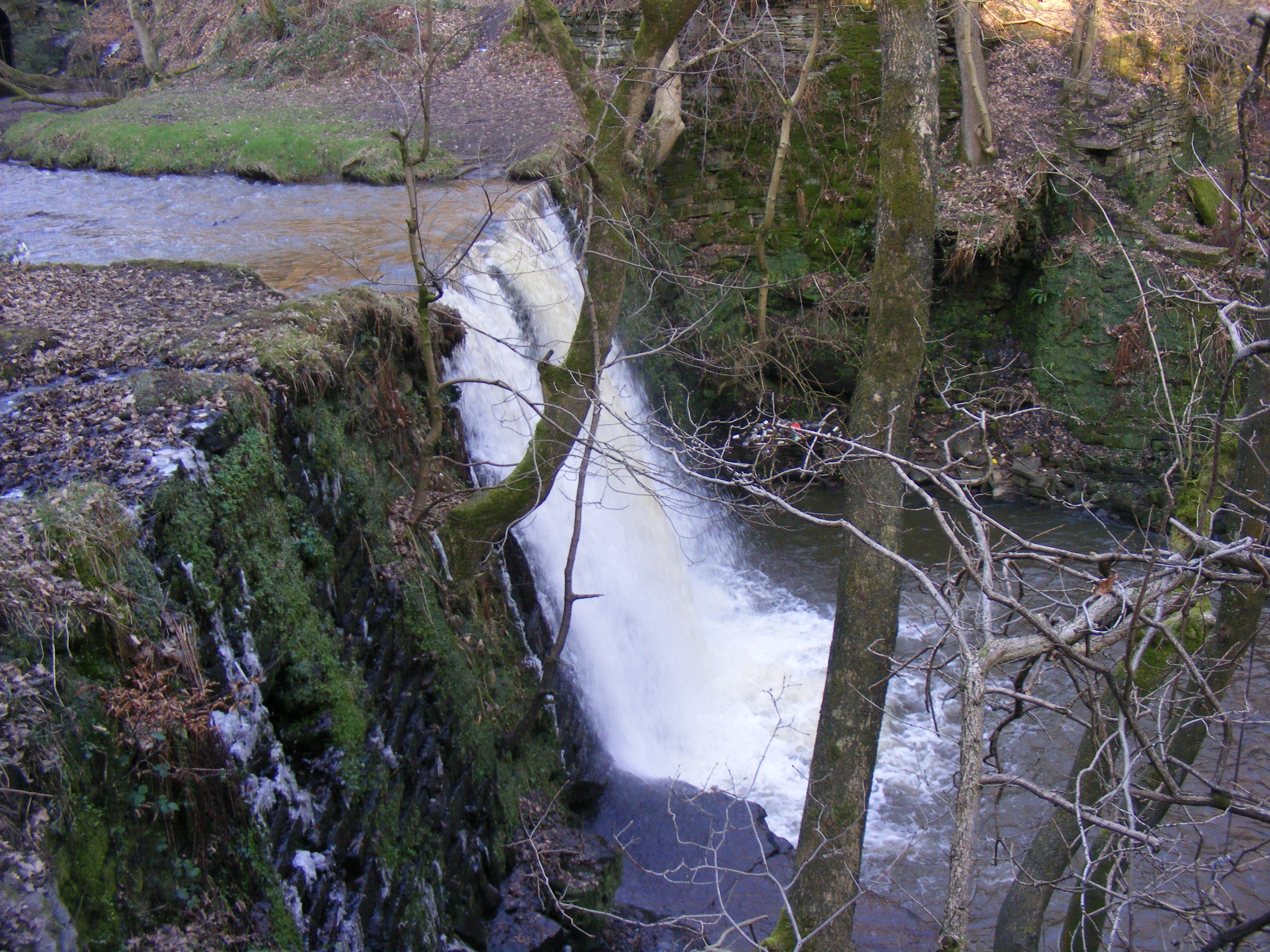
- Waterfall at Carr Wood

Location
- Country: England

Physical characteristics
- Source
  - location: Hail Storm Hill
- Mouth
  - location: River Roch, Heywood
  - coordinates: 53°36′12.85″N 2°13′38.30″W

Naden Brook is a watercourse in northwest England. It rises in the hills above Norden, near the boundary of Lancashire and Greater Manchester. From here it flows south for 21 kilometres (13 mi) to Heywood, where it merges with the River Roch.

== Tributaries ==
- Cheesden Brook
  - Kill Gate Brook
  - Grain Brook
- Mill Croft Brook
  - Old House Brook
- Woodhouse Lane Brook
- Royds Brook
  - Red Lumb Brook
- Fordoe Brook
- Rooley Moor Brook
- Birchen Holts Brook
- Ding Brook

Next confluence upstream	River Roch	Next confluence downstream
Millers Brook	Naden Brook	Wrigley Brook
