= Heap, Bury =

Coordinates: 53.60°N 2.25°W

Heap
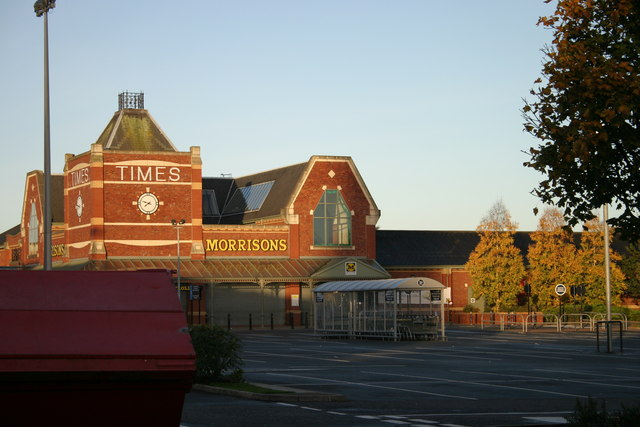

- Location within Greater Manchester
- Metropolitan borough: Bury
- Metropolitan county: Greater Manchester
- Region: North West
- Country: England
- Sovereign state: United Kingdom
- Police: Greater Manchester
- Fire: Greater Manchester
- Ambulance: North West

Heap was an area of Bury, in the county of Lancashire (now Greater Manchester), England. Most of the township was on the south bank of the River Roch.

== History ==
Heap was formerly a township in the parish of Bury, in 1866 Heap became a separate civil parish, in 1894 the parish was abolished to form Heywood and Unsworth, part also went to Bury and Birtle cum Bamford. In 1891 the parish had a population of 17,208.
