= River Roch =

River in Greater Manchester, England

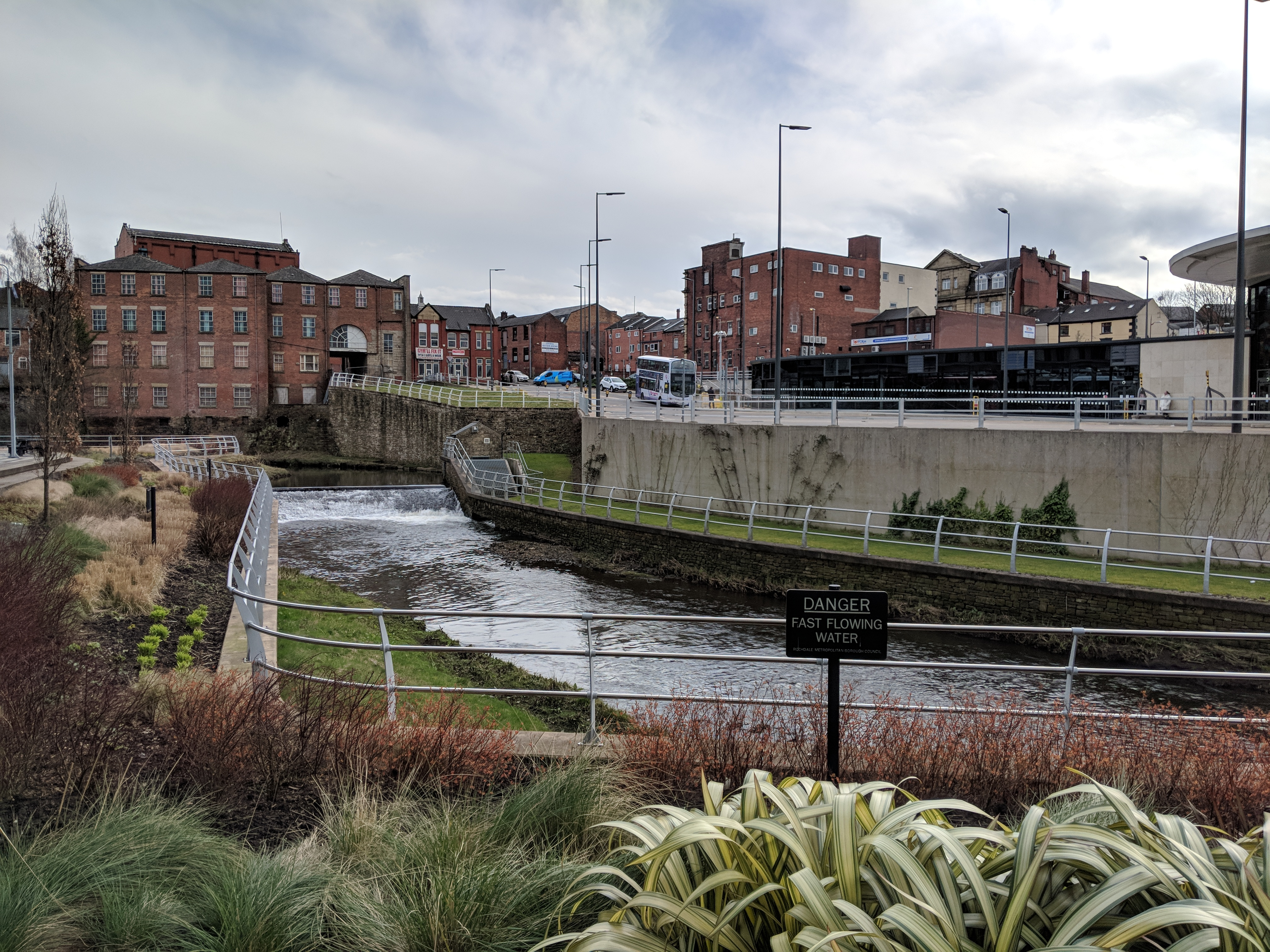
- Flowing in front of Rochdale Interchange and Number One Riverside

Location
- Country: England
- District: Littleborough, Rochdale, Heywood, Bury

Physical characteristics
- Source
  - location: Chelburn Moor
- Mouth
  - location: River Irwell, Radcliffe
  - coordinates: 53°33′43.95″N 2°18′2.65″W
- Length: 100 m (330 ft)

Basin features
- Tributaries
  - left: Tack Lee Brook, Naden Brook, River Spodden, Hey Brook, Ash Brook, Featherstall Brook, Town House Brook
  - right: Parr Brook, Hollins Brook, Wrigley Brook, Millers Brook, Sudden Brook, Moss Brook, Stanney Brook, River Beal, Ealees Brook, Greenvale Brook, Chelburn Brook

The River Roch /ˈroʊtʃ/ is a river in Greater Manchester in North West England, a tributary of the River Irwell.

== Course ==
Rising on Chelburn Moor (south of Todmorden in the Pennines), the river flows south through Littleborough towards Rochdale where it is joined by the River Beal at Belfield, and the River Spodden from Whitworth. Turning west it runs past Heywood and Bury before meeting the River Irwell at Springwater Park, located just to the east of Radcliffe.

== Etymology ==
The town of Rochdale is recorded as Recedham in the Domesday Book and Rachetham in 1193, with variations of Rechedham continuing into the thirteenth century. It is thought that these names represent a pre-existing Brittonic name for the river Roch, borrowed into Old English for the name of the settlement.

The early forms of Rachet-ham and Reched-ham suggest a compound of two elements, ro-ced or ro-cet. The first element is either from the common intensive prefix rö- (Modern Welsh rhy-, Cornish re-) meaning "great" and found in other river names such as the Ribble and the Rother or rag-, (Modern Welsh ar-) meaning "opposite" or "adjacent to". The second element would then almost certainly be cę:d or cet, (Modern Welsh coed) meaning "wood". This would give the name a meaning of "River of the great wood" or "River opposite the wood".

Another etymology focused on the early forms similarities to Rheged, the Cumbric-speaking kingdom in North West England during the Middle Ages. Although this etymology is used to support the theory that the Roch may have been the centre of a separate kingdom known in Medieval Welsh literature as "South Rheged" or "Argoed" (opposite the wood), it remains unproven as the kingdom of Rheged's boundaries have not been identified. A further suggestion is that the name "rheged" simply means "area" in the Cumbric language (related to Regio in Latin and Region in Modern English) and that the kingdom of Rheged and the river merely shared a common Celtic name.

Although Rochdale is pronounced /ˈrɒtʃdeɪl/ (with a shorter o sound), the name of the river is still pronounced /roʊtʃ/ (with a long vowel sound).

== Later history ==
The river has been culverted in Rochdale town centre since the early 20th century. This was built by the joining together of seven bridges to form one large bridge, making it one of the widest bridges in the world. Maintenance work was carried out on the bridge in the 1990s and the river was uncovered temporarily. In 2015 work began on opening the bridge again in a multimillion-pound project. On Boxing Day 2015, following heavy rain, the Roch burst its banks causing flooding in the town centre.

== Tributaries ==
Moving upstream from the Irwell confluence, the tributaries include the following:

- Parr Brook
- Hollins Brook
  - Whittle Brook
- Gigg Brook
- Barn Brook
  - Green Brook
  - Gipsy Brook
- Tack Lee Brook
- Wrigley Brook
- Naden Brook
- Plumpton Wood Brook
- Millers Brook
- Primrose Hill Brook
- Sudden Brook
- River Spodden
- Moss Brook
- Hey Brook
- Stanney Brook
- River Beal
- Ash Brook
- Clegg Hall Brook
- Wuerdle Brook
- Stubley Brook
- Featherstall Brook
- Ealees Brook
- Town House Brook
- Greenvale Brook
- Chelburn Brook

== Gallery ==
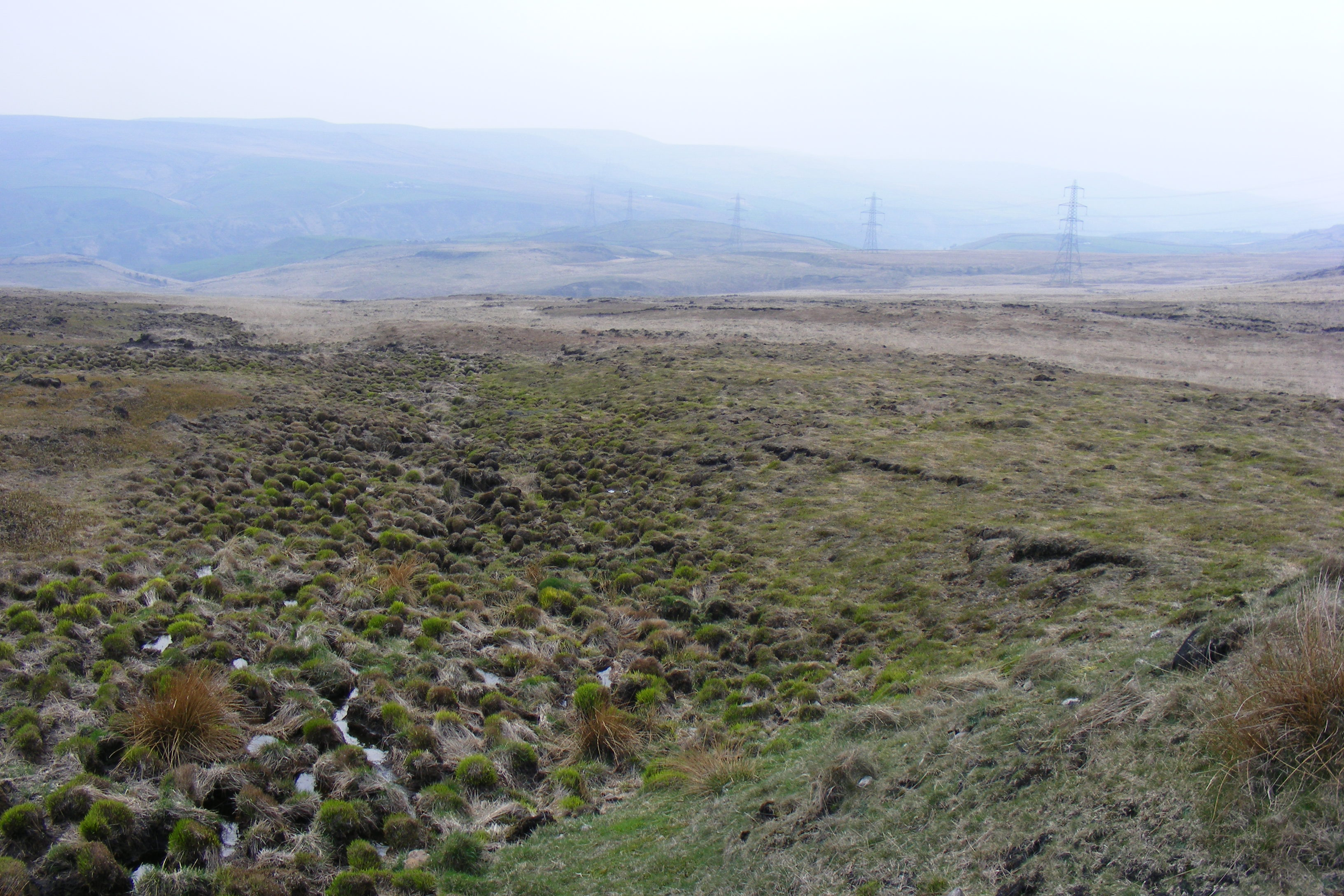
The source on Chelburn Moor

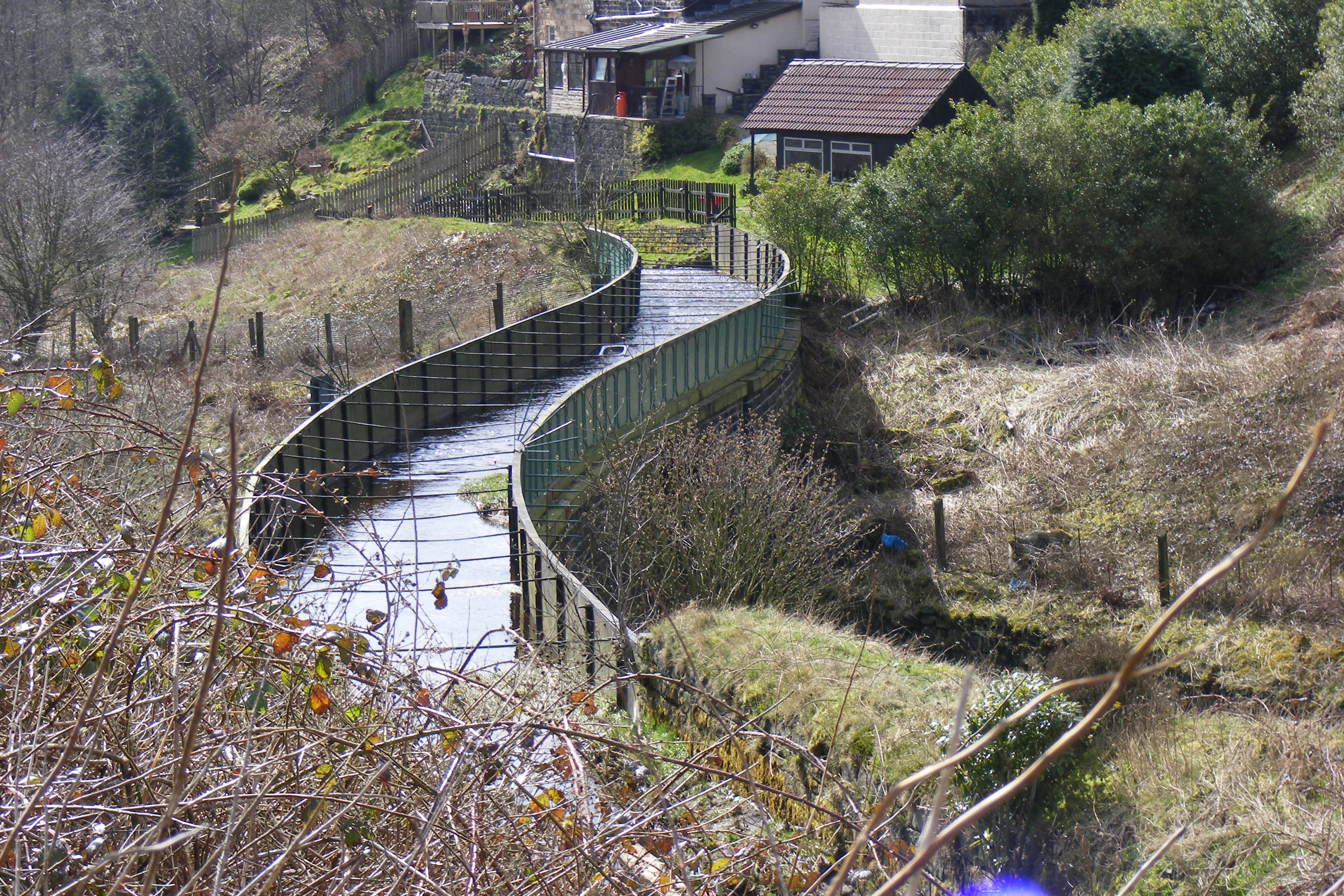
Aqueduct across the Caldervale Railway

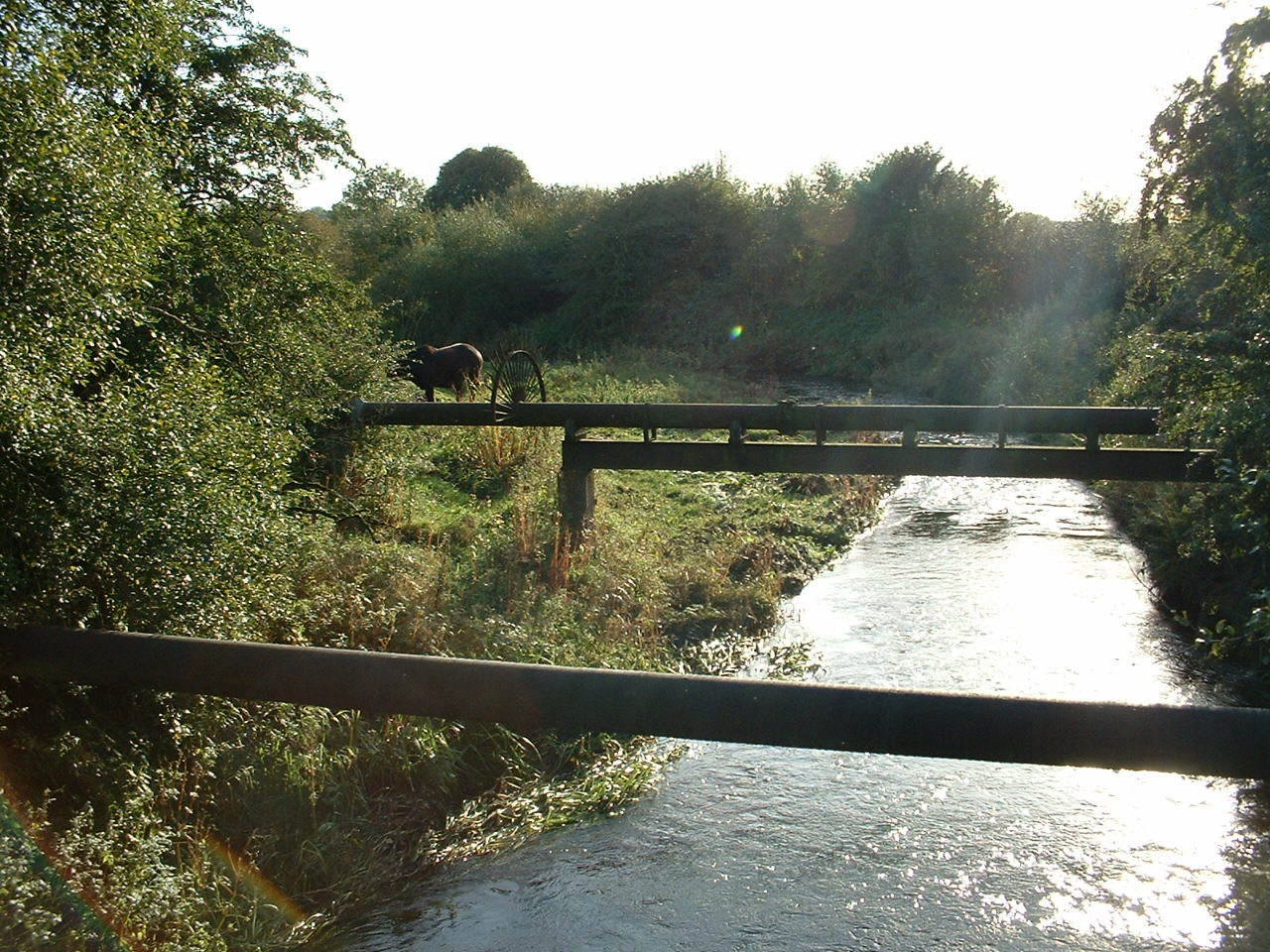
Looking downstream from Smallbridge

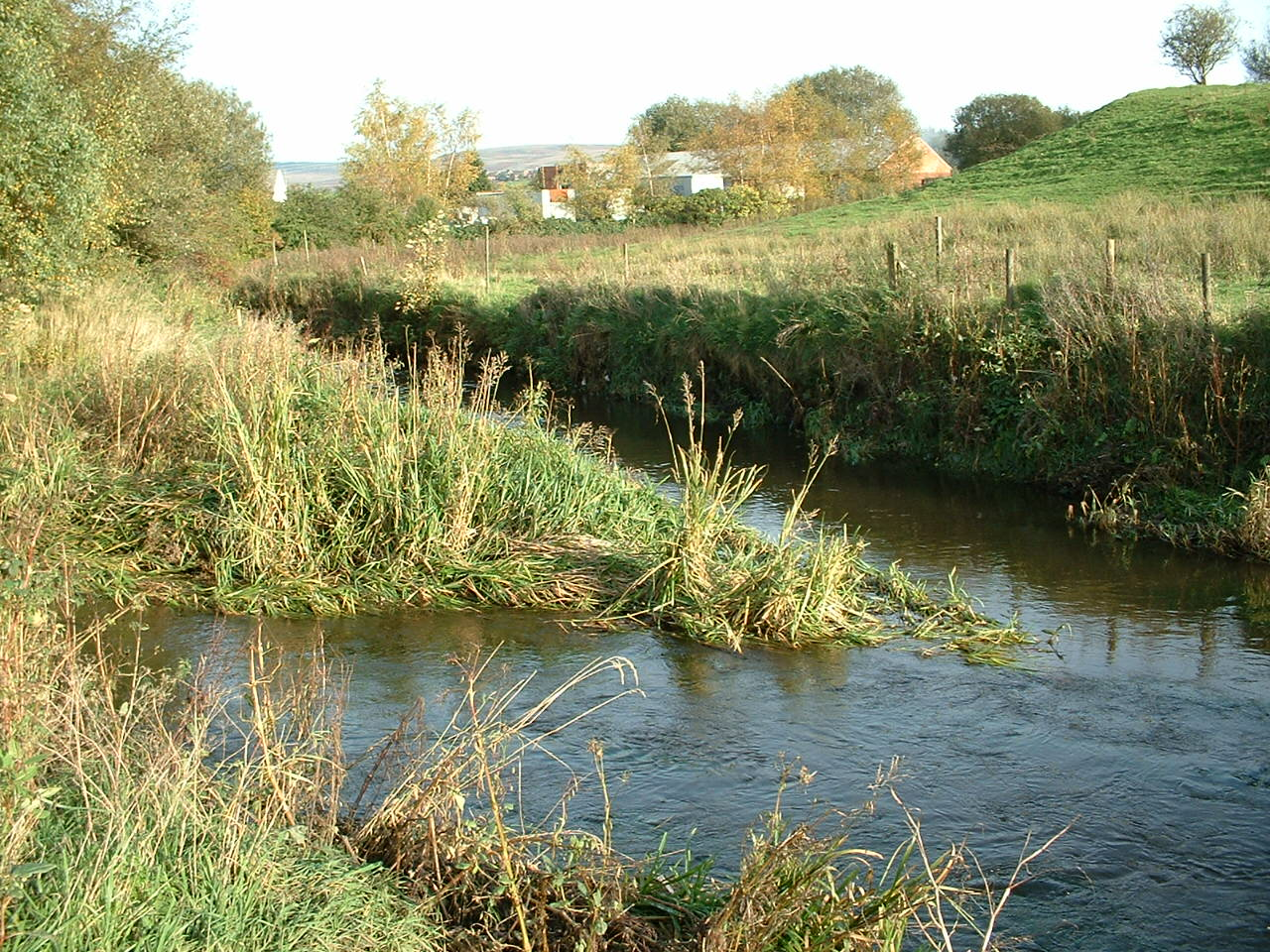
Confluence of River Beal

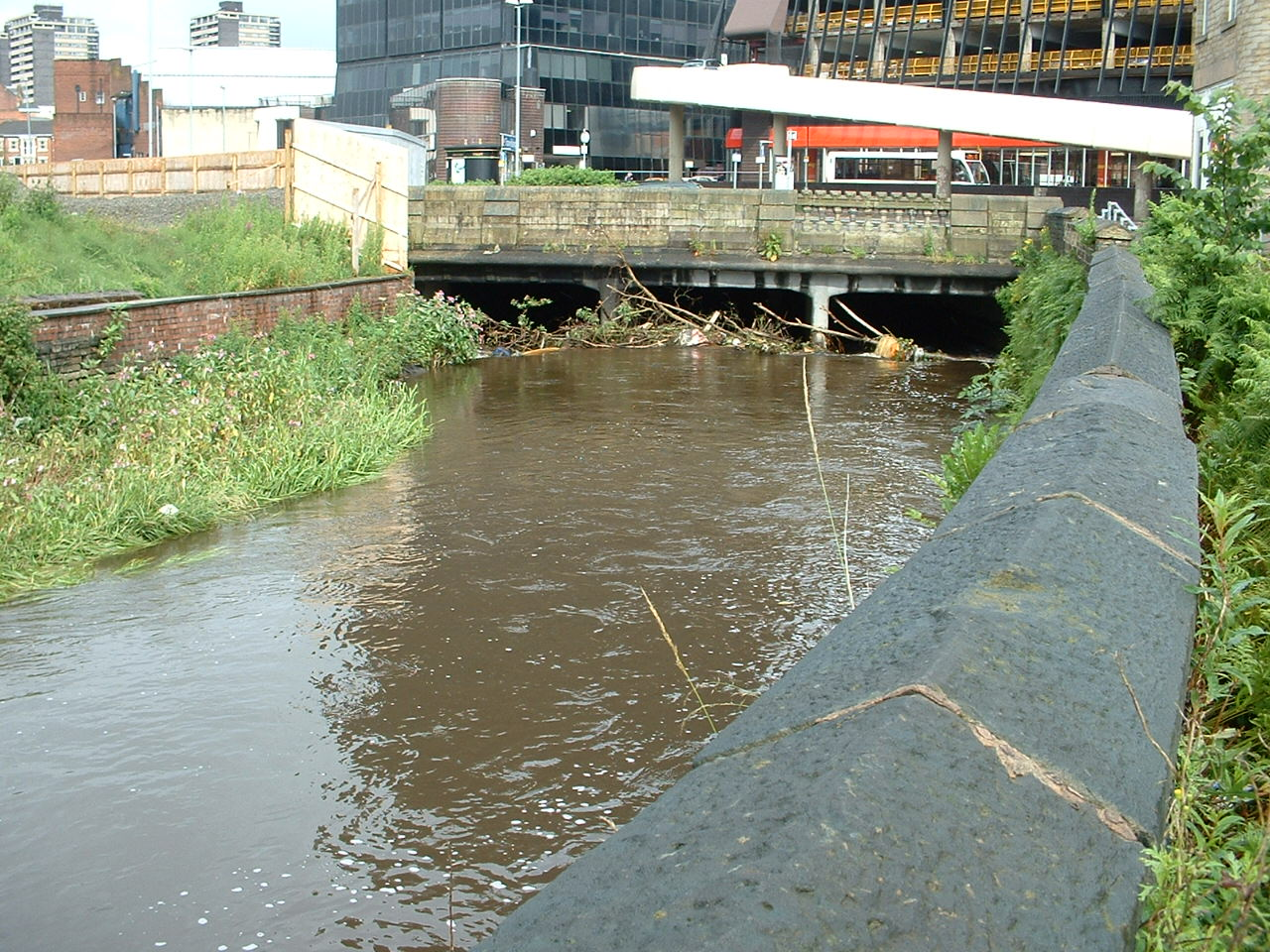
Flowing under one of the world's widest bridges

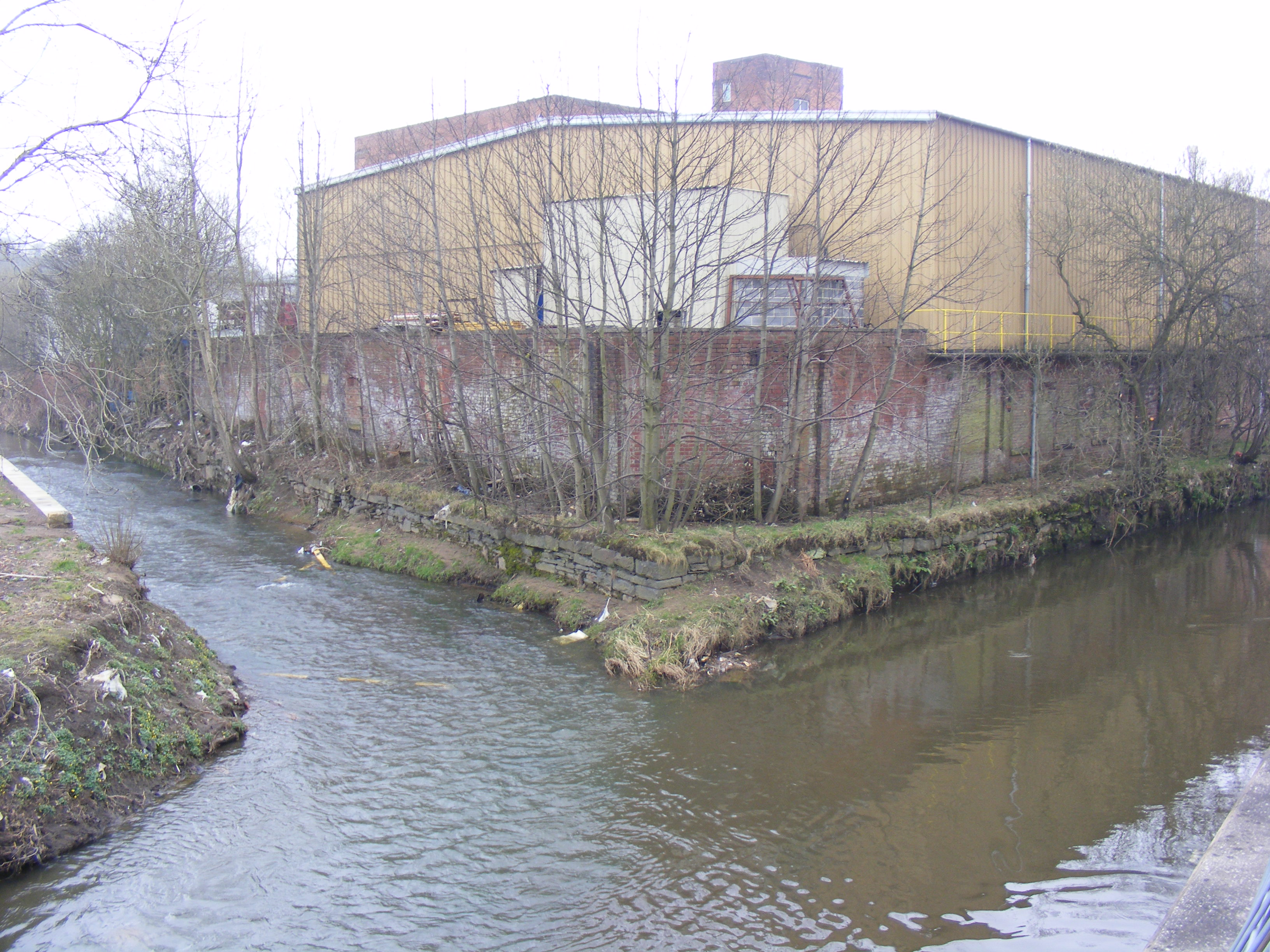
Confluence of River Spodden

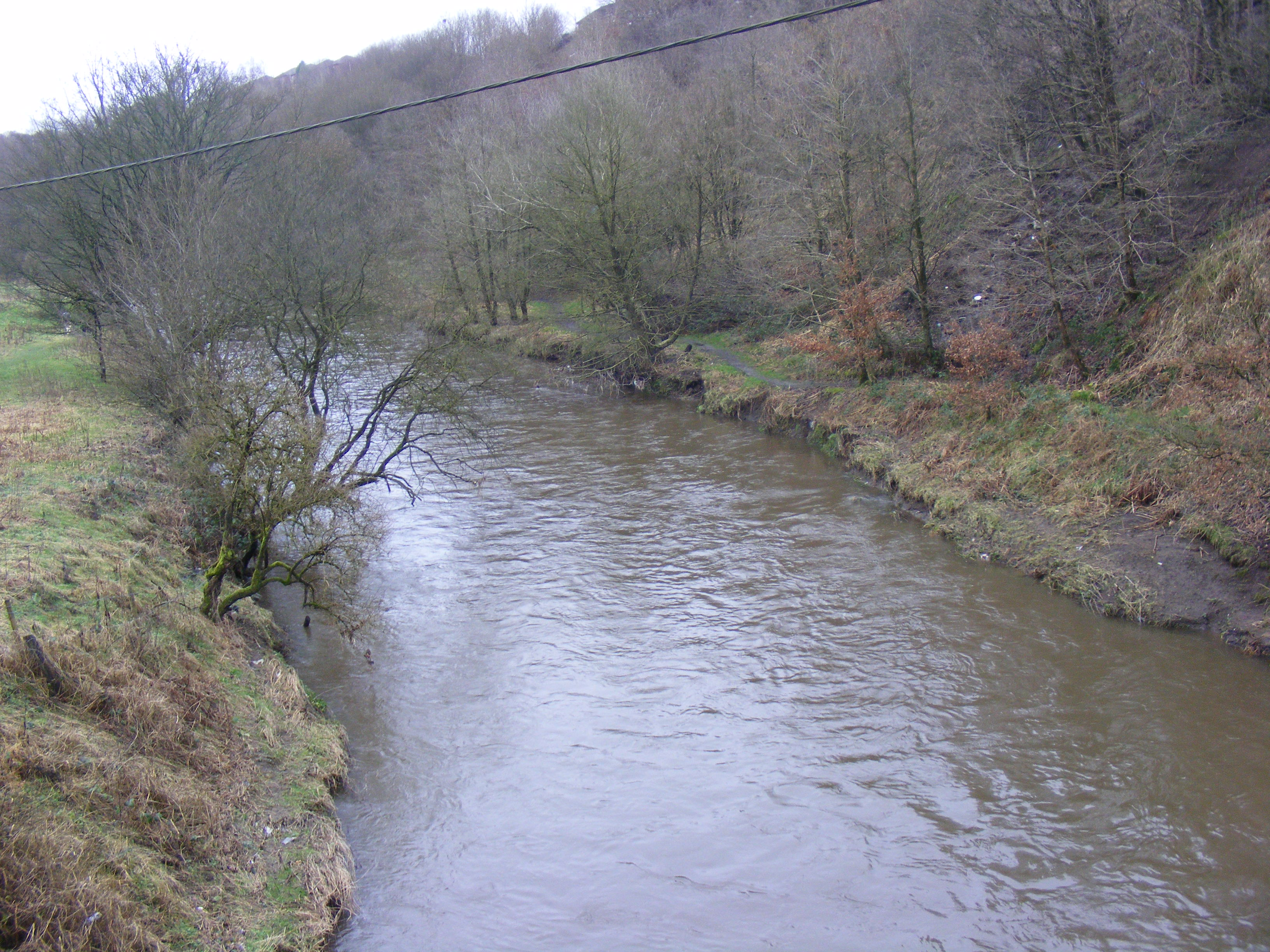
Upstream from Bottom o' th' Brow, Heywood

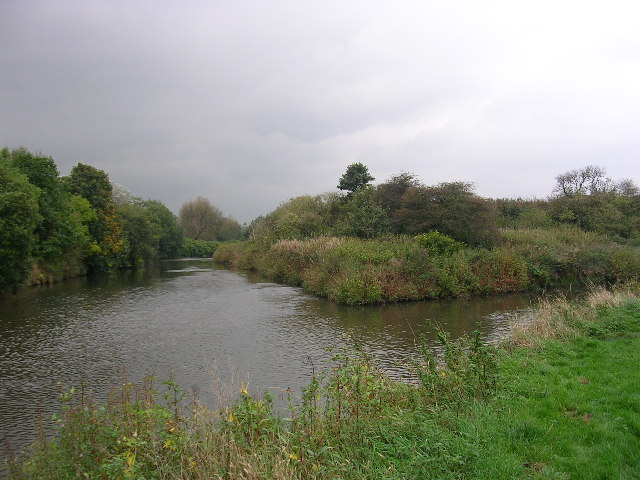
Confluence with River Irwell

| Next confluence upstream | River Irwell | Next confluence downstream |
| Woodhill / Kirklees Brook (West) | River Roch | River Croal (West) |
