= Barrage Balloon Organisations of the Royal Auxiliary Air Force =

List of Balloon Organisations

This is a list of Barrage Balloon Organisations of the Royal Auxiliary Air Force formed shortly before and during the Second World War. As the AAF was 'embodied' with the RAF on the outbreak of war when the AAF stopped recruiting, all balloon squadron numbered 900 to 947 were AAF and from 948 to 999 were RAF.

== Groups ==
data from:-

Group	Formed	Formed At	Disbanded	Disbanded At	Notes	Fate
No. 30 (Balloon Barrage) Group AAF	17 Mar 1937		7 Jan 1945		London / Hook	
No. 31 (Balloon Barrage) Group AAF	1 Apr 1939		13 Nov 1941		London / Birmingham	
No. 32 (Balloon Barrage) Group AAF					London / Portsmouth / Romsey / Claverton	
No. 33 (Balloon Barrage) Group AAF	1 Mar 1939		4 Sep 1944		London / Newcastle upon Tyne / Kingston upon Hull / Sheffield	
No. 34 (Balloon Barrage) Group AAF	1 Jul 1940		4 Sep 1944		Newcastle / Edinburgh	

== Centres ==
Centre	Formed	Formed At	Disbanded	Disbanded At	Notes	Fate
No. 1 Balloon Centre	4 Oct 1937		31 Mar 1945		Kidbrooke, London SE3	
No. 2 Balloon Centre	4 Aug 1938		4 Oct 1941		Hook, Surrey	
No. 3 Balloon Centre	15 Dec 1938		15 Mar 1945		Stanmore, Middlesex	
No. 4 Balloon Centre	2 Aug 1938		1 Apr 1943		Chigwell, Essex	
No. 22 Balloon Centre	19 Feb 1944		20 Nov 1944		Biggin Hill, Kent	
No. 23 Balloon Centre	1 Feb 1944		15 Jan 1945		Gravesend, Kent	
No. 24 Balloon Centre	1 Jul 1944		15 Jan 1945		Redhill, Surrey	
No. 5 Balloon Centre			Jun 1944		Whitehouse Common, Sutton Coldfield, Birmingham	
No. 6 Balloon Centre					Wythall, Birmingham, Transferred to No 32 Group13 Nov 1941	
No. 7 Balloon Centre			Jun 1944		Curzon Lane, Alvaston, Derbyshire	
No. 8 Balloon Centre			Jun 1944		Fazakerley, Liverpool	
No. 9 Balloon Centre			Jun 1944		Houghton Green, Warrington	
No. 10 Balloon Centre			Jun 1944		Bowlee, Middleton, Greater Manchester	
No. 11 Balloon Centre					Pucklechurch, Bristol	
No. 12 Balloon Centre					Southampton Road, Titchfield, Fareham, Hants, Transferred to No. 30 Group AAF - pre Jun 1944	
No. 13 Balloon Centre					Collaton Cross, Yealmpton, Plymouth	
No. 14 Balloon Centre			Jun 1944		Caerau, Ely, Cardiff	
No. 21 Balloon Centre	27 Aug 1940		31 Dec 1941		Pembroke Dock, Wales	
No. 15 Balloon Centre					Long Benton, Forest Hall, Newcastle-upon-Tyne	
No. 16 Balloon Centre	15 Aug 1939		Jun 1944		Hemsworth, Norton, Sheffield	
No. 17 Balloon Centre	17 May 1939		15 Oct 1942		Royal Air Force Sutton-on-Hull, Hull	
No. 18 Balloon Centre	Aug 1939				Bishopbriggs, Glasgow	
No. 19 Balloon Centre	21 Oct 1939		6 May 1940		Rosyth, Fife	
No. 18 Balloon Centre	2 Jun 1940		27 Dec 1941		Lyness, Orkney	

== Squadrons ==
Balloon Squadron	Formed	Formed At	Disbanded	Disbanded At	Notes	Fate
No. 901 (County of London) Balloon Squadron AAF	16 May 1938				5 Flights of 9 balloons Woolwich, Abbey Wood, Kidbrooke	
No. 902 (County of London) Balloon Squadron AAF	16 May 1938				5 Flights of 9 balloons Kidbrooke, Brixton	
No. 903 (County of London) Balloon Squadron AAF	16 May 1938		1944		5 Flights of 9 balloons. Amalgamated with 902 Sqn.Brixton / Forest Hill	
No. 904 (County of Surrey) Balloon Squadron AAF	16 May 1938				5 Flights of 9 balloons Clapham	
No. 905 (County of Surrey) Balloon Squadron AAF	16 May 1938		1944		5 Flights of 9 balloons. Amalgamated with 901 Sqn Kensington, Clapham	
No. 906 (County of Middlesex) Balloon Squadron AAF	7 Jul 1938				5 Flights of 9 balloons Hampstead, Kensington	
No. 907 (County of Middlesex) Balloon Squadron AAF	16 May 1938				5 Flights of 9 balloons Harringay / Woodberry Down	
No. 908 (County of Essex) Balloon Squadron AAF	5 Jul 1938				5 Flights of 9 balloons Wanstead, Harringay	
No. 909 (County of Essex) Balloon Squadron AAF	16 May 1938				5 Flights of 9 balloons West Ham, East Ham	
No. 910 (County of Essex) Balloon Squadron AAF	5 Jul 1938				5 Flights of 9 balloons, (3 Water-borne (Aug 1940)) Dagenham, East Ham.	
No. 911 (County of Warwick) Balloon Squadron AAF	Jan 1939				4 Flights of 8 balloons (48 balloons in Aug 1940) West Bromwich, Chelmsford, Erdington (Dec 1943).	
No. 912 (County of Warwick) Balloon Squadron AAF	23 Jan 1939 -	Birmingham	12 July 1944	Brockworth	Squadron HQ Aug 1939 No 5 Balloon Centre, Sutton Coldfield, Operated in Bolougne with 2 flights 15/2/1940 to 23/5/1940 on evacuation based at Cardington and moved to Brockworth, Gloucester on 26/4/1940 with 3 flights flying 24 balloons from 30 June 1940. On disbandment replaced by 912 Squadron Care and Maintenance Party	
No. 913 (County of Warwick) Balloon Squadron AAF	Jan 1939 -				3 Flights of 8 balloons Erdington / Sutton Coldfield, Chelmsford	
No. 914 (County of Warwick) Balloon Squadron AAF	Jan 1939		Jun 1944		4 Flights of 8 balloons (40 balloons in Aug 1940) Wythall / Northfield.	
No. 915 (County of Warwick) Balloon Squadron AAF	Jan 1939				4 Flights of 8 balloons (40 balloons in Aug 1940) Bourneville / Rowkeath, Chelmsford.	
No. 916 (County of Warwick) Balloon Squadron AAF	Jan 1939		Jun 1944		3 Flights of 8 balloons (32 balloons in Aug 1940) Coventry Reformed for Anti-'Diver' duties	
No. 917 (County of Warwick) Balloon Squadron AAF	Jan 1939		Jun 1944		3 Flights of 8 balloons Coventry	
No. 918 (County of Derby) Balloon Squadron AAF	Jan 1939		Jun 1944		3 Flights of 8 balloons ( 32 balloons in Aug 1940) Derby / Alveston.	
No. 919 (West Lancashire) Balloon Squadron AAF	Jan 1939		Jun 1944		4 Flights of 8 balloons. (52 balloons (12 Water-borne) in Aug 1940) Birkenhead.	
No. 920 Balloon Squadron AAF	Jan 1939		Dec 1943		4 Flights of 8 balloons (A & B Flights later 12 balloons each, C & D retained 8 each) Derry	
No. 921 (West Lancashire) Balloon Squadron AAF	Jan 1939		20 Feb 1943		3 Flights of 8 balloons (48 balloons in Aug 1940) Liverpool / Fazakerley.	
No. 922 (West Lancashire) Balloon Squadron AAF	Jan 1939		Dec 1943		4 Flights of 8 balloons Warrington / Curerdley	
No. 923 (West Lancashire) Balloon Squadron AAF	Jan 1939		Jun 1944		4 Flights of 8 balloons Runcorn / Birkenhead Reformed for Anti-'Diver' duties	
No. 924 Balloon Squadron AAF	Jan 1939				4 Flights of 8 balloons (24 balloons in Aug 1940) Southampton / Eastleigh.	
No. 925 (East Lancashire) Balloon Squadron AAF	Jan 1939		Jun 1944		3 Flights of 8 balloons (40 balloons in Aug 1940) Manchester	
No. 926 (East Lancashire) Balloon Squadron AAF			Jun 1944		3 Flights of 8 balloons (40 balloons in Aug 1940) Bowlee / Manchester	
No. 927 (County of Gloucester) Balloon Squadron AAF	Jan 1939				3 Flights of 8 balloons (32 balloons in Aug 1940) Bristol.	
No. 928 Balloon Squadron AAF	Jan 1939				3 Flights of 8 balloons (10 Water-borne Aug 1940) Felixstowe / Harwich	
No. 929 Balloon Squadron AAF	Jan 1939				3 Flights of 8 balloons (7 Water-borne Aug 1940) South Queensferry	
No. 930 (Hampshire) Balloon Squadron AAF	Jan 1939		Dec 1943		3 Flights of 8 balloons (50 balloons (10 Water-borne ) in Aug 1940) Southampton.	
No. 931 (Hampshire) Balloon Squadron AAF	Jan 1939		Dec 1943		3 Flights of 8 balloons	
No. 932 (Hampshire) Balloon Squadron AAF	Jan 1939				4 Flights of 8 balloons (32 balloons in Aug 1940) Portsmouth	
No. 933 (Hampshire) Balloon Squadron AAF	Jan 1939				3 Flights of 8 balloons Portsmouth / Gosport	
No. 934 (County of Devon) Balloon Squadron AAF	Jan 1939				5 Flights of 8 balloons (24 balloons in Aug 1940) Plymouth.	
No. 935 (County of Glamorgan) Balloon Squadron AAF	Jan 1939				2 Flights of 8 balloons (24 balloons in Aug 1940) Plymouth/Filton.	
No. 936 (County of Northumberland) Balloon Squadron AAF	20 Feb 1939		4 Jun 1943		4 Flights of 8 balloons (4 Water-borne Aug 1940) Newcastle upon Tyne Amalgamated with No 937 on 4 Jun 1943	
No. 937 (County of Northumberland) Balloon Squadron AAF	20 Feb 1939		4 Jun 1943		4 Flights of 8 balloons (40 balloons (3 Water-borne) in Aug 1940) Newcastle upon Tyne Amalgamated with No 936 on 4 Jun 1943	
No. 936/937 Balloon Squadron AAF	4 Jun 1943		1 Dec 1944			
No. 938 (County of Northumberland) Balloon Squadron AAF	20 Feb 1939		1 Dec 1944		3 Flights of 8 balloons (48 balloons in Aug 1940) Stockton on Tees / Billingham	
No. 939 (West Riding) Balloon Squadron AAF	Jan 1939				3 Flights of 8 balloons Sheffield	
No. 940 (West Riding) Balloon Squadron AAF			Jun 1944		Sheffield 3 Flights of 8 balloons	
No. 941 (West Riding) Balloon Squadron AAF	Jan 1939				3 Flights of 8 balloons (40 balloons in Aug 1940) Sheffield / Sunderland (May 1943) Amalgamated with 939 due to lack of volunteers	
No. 942 (East Riding) Balloon Squadron AAF	25 Jan 1939		1 Jan 1942		3 Flights of 8 balloons 42 balloons (24 Water-borne) in Aug 1940 RAF Sutton on Hull Amalgamated with 943 - 1 Jan 1942	
No. 943 (East Riding) Balloon Squadron AAF	25 Jan 1939		1 Jan 1942		3 Flights of 8 balloons (32 balloons in Aug 1940) RAF Sutton on Hull Amalgamated with 942 - 1 Jan 1942	
No. 942/943 (East Riding) Balloon Squadron AAF	1 Jan 1942		31 Aug 1944		Anti-'Diver- duties from 31 Jul 1944	
No. 944 (East Riding) Balloon Squadron AAF	25 Jan 1939		26 Apr 1942		3 Flights of 8 balloons RAF Sutton on Hull	
No. 945 (City of Glasgow) Balloon Squadron AAF	Jan 1939		Jun 1944		4 Flights of 8 balloons (40 balloons in Aug 1940) Glasgow Reformed in 22 Balloon Centre for Anti-'Diver' duties	
No. 946 (City of Glasgow) Balloon Squadron AAF	Jan 1939		Jun 1944		4 Flights of 8 balloons (48 balloons in Aug 1940) Renfrew	
No. 947 (City of Glasgow) Balloon Squadron AAF	Jan 1939		Jun 1944		3 Flights of 8 balloons (32 balloons in Aug 1940) Glasgow	
No. 947 (City of Glasgow) Balloon Squadron AAF	Jun 1944				Reformed in 22 Balloon Centre for Anti-'Diver' duties	
No. 948 Balloon Squadron RAF	Oct 1939		Dec 1944		24 balloons in Aug 1940 Rosyth	
No. 949 Balloon Squadron RAF	Oct 1939		Jun 1944		32 balloons in Aug 1940 Crewe Reformed in 23 Balloon Centre for Anti-'Diver' duties	
No. 950 Balloon Squadron RAF					Lyness, Orkney – Feb 1940, Kirkwall, Orkney - 1944 32 balloons in Aug 1940	
No. 951 Balloon Squadron RAF			Dec 1943		40 balloons in Aug 1940 Bristol until 19 Jun 1944 (Norwich) and then Anti-'Diver' duties	
No. 952 Balloon Squadron RAF	Nov 1939				Sheerness 40 balloons (32 Water-borne) in Aug 1940	
No. 953 Balloon Squadron RAF					Cardiff 1943/44 39 balloons (7 Water-borne) in Aug 1940 1943/44 -, Anti-'Diver' duties from Jun 1944	
No. 954 Balloon Squadron RAF					Cobham	
No. 955 Balloon Squadron RAF	1943		1944		Weston-super-Mare	
No. 956 Balloon Squadron RAF					24 balloons in Aug 1940	
No. 957 Balloon Squadron RAF	Jul 1940 –				Yeovil 24 balloons in Aug 1940	
No. 958 Balloon Squadron RAF	Jul 1940 -				Swansea 25 balloons (3 Water-borne) in Aug 1940 Reformed in 23 Balloon Centre for Anti-'Diver' duties	
No. 959 Balloon Squadron RAF	27 Aug 1940				RAF Feb 1940 - Lyness, Orkney to Dec 1943, Canterbury 1944 on 24 balloons (16 Water-borne) in Aug 1940	
No. 961 Balloon Squadron RAF	Jul 1940 –				Dover 8 Water-borne balloons (Aug 1940)	
No. 962 Balloon Squadron RAF	Sep 1940		Dec 1943		Milford Haven 24 balloons (9 Water-borne) in Aug 1940	
No. 963 Balloon Squadron RAF					Accrington - pre Dec 1943	
No. 964 Balloon Squadron RAF	Aug 1940 -				Torpoint, Plymouth 1944 on, 24 balloons (6 Water-borne) in Aug 1940	
No. 965 Balloon Squadron RAF	Jul 1940 -				Port Talbot 16 balloons in Aug 1940 Reformed in 23 Balloon Centre for Anti-'Diver' duties	
No. 966 Balloon Squadron RAF	Sep 1940 -				Newport, Monmouthshire, moved to RAF Seal south of London from Jun 1944, 40 balloons in Aug 1940, Reformed in 23 Balloon Centre for Anti-'Diver' duties	
No. 967 Balloon Squadron RAF			Dec 1943		Ardrossan 48 balloons in Aug 1940	
No. 968 Balloon Squadron RAF	Dec 1943				Belfast 16 balloons (8 Water-borne) in Aug 1940	
No. 969 Balloon Squadron RAF	Jul 1940				Barry pre Dec 1943, Great Yarmouth from Jun 1944 16 balloons in Aug 1940 Reformed in 23 Balloon Centre for Anti-'Diver' duties	
No. 970 Balloon Squadron RAF					Barrow-in-Furness - pre Dec 1943	
No. 971 Balloon Squadron RAF	1944				AHQ Eastern Mediterranean	
No. 972 Balloon Squadron RAF					Egypt	
No. 973 Balloon Squadron RAF	1944				AHQ Eastern Mediterranean	
No. 974 Balloon Squadron RAF					Egypt 2nd Tactical Air Force (2 TAF)	
No. 975 Balloon Squadron RAF	1944				No. 242 Group RAF	
No. 976 Balloon Squadron RAF					1944 2 TAF	
No. 977 Balloon Squadron RAF					1944 Mediterranean Coastal Air Forces	
No. 978 Balloon Squadron RAF	1941		1944		3 TAF	
No. 979 Balloon Squadron RAF					1944 3 TAF	
No. 980 Balloon Squadron RAF			6 Jun 1945		2 TAF (1944 on), 980 Sqn defended Abadan from 1942 and Khosrowabad before being moved via Jordan to the Suez Canal and then Italy	
No. 981 Balloon Squadron RAF	1941-				Mediterranean Coastal Air Forces Reformed in UK for Anti-'Diver' duties - 1944	
No. 982 Balloon Squadron RAF					1944 Mediterranean Coastal Air Forces	
No. 983 Balloon Squadron RAF					1944 Mediterranean Coastal Air Forces	
No. 984 Balloon Squadron RAF					1944 No. 222 Group RAF	
No. 985 Balloon Squadron RAF					1944 No. 242 Group RAF	
No. 986 Balloon Squadron RAF					1944 Malta	
No. 987 Balloon Squadron RAF	1 Sep 1943-				No. 224 Group RAF (1944 on)	
No. 988 Balloon Squadron RAF						
No. 989 Balloon Squadron RAF						
No. 990 Balloon Squadron RAF					1944 No. 222 Group AAF	
No. 991 Balloon Squadron RAF					2 TAF	
No. 992 (Mobile) Balloon Squadron RAF					Dec 1943 - No 30 (Balloon Barrage) Group RAF, Great Yarmouth, Jun 1944 to 85 Group, for the defence of ports.	
No. 993 (Mobile) Balloon Squadron RAF					Dec 1943 No 30 (Balloon Barrage) Group RAF, Chelmsford	
No. 994 (Mobile) Balloon Squadron RAF					Dec 1943 No 30 (Balloon Barrage) Group RAF, CanterburyJun 1944 to 85 Group,	
No. 995 (Mobile) Balloon Squadron RAF					Dec 1943 No 30 (Balloon Barrage) Group RAF, Titchfield	
No. 996 Balloon Squadron RAF					No. 85 Group RAF Mobile Unit for the defence of ports	
No. 997 Balloon Squadron RAF					Weymouth (1944) Mobile Unit for the defence of ports	
No. 998 Balloon Squadron RAF					Brighton (1944) Mobile Unit for the defence of ports	
No. 999 Balloon Squadron RAF					Paignton (1944) Mobile Unit for the defence of ports	

== Bases ==
Base	Formed	Formed At	Disbanded	Disbanded At	Notes
No. 1 Balloon Base					
No. 2 Balloon Base					
No. 3 Balloon Base					
No. 4 Balloon Base					
No. 5 Balloon Base					
No. 6 Balloon Base					
No. 7 Balloon Base					
No. 8 Balloon Base					
No. 9 Balloon Base					
No. 11 Balloon Base					
No. 12 Balloon Base					
No. 13 Balloon Base					
No. 14 Balloon Base					
No. 15 Balloon Base					
No. 16 Balloon Base					
No. 17 Balloon Base					
No. 18 Balloon Base					
No. 20 Balloon Base					
No. 21 Balloon Base					
No. 22 Balloon Base					
No. 23 Balloon Base					
No. 24 Balloon Base					
No. 25 Balloon Base					

== Detachments ==
Detachment	Formed	Formed At	Disbanded	Disbanded At	Notes
No. 1 Port/Beach Balloon Detachment					
No. 2 Port/Beach Balloon Detachment					
No. 3 Beach Balloon Detachment/Party					
No. 4 Beach Balloon Detachment/Party					
No. 5 Beach Balloon Detachment					
No. 6 Beach Balloon Detachment					
No. 7 (Middle East) Balloon Detachment					
'A' Beach Balloon Detachment/Party					
'B' Beach Balloon Detachment					
'C' Beach Balloon Detachment					
'D' Beach Balloon Detachment					
'E' Beach Balloon Detachment					
'F' Beach Balloon Detachment					
'K' Port Balloon Detachment					
'L' Port Balloon Detachment					

== Flights ==
Flight	Formed	Formed At	Disbanded	Disbanded At	Notes
No. 50 'B' Balloon Flight					
No. 51 'B' Balloon Flight					
No. 52 'B' Balloon Flight					
No. 53 'B' Balloon Flight					
No. 54 'B' Balloon Flight					
No. 55 'B' Balloon Flight					
No. 56 'B' Balloon Flight					
No. 57 'B' Balloon Flight					
No. 101 'P' Balloon Flight					
No. 102 'P' Balloon Flight					
No. 103 'P' Balloon Flight					
No. 104 'P' Balloon Flight					
No. 105 'P' Balloon Flight					
No. 106 'P' Balloon Flight					
No. 107 'P' Balloon Flight					
No. 108 'P' Balloon Flight					
No. 109 'P' Balloon Flight					
No. 110 'P' Balloon Flight					
No. 111 'P' Balloon Flight					
No. 112 'P' Balloon Flight					
No. 113 'P' Balloon Flight					
No. 114 'P' Balloon Flight					
No. 115 'P' Balloon Flight					
No. 116 'P' Balloon Flight					
No. 117 'P' Balloon Flight					
No. 118 'P' Balloon Flight					
No. 119 'P' Balloon Flight					
No. 120 'P' Balloon Flight					

== Units ==
Unit	Formed	Formed At	Disbanded	Disbanded At	Notes
Balloon Development Unit					
No. 1 Balloon Repair Unit					
No. 2 Balloon Repair Unit					
No. 1 Balloon & Tentage Repair Unit					
The Balloon Training Unit					
No. 1 Balloon Training Unit					
No. 2 Balloon Training Unit					
The Balloon Unit					
'A' Balloon Unit					
'B' Balloon Unit					
'C' Balloon Unit					
'D' Balloon Unit					
'E' Balloon Unit					
'A' ("K") Balloon Unit					
'B' ("K") Balloon Unit					
'C' ("K") Balloon Unit					
'D' ("K") Balloon Unit					
'E' ("K") Balloon Unit					
'F' ("K") Balloon Unit					
'G' ("K") Balloon Unit					
'K' ("K") Balloon Unit					
'L' ("K") Balloon Unit					
No. 1 'M' Balloon Unit					
No. 50 'B' Balloon Unit					
No. 51 'B' Balloon Unit					
No. 52 'B' Balloon Unit					
No. 53 'B' Balloon Unit					
No. 54 'B' Balloon Unit					
No. 55 'B' Balloon Unit					
No. 56 'B' Balloon Unit					

== Other units ==
Unit	Formed	Formed At	Disbanded	Disbanded At	Notes
RAF Balloon Centre					
Balloon Command					
Balloon Development Establishment					
Balloon Development Section					
Balloon Experimental & Training Depot					
No. 1 Balloon School of Instruction					
No. 2 Balloon School of Instruction					
Balloon Operations Squadron					
Balloon and Oxygen Centre					
Balloon Parachute Training Section					
No. 1 Balloon Repair Depot					
'X' Balloon Repair Section					
Balloon Repair Shop/Section					
Balloon Stores Depot					
Balloon Testing & Kite Balloon Experimental Station					
Balloon Training Centre					
Balloon Training Depot					
No. 1 Balloon Training Depot					
No. 2 Balloon Training Depot					
School of Balloon Training					
No. 1 Balloon Training School					
No. 2 Balloon Training School					
No. 1 Balloon Training Wing					
No. 2 Balloon Training Wing					
Balloon Wing					
1st Balloon Wing					
2nd Balloon Wing					
3rd Balloon Wing					
4th Balloon Wing					
5th Balloon Wing					
6th Balloon Wing					
7th Balloon Wing					
8th Balloon Wing					
9th Balloon Wing					
