= Listed buildings in Holmpton =

Holmpton is a civil parish in the county of the East Riding of Yorkshire, England. It contains six listed buildings that are recorded in the National Heritage List for England. All the listed buildings are designated at Grade II, the lowest of the three grades, which is applied to "buildings of national importance and special interest". The parish contains the village of Holmpton and the surrounding countryside, and the listed buildings consist of farmhouses, a farm building, a house and a church.

== Buildings ==
Name and location	Photograph	Date	Notes
Manor Farm House; 53.68808°N 0.06931°E		Early 18th century	The farmhouse is in rendered brick with stone dressings, quoins, and a hipped pantile roof. There are two storeys and an L-shaped plan, with a front range of three bays and four bays on the right return. On the front is a projecting porch with quoins and a pantile roof. The second bay on the return projects slightly and contains a doorway with a fanlight and a pediment. The windows on the front are sashes, and on the return they are casements.
Stable and dovecote northeast of Elmtree Farm Cottage; 53.68832°N 0.06680°E	—	Mid to late 18th century	The stable is in brick, with a floor band, stepped eaves, a pantile roof with tumbled-in brickwork on the raised gables, and square finials. There are two storeys, a rectangular plan and one bay. On the ground floor is a pair of stable doors with a central brick pier, and on the upper floor is a doorway with a segmental arch. On the ridge is a square wooden dovecote, with dove holes and a hipped roof.
Elmtree Farm Cottage; 53.68802°N 0.06671°E	—	Late 18th to early 19th century	The farmhouse is in red brick, with stepped eaves, and a pantile roof with tumbled-in brickwork on the raised gables. There are two storeys and attics, and three bays. In the centre is an open timber porch, and a doorway in an architrave with a fanlight. The windows are sashes in architraves under stucco flat arches incised in imitation of rubbed brick.
Rysome Garth; 53.67700°N 0.05906°E	—	Late 18th to early 19th century	The farmhouse is in red brick, and has a pantile roof with stone coping gables and shaped kneelers. There are two storeys and attics, a double depth plan, and three-bay twin-gabled fronts. In the centre of the south front is a doorway with a fanlight and a flat stucco arch, it is flanked by tripartite sash windows, and above it is a recessed circular panel. Most of the windows are sashes, some are in architraves, there are some casement windows, and all the windows have stucco flat arches.
Springfield House; 53.69239°N 0.07343°E	—	Early 19th century	The front of the house is faced in chequered red and blue brick, the sides and rear are in cobble with some brick, with brick quoins, stepped eaves, and a hipped pantile roof. There are two storeys and three bays. The central doorway has a four-pane fanlight, and a channelled stucco cambered arch. Most of the windows are sashes under similar arches, and there is a casement window and a horizontally sliding sash, both under segmental arches.
St Nicholas' Church; 53.68872°N 0.06911°E		1874	The church was rebuilt encasing parts of an earlier church. It is built in cobbles encased in yellow brick, with dressings in red brick and stone, and a Welsh slate roof. The church consists of a nave, a chancel with a north vestry, and a west tower. The tower has four stages, and contains a west door with a chamfered pointed arch and a hood mould, above which are lancet windows, some blind, lancet bell openings, a west clock face, and a coped embattled parapet with corner pinnacles. The windows on the body of the church are also lancets.
