= List of shipwrecks in January 1831 =

The list of shipwrecks in January 1831 includes ships sunk, foundered, grounded, or otherwise lost during January 1831.

== 3 January ==
List of shipwrecks: 3 January 1831
Ship	State	Description
Balclutha	United Kingdom	The ship was driven ashore and wrecked at Terranova, Sicily.

== 5 January ==
List of shipwrecks: 5 January 1831
Ship	State	Description
Frances	United Kingdom	The ship was wrecked at Barbuda. She was on a voyage from Liverpool, Lancashire, to New Orleans, Louisiana, United States.

== 6 January ==
List of shipwrecks: 6 January 1831
Ship	State	Description
Mary	United Kingdom	The ship foundered in the Irish Sea off Abergele, Caernarfonshire, with the loss of seven of her crew. She was on a voyage from Newport, Monmouthshire, to Liverpool, Lancashire.

== 8 January ==
List of shipwrecks: 8 January 1831
Ship	State	Description
Mercury	United Kingdom	The ship ran aground in Gourock Bay and was wrecked.

== 9 January ==
List of shipwrecks: 9 January 1831
Ship	State	Description
Elizabeth & Harriet	United Kingdom	The ship was driven ashore and wrecked at Gibraltar. She was on a voyage from Zante, Greece, to London
Nostra Señora de Montserrat	Spain	The ship was driven ashore at Málaga.

== 10 January ==
List of shipwrecks: 10 January 1831
Ship	State	Description
Margaretta	Bremen	The ship was wrecked on the north coast of Harbour Island, Bahamas. Her crew were rescued. She was on a voyage from Bremen to Havana, Cuba.
Virginie	France	The ship sprang a leak and foundered in the English Channel off Jersey, Channel Islands. All on board were rescued. She was on a voyage from Granville, Manche to Jersey.

== 11 January ==
List of shipwrecks: 11 January 1831
Ship	State	Description
Betsey	United Kingdom	The ship was driven ashore and severely damaged at Loch Indaal.
Mary Ann	United Kingdom	The ship sank at Dumfries.
Vulcan	United Kingdom	The ship ran aground on the Haisborough Sands, in the North Sea off the coast of Norfolk. She was consequently beached at Great Yarmouth, Norfolk.

== 12 January ==
List of shipwrecks: 12 January 1831
Ship	State	Description
Duke of Wellington	United Kingdom	The ship sank at Jersey, Channel Islands.

== 14 January ==
List of shipwrecks: 14 January 1831
Ship	State	Description
Anna Elizabeth	Sweden	The ship ran aground on the Cross Sand, in the North Sea off Lowestoft, Suffolk, United Kingdom, and was abandoned by her crew. She was on a voyage from Gothenburg to London, United Kingdom.

== 16 January ==
List of shipwrecks: 16 January 1831
Ship	State	Description
Helen	United Kingdom	The ship was wrecked on Ballyquinton Point, County Down. She was on a voyage from Liverpool, Lancashire, to Glasgow, Renfrewshire.

== 18 January ==
List of shipwrecks: 18 January 1831
Ship	State	Description
Lady Codrington	(United Kingdom of Great Britain and Ireland) Barbuda	The ship was wrecked at Barbuda.
Nova	Portugal	The ship was wrecked on Terceira, Azores. All on board were rescued. She was on a voyage from Pernambuco, Brazil, to Lisbon.

== 19 January ==
List of shipwrecks: 19 January 1831
Ship	State	Description
Malvina	United Kingdom	The ship was in collision with Isabella (United Kingdom) in the North Sea off Happisburgh, Norfolk, and was consequently beached there. Her crew were rescued by Isabella. Malvina was on a voyage from Newcastle upon Tyne, Northumberland, to London.

== 20 January ==
List of shipwrecks: 20 January 1831
Ship	State	Description
Lucretia	(Russian Empire) Grand Duchy of Finland	The ship was driven ashore and wrecked at Cádiz, Spain.

== 21 January ==
List of shipwrecks: 21 January 1831
Ship	State	Description
Jane	United Kingdom	The ship was wrecked at Balbriggan, County Dublin.

== 22 January ==
List of shipwrecks: 22 January 1831
Ship	State	Description
Mary	United Kingdom	The ship driven ashore and subsequently sank at Cley-next-the-Sea, Norfolk. Her crew were rescued. She was on a voyage from Sunderland, County Durham to London.
Port of Spain	United Kingdom	The ship was lost with all hands. She was on a voyage from the West Indies to Halifax, Nova Scotia, British North America.

== 24 January ==
List of shipwrecks: 24 January 1831
Ship	State	Description
Concordia	Sweden	The ship was wrecked on the Goodwin Sands, Kent, United Kingdom. Her thirteen crew were rescued by Deal boatmen. She was on a voyage from St. Ubes, Spain to Bergen, Norway.
Henry	United Kingdom	The brig was driven ashore at Winterton-on-Sea, Norfolk, with the loss of three of her seven crew. Survivors were rescued by the Winterton Lifeboat.

== 25 January ==
List of shipwrecks: 25 January 1831
Ship	State	Description
Abigail	United States	The sloop foundered at Leeds Point, New Jersey.
Merino	United Kingdom	The ship was wrecked near Hartlepool, County Durham. Her crew were rescued.

== 26 January ==
List of shipwrecks: 26 January 1831
Ship	State	Description
Bons Amis	France	The ship was wrecked off Marseille, Bouches-du-Rhône. Her crew were rescued.

== 27 January ==
List of shipwrecks: 27 January 1831
Ship	State	Description
Cumberland	United Kingdom	The ship was wrecked on the Barnard Sand, in the North Sea off Southwold, Suffolk. Her crew were rescued. She was on a voyage from Newcastle upon Tyne, Northumberland, to London.

== 28 January ==
List of shipwrecks: 28 January 1831
Ship	State	Description
Cumberland	United Kingdom	The brig struck the Barnard Sand and foundered in the North Sea 3 nautical miles (5.6 km) off Southwold, Suffolk. Her crew were rescued.

== 30 January ==
List of shipwrecks: 30 January 1831
Ship	State	Description
Minerva	United Kingdom	The ship was wrecked at Buenos Aires, Argentina.

== 31 January ==
List of shipwrecks: 31 January 1831
Ship	State	Description
Barbadoes Packet	United Kingdom	The ship was driven ashore at Chapel St. Leonards, Lincolnshire. Her crew were rescued. She was on a voyage from Cádiz, Spain to Hull, Yorkshire.
Friends	United Kingdom	The ship capsized at Newcastle upon Tyne, Northumberland.
Isabella	United Kingdom	The ship was driven ashore at Skegness, Lincolnshire. Her crew were rescued.
Jane	United Kingdom	The ship was driven ashore 3 nautical miles (5.6 km) east of Campbeltown, Argyllshire.
Jane and Ann	United Kingdom	The ship foundered in the North Sea off Holmpton, Yorkshire.
Jenny	United Kingdom	The ship was driven ashore and Damaged at Ingoldmells, Lincolnshire. Her crew were rescued. She was on a voyage from Messina, Sicily to Hull. Jenny was refloated in late February and taken in to Hull.
Mary	United Kingdom	The ship was driven ashore in the River Mersey. She was on a voyage from Maranhão, Brazil, to Liverpool, Lancashire.
Neptunus	Sweden	The ship struck a rock off Fleckeroë, Norway and foundered with the loss of all but three of her crew. She was on a voyage from St. Ubes. Spain to Gothenburg.
York	United Kingdom	The ship was driven ashore at Ingoldmells. She was on a voyage from London to York.

== Unknown date ==
List of shipwrecks: Unknown date 1831
Ship	State	Description
Andrew Forbes	United Kingdom	The ship was wrecked at Islandmagee, County Antrim. She was on a voyage from Ballyshannon, County Donegal, to Liverpool, Lancashire.
Ceres	United States	The ship was lost before 8 January with the loss of three of her crew. She was on a voyage from New York to Grenada.
Lively	United Kingdom	The ship was wrecked near Balbaggan, County Dublin, with the loss of all hands.
Opossum	(United Kingdom of Great Britain and Ireland) New South Wales	The schooner may have been wrecked on Bruny Island, Van Diemen's Land.
Peter & Jane	United Kingdom	The ship was driven ashore at Flamborough Head, Yorkshire, in late January.
St. Rosalie	United Kingdom	The ship was abandoned in the Mediterranean Sea. She was on a voyage from Genoa, Kingdom of Sardinia, to London.
