= RAF Patrington =

Former RAF station in the East Riding of Yorkshire, England

RAF Patrington
- Patrington Haven, East Yorkshire in England
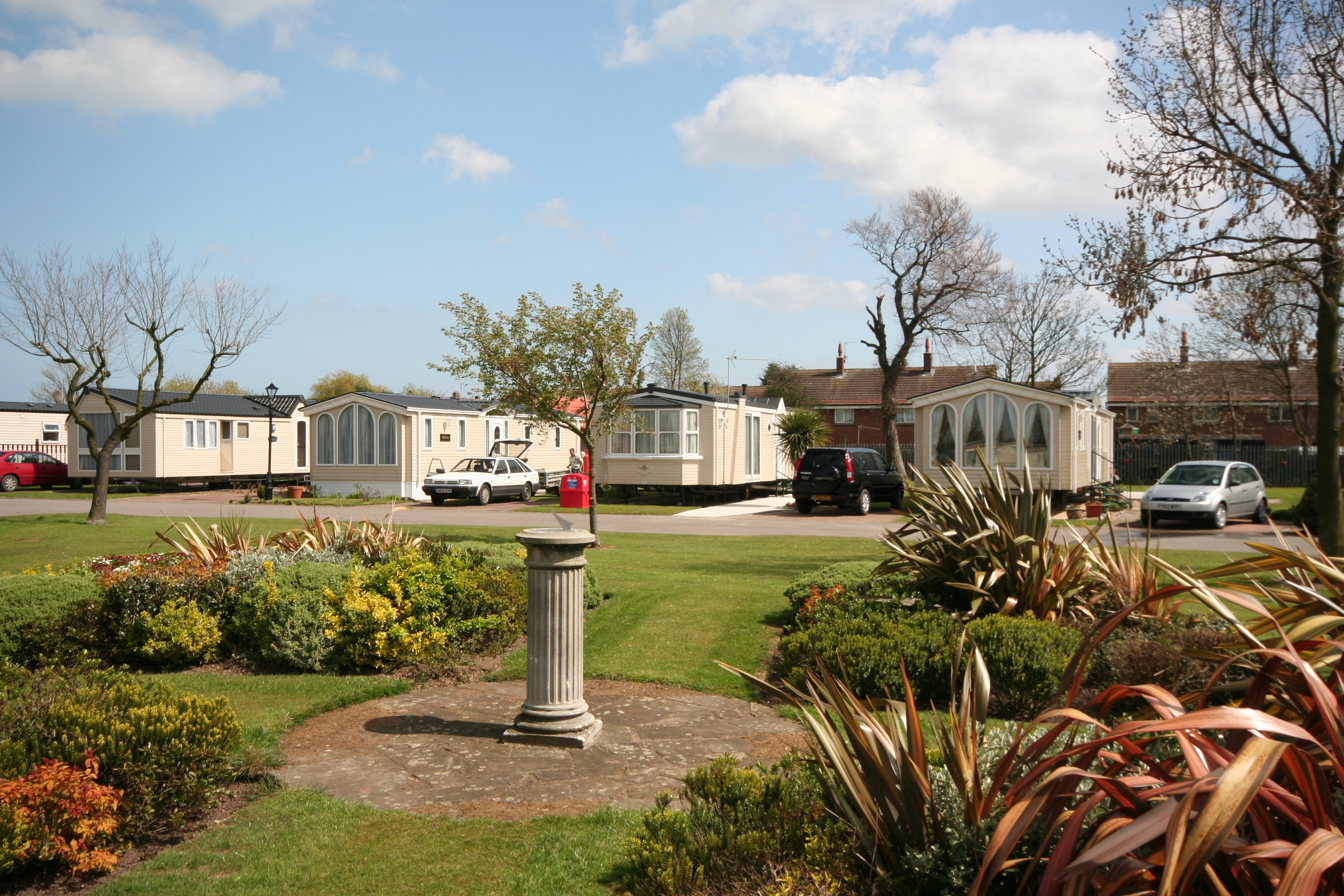
- Gardens at Patrington Haven Leisure Park; this was the domestic site

Site information
- Type: Radar site
- Code: 09G
- Owner: Air Ministry (1942–1964); Ministry of Defence (1964–1975)
- Operator: Royal Air Force
- Controlled by: RAF Fighter Command

Location
- Location within East Riding of Yorkshire
- Coordinates: 53.663°N 0.038°W
- Grid reference: TA297203
- Area: 39 acres (16 ha)

Site history
- In use: 1942–1955 (Radar site); 1951–1975 (domestic site)
- Fate: Partially demolished

RAF Patrington (or Royal Air Force Patrington), was a Ground-controlled interception (GCI) station of the Royal Air Force in the East Riding of Yorkshire, England. The base was operational during the Second World War, but was replaced by RAF Holmpton during the Cold War, although Patrington's domestic site remained open until the mid-1970s to house personnel for Holmpton. Some of the buildings of the old technical site survive abandoned near to Patrington Haven, but the domestic site has had a holiday park built upon it.

== History ==
The site was opened in January 1942 as Ground Controlled Interception (GCI) station number 09G, staffed by technicians from No. 73 Signals Wing, part of No. 60 Group RAF. The main building on the technical site was known as the Happidrome, which was used as the Northern Sector Operations Centre (SOC) between 1947 and 1953, until the SOC at RAF Shipton was opened. Domestic accommodation was opened at Patrington Haven in the early 1950s which remained until 1975 and the combined RAF Patrington locations covered an area of 39 acres (16 ha). The houses were later sold, but the barrack blocks were demolished and replaced with a holiday site.

In October 1952, during Exercise Ardent, 100 paratroopers were dropped in East Yorkshire to simulate an attack on a Sector Operations Centre (SOC), with Patrington being chosen as the target. At the same time, Patrington was being used as a reporting centre for a Search and Rescue helicopter (SAR) which was based out of RAF Linton-on-Ouse. It would continue to have a helicopter role when a Sycamore from No. 275 Sqn was outbased at Patrington during 1953 and 1954. During the early 1950s, controllers of the Bloodhound surface to air (SAM) missile programme were outbased at Patrington. During this time, the staff at weekends were drawn from the RAuxAF Fighter Control Units, No. 3609 (West Riding) Squadron being a large supplier of auxiliary workers at the site.

The original site at Patrington was due to be upgraded to have a new bunker under the ROTOR programme, but the geological conditions at the site were found to be unsuitable, as it was land reclaimed from the Humber Estuary. So the radar site at Easington on the East Riding coast was closed, and a new bunker was built at Holmpton some 6 miles (9.7 km) distant from Patrington technical site eastwards.

=== Chronology ===
- 1942 – sites opens as a GCI at TA297203
- 1951 – Domestic site opens at TA302212 (Note: Until the domestic site was opened, it appears staff were billeted where places could be found. In his letters to friends and relatives, Ted Hughes describes travelling to Patrington from RAF Sutton-on-Hull each time, leaving at 18:00, and returning "at 5 at night.." (05:00).)
- 1953–1954 – Underground bunker site opens at TA366288 as RAF Holmpton
- 1955 – Technical site at Patrington closes
- 1958 – The domestic site at Patrington, and the technical site at Holmpton become known as RAF Patrington
- 1975 – Domestic site at Patrington closes, the bunker site reverts to being called RAF Holmpton
- 1984 – The domestic site is auctioned off by the MoD

== Post closure ==
Since it was sold off in the 1980s, the domestic site now hosts a holiday park. In 2013, a memorial sculpture was unveiled on the holiday site. The original buildings at the Patrington Second World War site are still there, including the Happidrome.

== Notable personnel ==
- Geoffrey Cooper, former officer commanding in 1971
- Ted Hughes – Hughes served as a ground wireless mechanic at the site between 1949 and 1952.
- Alan Rawlinson, former officer commanding in 1958
