= RAF Sutton on Hull =

Royal Air Force base in Yorkshire, England

RAF Sutton on Hull
- RAF Bransholme
- Bransholme, Sutton-on-Hull; Near Hull in England
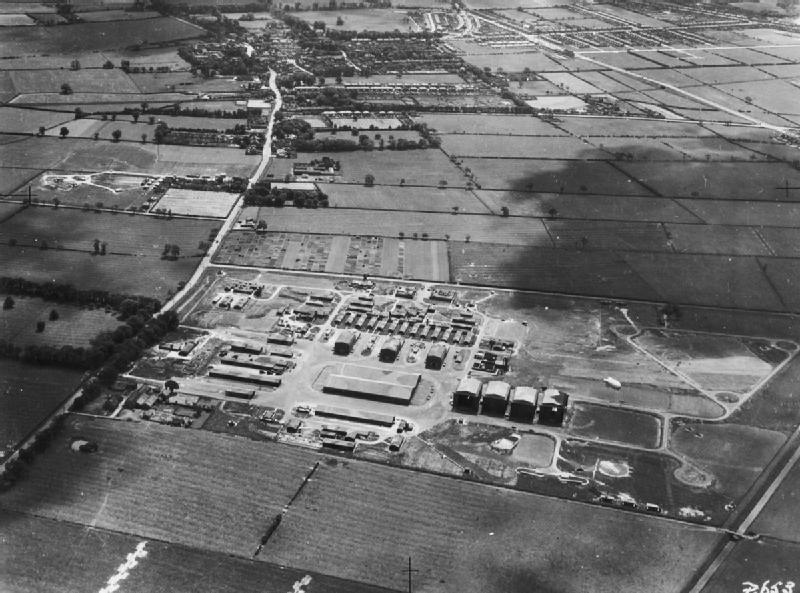
- Looking south eastwards over RAF Sutton on Hull towards the city of Kingston upon Hull (1941–1942)

Site information
- Type: Royal Air Force station 17 Balloon Centre; RAF School of Firefighting; No 3505 Fighter Control Unit
- Owner: Air Ministry
- Operator: Royal Air Force

Location
- Shown within East Riding of Yorkshire
- Coordinates: 53°47′22.3″N 0°19′21.2″W

Site history
- Built: 1938
- In use: 1939–1961

Royal Air Force Sutton on Hull or more simply RAF Sutton on Hull (Note: The name of the village is written Sutton-on-Hull. The Blue Plaque commemorating the station lists it as Sutton on Hull as does the one on the gates in East Park, Hull. In most references, the station is referred to without the hyphenation.) is a former Royal Air Force station situated in the suburb of Sutton-on-Hull (part of Kingston upon Hull) in the East Riding of Yorkshire that operated from 1938 to 1961. During the Second World War, its primary role was to operate as No. 17 Balloon Centre of 33 Group (under RAF Balloon Command) which was headquartered in Sheffield. The balloons deployed from here were used as part of the defensive tactics against Luftwaffe bombing raids on Hull, Hull Docks, Grimsby and the wider Humber area.

After the war, the base was home to the Royal Air Force Fire and Rescue School before it moved to Royal Air Force Catterick in 1959. The site of the station is now part of the Bransholme estate.

== History ==
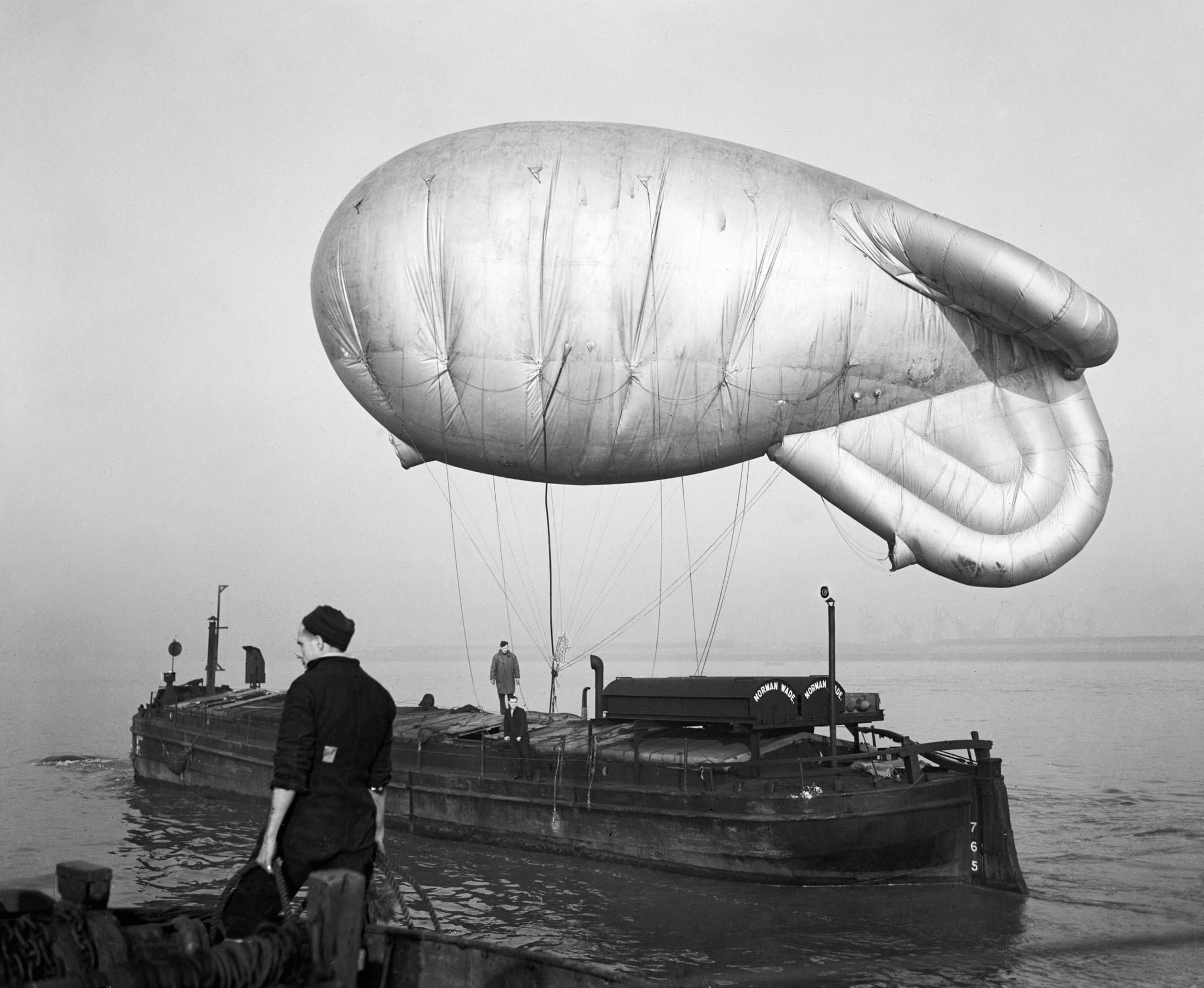
A kite balloon tethered to the balloon barge NORMAN WADE on the River Humber, at No. 17 Balloon Centre at Sutton-on-Hull in Yorkshire, January 1943.

Construction of the base started in late 1938 and by early 1939, it was ready to be occupied with official opening coming on 28 June 1939. The base was renamed RAF Sutton on Hull in October 1942 when No. 17 Balloon Centre was disbanded.

The operational aspect of the Balloon Centre consisted of three Royal Auxiliary Air Force (RAuxAF) Squadrons; No's 942, 943 & 944 (East Riding) Balloon Squadrons. Each Squadron consisted of five flights with nine balloons. Each balloon was crewed by a Corporal, ten Airmen of the RAuxAF and one regular Royal Air Force Balloon operator. The base was commanded by No. 33 Group (part of Balloon Command) which was headquartered in Sheffield. The three squadrons collectively were allotted 72 balloons between them.

During the war, some of the Squadrons became staffed by the Women's Auxiliary Air Force whilst in 1944, No's 942 and 943 Squadrons amalgamated into 942/3 Squadron. Later in the same year, No. 944 squadron was disbanded and No 942/3 squadron was moved south to London as part of the Anti-Diver Barrage against the V1 Flying Bombs.

All of Balloon Command became redundant towards the end of 1944 with the cessation of barrages and in February 1945, Balloon Command was officially disbanded.

In August 1943, the Royal Air Force School of Fire Fighting and Rescue inaugurated training at RAF Sutton on Hull. Training continued throughout the war and afterwards with the school being awarded its own badge in December 1953. In 1955, the trade came under the umbrella of the RAF Regiment (Trade Group 22) and as a result, four years later the school was moved to Royal Air Force Catterick where the RAF Regiment training and HQ were located.

RAF Sutton on Hull was also the location of No. 3505 Fighter Control Unit between 1947 and 1961. The FCU was awarded its own badge in 1951 which is the White Rose of York with four equal sparks of lightning emanating from behind the rose. The motto of the unit was Intercipere et delere which translates as [to] Intercept and Destroy. The FCU's were created to work with the RAuxAF Fighter Squadrons, but as these were disbanded in 1957, so too were the FCU's wound up.

== Lodger units ==
Besides the three main units operating from RAF Sutton on Hull, various lodger units were allocated there over the course of its operational history. These were;

- Radio and Wireless mechanics training.
- Starfish units – These units were employed to set fires and light up beacons in order to attract bombs away from real targets.
- RAF School of Aircraft Recognition – courses lasted 16 days and were available to all branches of the armed services and the US Army Air Force.
- No 21 Embarkation Unit – personnel from this unit oversaw shipping of military equipment into and out of the Humber Ports.
- RAF Safety Equipment Workers School
- No 62 RAF Reserve Centre – in operation only between March 1947 until May 1948.
- No 3 RAF Movements Unit – this unit dealt with RAF personnel arriving and departing through Hull Docks.
- No 152 (City of Hull) Air Training Corps Squadron – used RAF Sutton on Hull from 1946 until 1961. After 1961, they still used the Station Parade Square for drill whilst accommodated in the City of Hull. They returned in 1962 and operated out of the former guardroom until 1969. No 152 (City of Hull) Squadron is still in existence today.

== Post war ==
In 1947, one of the buildings on the camp was broken into and various items were discovered to be missing. Due to the harmful nature of the missing items (phosphorus grenades, tear gas generators and chloropicrin), the local police actually took to the streets with loudhailers warning of the inherent danger of the missing items and appealing for their return.

After the School of Fire Fighting was relocated, the site was finally closed and most of the estate was sold off to Hull Corporation in 1961, however, some of the housing was kept as military families quarters for those working at RAF Holmpton.

Only No 3505 FCU and the RAF School of Fire Fighting were issued with approved badges. RAF Sutton on Hull just displayed whichever command or group that it resided under at that time.

== Modern day ==
The site of the Balloon Centre is now part of the Bransholme estate. The Bransholme estate is believed to be the largest Council estate in Yorkshire. The main gates to the base were re-hung at Hull East Park and renovated in 1999 to commemorate the 60th anniversary of the site being opened.

== Notable personnel ==
- Basil Bunting, worked at RAF Sutton on Hull during 1940 as part of No. 942 Squadron Balloon Command.
- Ted Hughes – Hughes served as a ground wireless mechanic at RAF Patrington between 1949 and 1952, but was billeted at RAF Sutton on Hull.
