= Geoffrey Cooper (RAF officer) =

Former Royal Air Force Officer

- Born: Geoffrey Strickland Cooper; 25 October 1925; Essex, England
- Died: 14 December 2014 (aged 89)
- Military career
- Allegiance: United Kingdom
- Branch: Royal Air Force
- Unit: 208 Squadron

Geoffrey Strickland Cooper OBE (25 October 1925 – 13 December 2014) was a Royal Air Force officer of the post-Second World War era who as a fighter pilot saw action in the Middle East and Malaya.

In early 1948, Cooper was stationed at Ramat David in Palestine with 208 Squadron when his base came under attack from a Spitfire of the Egyptian Air Force, destroying two British Spitfires on the ground. Just hours later an Egyptian patrol of three more Spitfires attacked again. In the subsequent fight, Cooper shot down one Spitfire, damaged another which a colleague then shot down, and a third was destroyed from the ground.

In January 1949, while on patrol, Cooper was involved in a fight with Spitfires of the Israeli Air Force and forced to bail out inside Egyptian territory. He was found by Bedouin tribesmen and returned to his base.

In 1956, Cooper was involved in actions against communist insurgents in Malaya. In 1971, Cooper was in command at RAF Patrington, a radar site in the East Riding of Yorkshire.

Cooper retired from the RAF in 1978 as an Air Commodore. He then worked as the air correspondent of the Daily Telegraph.
