= Holmpton =

Village and civil parish in the East Riding of Yorkshire, England

Coordinates: 53°41′16″N 0°04′06″E

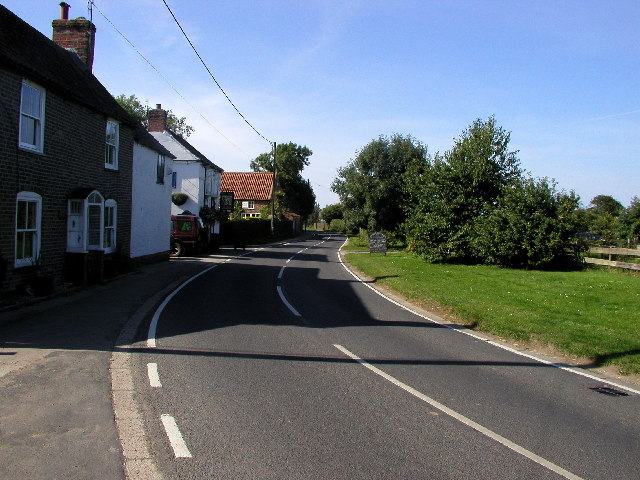
- Holmpton village

- Location within the East Riding of Yorkshire
- Population: 228 (2011 census)
- OS grid reference: TA366234
  - London: 150 mi (240 km) S
- Civil parish: Holmpton
- Unitary authority: East Riding of Yorkshire
- Ceremonial county: East Riding of Yorkshire
- Region: Yorkshire and the Humber
- Country: England
- Sovereign state: United Kingdom
- Post town: WITHERNSEA
- Postcode district: HU19
- Dialling code: 01964
- Police: Humberside
- Fire: Humberside
- Ambulance: Yorkshire
- UK Parliament: Beverley and Holderness

Holmpton is a village and civil parish in the East Riding of Yorkshire, England, in an area known as Holderness. It is situated approximately 3 miles (5 km) south of Withernsea town centre and 3 miles (5 km) east of the village of Patrington. It lies just inland from the North Sea coast.

According to the 2011 UK Census, the parish had a population of 228, an increase on the 2001 UK Census figure of 193.

St Nicholas' Church, Holmpton is a Grade II listed building.

The Greenwich Prime Zero meridian line passes through the parish.

In 1823, Holmpton was a parish in the Wapentake of Holderness. The patronage of the parish church was under the King. Population at the time was 256. Occupations included eight farmers, two wheelwrights, a blacksmith, two tailors, a milliner, a shoemaker, a shopkeeper, and the landlord of The Board public house. There was also a schoolmaster, a curate, and a gentleman. A carrier operated between the village and Hull twice weekly.

== History ==
Holmpton is mentioned in the Domesday Book as Homletone, which is a mixture of Old Norse and Old English, holmr-tūn (island farmstead or village). Like many other locations on the Holderness Coast, the village is subject to coastal erosion. A measurement in the 19th century determined that the church was only 1,130 yards (1,030 m) from the sea; it was 1,200 yards (1,100 m) away in 1786; a loss of 70 yards (64 m) in less than 50 years. The road to the north connecting Holmpton to Withernsea, is also under threat of coastal erosion, with the belief that the road could disappear during a hard winter.

The pub in the village, The George and Dragon, closed down in 2017. It was previously the subject of a closure application in 1926 for religious reasons, but it was kept open as a place to look after the survivors of shipwrecks on that part of the coast.

== RAF Holmpton ==
The village is home to RAF Holmpton, built originally as an early warning radar station, and now refurbished to act as museum and archive.

Royal Air Force Holmpton is still a part of the RAF and the Defence Estate (2009). It currently hosts a Public Exhibition and is also home to the Defence Archives Unit. RAF Holmpton is managed by HIPPO, an Independent Finance Initiative. The site runs to about 36 acres (15 ha) and consists of a number of surface structures along with a secure 35,000 square feet (0.33 ha) command bunker which is about 100 feet (30 m) below ground.

The bunker was first built in 1951–3 and started life as an early Warning Station (part of the ROTOR programme). In the late 1960s it became a Master Comprehensive Radar Station which eventually closed in 1974. The part of the site used for training was converted in the 1980s to form the new War HQ for RAF Support Command. With the ending of the Cold War this function ceased in 1991 and the site returned to training until the late 1990s when it was rebuilt to become the 1st experimental HQ of the new CCIS Electronic Warfare System. This function left the site in 2000–01. In 2003 Defence Archives moved to the site and in 2004 the first public exhibition opened. The exhibition opens throughout the year to visitors and 75% of the bunker is included in the visit, apart from AREA 7 which remains classified.

== Second World War ==
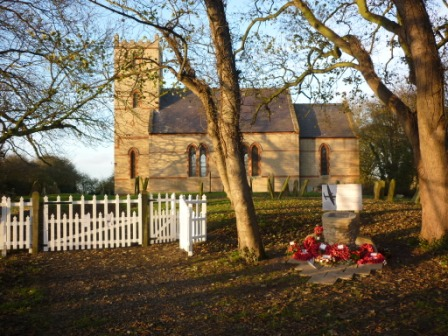
Holmpton Memorial, 7 November 2009

On 14 January 1942 at 20.44, a Royal Air Force Avro Manchester bomber crashed on Mill Hill south of the village of Holmpton. The plane was seen with the port engine on fire with flames extending back past the tail. It struck the hill and exploded on impact killing all seven crew members on board.

The plane was Avro Manchester L7523 EM:M of No. 207 Squadron RAF stationed at RAF Bottesford in Leicestershire. It had been charged with attacking the Blohm and Voss shipyards in Hamburg. The plane was delayed on take-off due to an unknown technical issue and eventually headed for the North Sea some time behind the rest of the squadron. The time of flight, and speed of the Manchester, doesn't allow the aircraft to have reached Hamburg and it is most likely to have reached the Dutch Frisian Islands before returning home, either hit by the enemy or very likely a mechanical failure which was common with the Avro Manchester.

A memorial to the crew of the aircraft was dedicated in November 2009 in the grounds of St Nicholas church in Holmpton.

== See also ==
- Listed buildings in Holmpton
