= St Nicholas' Church, Holmpton =

Church in Holmpton, East Riding of Yorkshire, England

Coordinates: 53°41′19″N 0°04′09″E

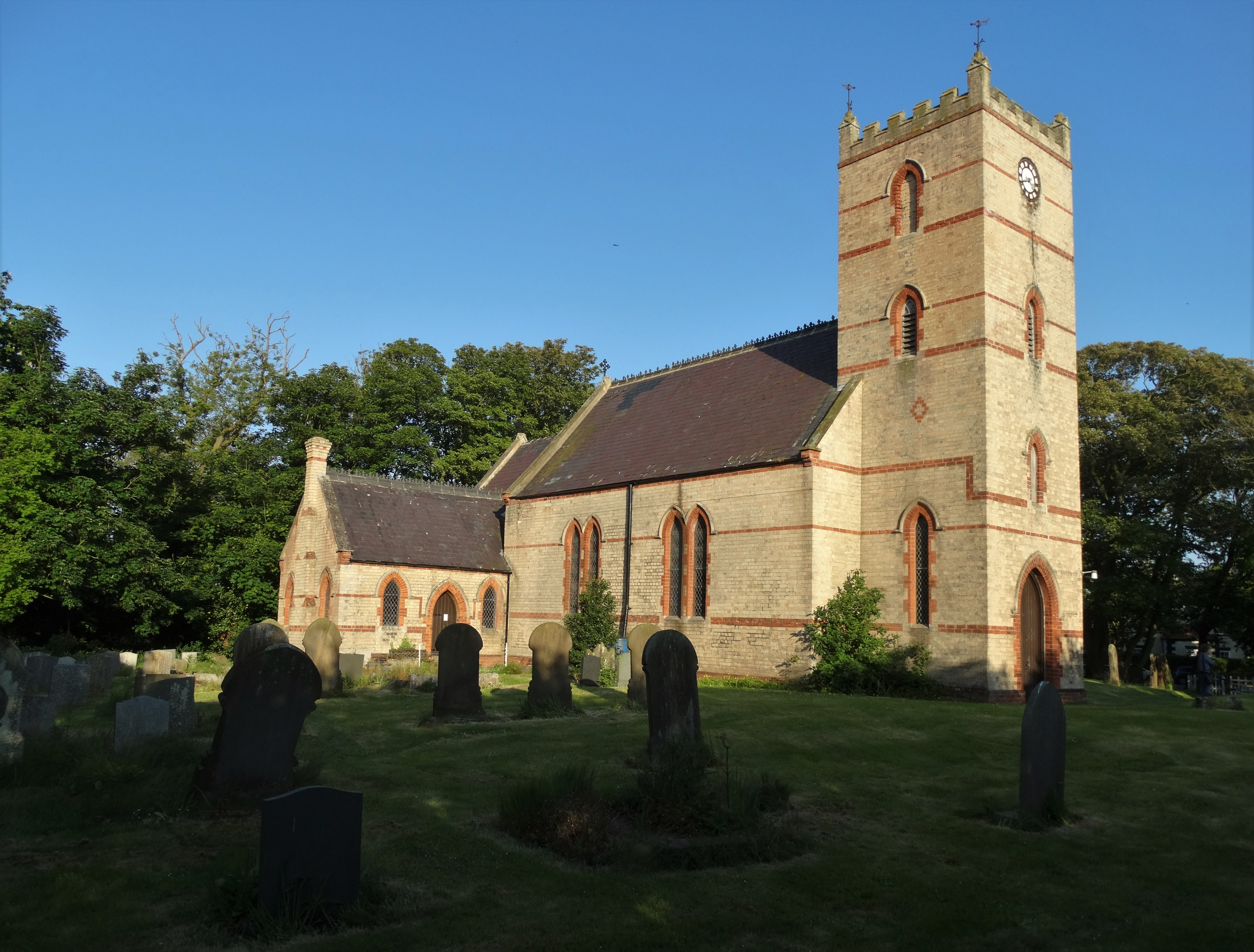
The church, in 2016

St Nicholas' Church is the parish church of Holmpton, a village in the East Riding of Yorkshire, in England.

There was a church in Holmpton in the mediaeval period. It had a nave with north aisle and chancel, cobble walls and a pantile roof. The north aisle was demolished at some time, then in 1832 a brick tower was constructed. The church was heavily altered between 1874 and 1875, to a design by R. Beevers. He rebuilt the tower, encased the nave and chancel in brick, replaced the windows, and added a vestry. The building was grade II listed in 1987.

The church is built of cobbles encased in yellow brick, with dressings in red brick and stone, and a Welsh slate roof. It consists of a nave, a chancel with a north vestry, and a west tower. The tower has four stages, and contains a west door with a chamfered pointed arch and a hood mould, above which are lancet windows, some blind, lancet bell openings, a west clock face, and a coped embattled parapet with corner pinnacles. The windows on the body of the church are also lancets. Inside, there is a reredos in the Gothick style, dating from 1895; stained glass by William Wailes; and monuments dating from 1767 and 1820.

== See also ==
- Listed buildings in Hollym, East Riding of Yorkshire
