= RAF Holmpton =

Royal Air Force base in Yorkshire, England

RAF Holmpton
- Near Holmpton, East Riding of Yorkshire. in England
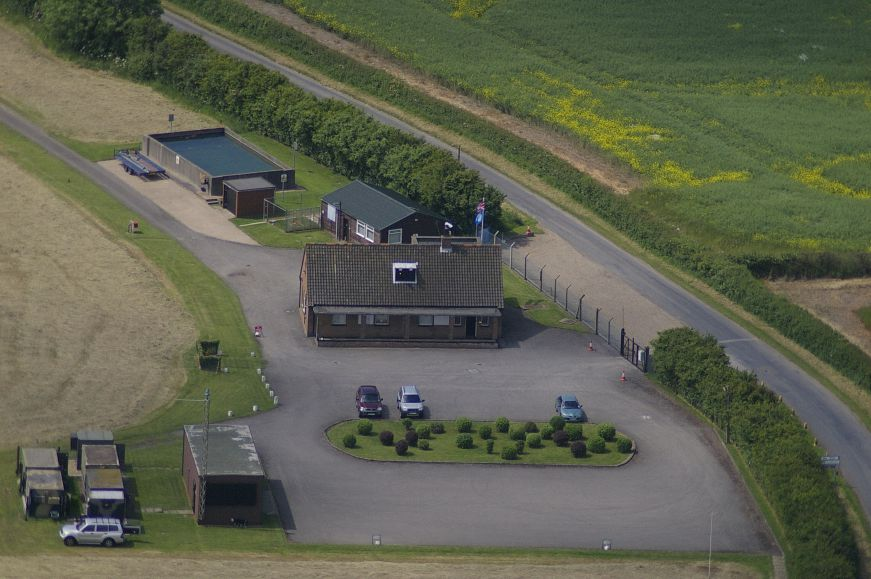
- Aerial View of RAF Holmpton 2013

Site information
- Type: RAF Command Bunker
- Owner: RL(FRAFS)BLC Limited
- Controlled by: Not for Profit
- Open to the public: 2016 – 23 March to 29 August
- Condition: Fully maintained

Location
- RAF Holmpton within the East Riding of Yorkshire
- Coordinates: 53.6839°N 0.0673°E
- Height: 100 feet (30 m) deep excavation

Site history
- Built: 1951
- In use: 1953–2014
- Materials: Concrete/steel/tungsten

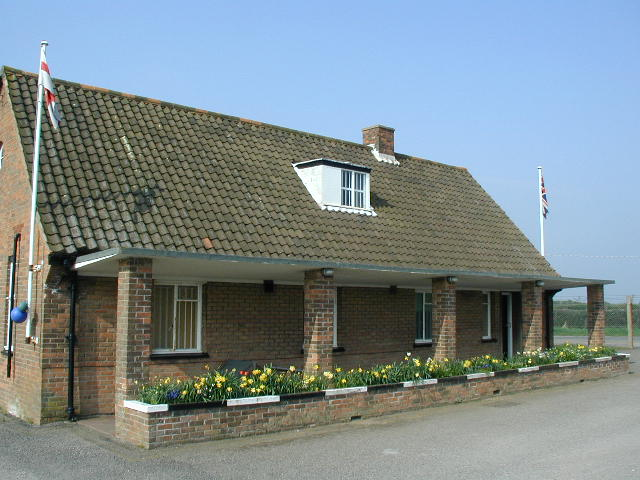
The Guardroom typical of an east coast ROTOR bunker

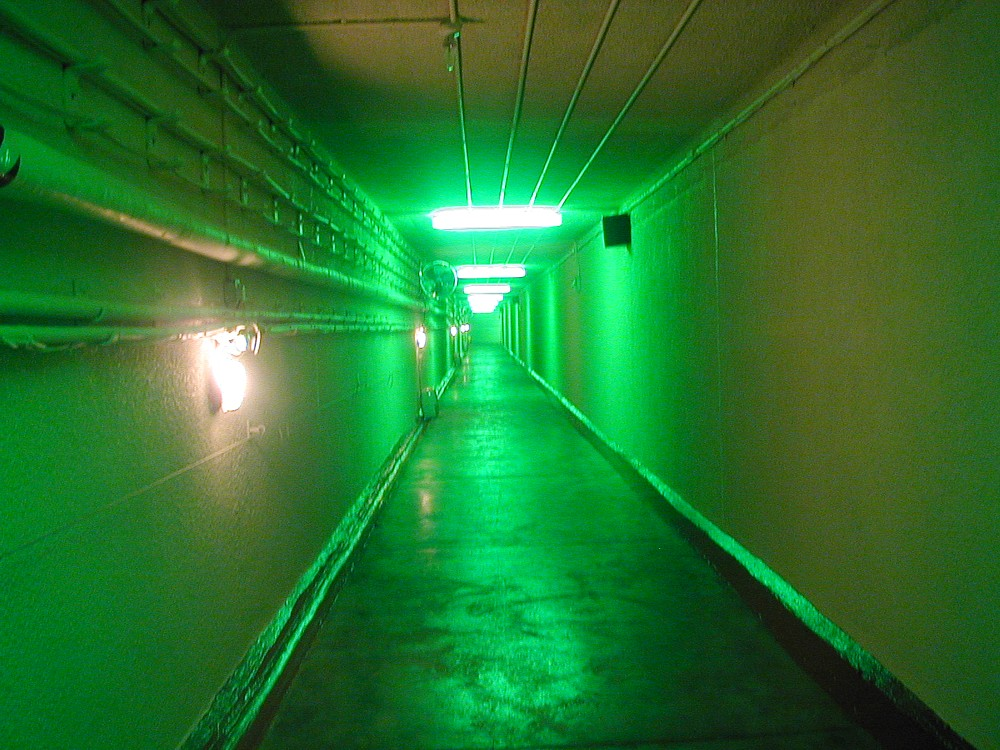
The Access Tunnel to the Bunker, although the lights are now standard white

Royal Air Force Holmpton or more simply RAF Holmpton is a former Royal Air Force Cold War era nuclear bunker that was built in the 1950s as an early warning radar station as part of the ROTOR Radar Defence Programme. Located just south of the village of Holmpton, in the East Riding of Yorkshire, England, RAF Holmpton remained a part of the Defence Estate until it was sold into private ownership on 8 December 2014, after 62 years of military service.

The site runs to about 36 acres (150,000 m^{2}) and comprises a number of surface structures along with a secure 35,000 square feet (3,300 m^{2}) command bunker which is about 100 feet (30 m) below ground.

== Rotor ==
The Bunker Design type R3-M2 (R3=Rotor Bunker Design M2=Including 2 additional mezzanine floors) was first built from 1951–3 and started life as an early warning radar station, part of the ROTOR programme. The bunker was originally intended to be built at nearby RAF Patrington, but the ground conditions at Patrington prevented this. An R3-M2 is a larger version of the standard UK R3 Bunker and RAF Holmpton was the only example of this type of structure in the UK as it combined several radar functions in the one building, and was a prototype for three similar bunkers built in Europe during the Cold War. The base covered 36 acres (15 ha), and the bunker is set in an excavation of about 100-foot (30 m). It is encased in 10-foot (3 m) of solid concrete all round, with tungsten rods providing additional stability to the outer shell. The shell is then encased in brickwork and lined with pitch to form a waterproof membrane. A concrete "buster slab" is inserted between the top of the bunker and the surface to protect from incoming ordnance. The bunker was created by one continuous pour of concrete and gravel which cost £1.5 million in 1953 (equivalent to £36 m in 2025).

Between 1958 and 1975 the bunker site and RAF Holmpton and the domestic accommodation located further west at RAF Patrington were known collectively as RAF Patrington. When the domestic site closed, the bunker site reverted to being called RAF Holmpton. In the late 1960s it became a Master Comprehensive Radar Station trialling the Ericsson 'Fire Brigade Auto Intercept Radar System', and housed a massive Elliott & Plessey computer system for the 'Linesman Radar Project'. The 200 feet (61 m) tower, which weighed 200 tonnes (220 tons), was dismantled in January 1971. All radar functions at the site closed in 1973, and for the next few years the site was used for training.

Between 1966 and 1974 a Gloster Meteor aircraft (WS788) was the gate guardian at Patrington. It was moved to become the gate guardian at RAF Leeming, as of No. 264 Sqn.

== Command and Control Information System ==
In the 1980s, the bunker was converted to form the new Emergency War Headquarters for RAF Support Command. However with the end of the Cold War in 1991 this function ceased and the site returned to training until 1994, when it was given a major refurbishment to become the first experimental (trialling) headquarters for the new UK Air CCIS system Electronic Warfare Advanced Communications System. This function remained at RAF Holmpton until 2002; the CCIS Operations Room, known as AREA 7, remained intact until the end of July 2012.

== Royal Observer Corps ==
Throughout its years as a Radar Station and through the years of Support Command & CCIS, the site also contained an operations area for the Royal Observer Corps (ROC); the Corps was 'stood down' in 1992 with some ROC units remaining as NBC cells until the end of 1995. This made RAF Holmpton one of the last places in the UK where any members of the Royal Observer Corps served, and is a unique part of the site's history. In 1997 this project was abandoned and the site was then maintained under contract until 2003 by AQUMEN Defence. During this time it was used for occasional training by the RAF Regiment & the TA. In 2003 the site was leased for 25 years by the Ministry of Defence to RL(FRAFS)BLC Limited, and the day-to-day management passed to HIPPO (The Holmpton Initiative Project Planning Office). A public exhibition on the site opened to visitors in 2004.

== Private ownership ==
In 2012, as a result of Government cutbacks and following a review of the Defence Estate, the Ministry of Defence decided that the site was no longer required by the Air Force, and in 2014 the lease was terminated and the whole site sold to RL(FRAFS)BLC, which already held the original 25-year lease. Public visits continued during the period of transition, until 21 December 2014. The site was closed and completely refurbished during 2015, reopening on 23 March 2016.

During the COVID-19 pandemic the bunker closed, but in 2023 re-opened for occasional visits with some members of the original ROC volunteers on duty.
