= Rochdale by-election =

Rochdale by-election may refer several by-elections in Rochdale, Lancashire, England:

- 1940 Rochdale by-election, following the resignation of William Kelly; an unopposed war-time election
- 1958 Rochdale by-election, following the death of Wentworth Schofield; the first televised election in the UK
- 1972 Rochdale by-election, following the death of Jack McCann; Cyril Smith was elected
- 2024 Rochdale by-election, following the death of Tony Lloyd; George Galloway was elected
