= Cyril Smith =

British politician and sex offender (1928–2010)

Sir Cyril Smith MBE DL
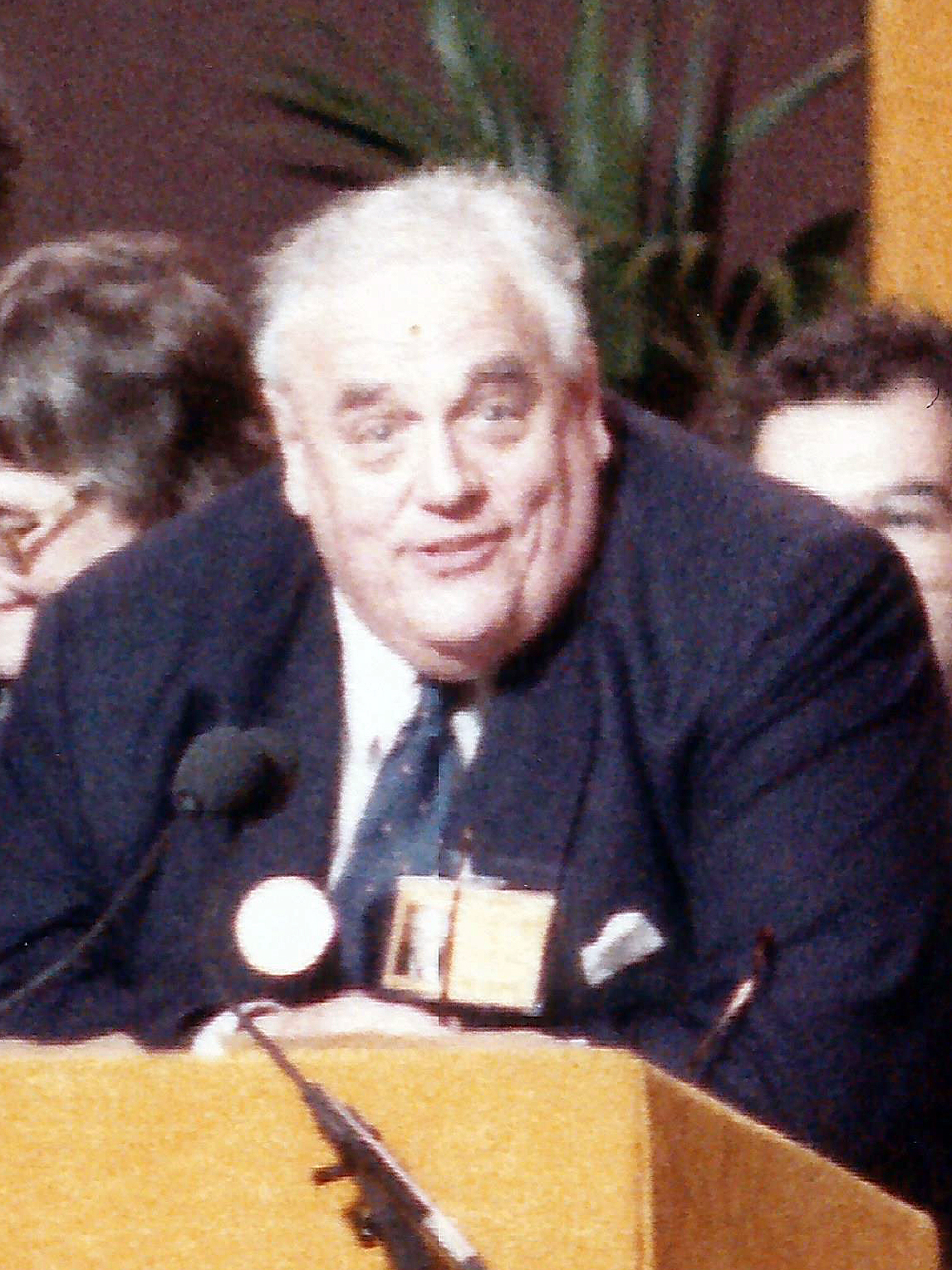
- Smith addressing the Liberal Party Assembly in 1987

Liberal Chief Whip
- In office 7 July 1976 – 1977
- Leader: David Steel
- Preceded by: David Steel
- Succeeded by: Alan Beith

Member of Parliament for Rochdale
- In office 26 October 1972 – 16 March 1992
- Preceded by: Jack McCann
- Succeeded by: Liz Lynne

Personal details
- Born: Cyril Richard Smith; 28 June 1928 Rochdale, Lancashire, England
- Died: 3 September 2010 (aged 82) Rochdale, England
- Party: Liberal (1945–51; 1968–88); Labour (1952–66); Independent (1966–70); Liberal Democrats (1988–2010)
- Occupation: Politician

Sir Cyril Richard Smith MBE DL (28 June 1928 – 3 September 2010) was a British Liberal Party and Liberal Democrat politician who served as Member of Parliament (MP) for Rochdale from 1972 to 1992.

Smith was first active in local politics as a Liberal in 1945 before switching to Labour in 1950; he served as a Labour councillor in Rochdale, Lancashire, from 1950 and became mayor in 1966. He subsequently switched parties again and entered Parliament as a Liberal in 1972, winning his Rochdale seat on five further occasions. He was appointed the Liberal Chief Whip in June 1975 but later resigned on health grounds. In his later years as an MP, he opposed an alliance with the Social Democratic Party and did not stand for re-election in 1992; however, he remained loyal to the Liberal Democrats upon the parties' merger. Throughout much of his career, he maintained a high profile in the media and became a well-known public figure.

In later years, Smith's public esteem was considerably marred by the allegation that he had been involved in a cover-up of a health risk at a local asbestos factory. In 2008, there were calls for him to be stripped of his knighthood after it was revealed that he had asked the asbestos company Turner & Newall to prepare a speech for him in 1981 in which he declared that "the public at large are not at risk from asbestos". It was later revealed that he owned 1,300 shares in the company.

As early as 1979, a local underground magazine, the Rochdale Alternative Paper, alleged that in the 1960s Smith had spanked and sexually abused teenage boys in a hostel that he co-founded. The story was repeated by the magazine Private Eye. After his death, despite denials by his family, formal allegations of child sexual abuse were made against him, leading authorities to conclude that he was a prolific sex offender. In 2012, the Crown Prosecution Service (CPS) formally admitted that Smith should have been charged with such abuse during his lifetime. In November 2012, Greater Manchester Police Assistant Chief Constable Steve Heywood said there was "overwhelming evidence" that Smith had sexually and physically abused young boys.

In April 2014, it was reported that there had been 144 complaints against Smith from victims as young as eight years of age. Attempts to prosecute him had been blocked. Public authorities including Rochdale Borough Council, the police, and British intelligence services have been implicated in covering up Smith's alleged crimes. In 2015, it emerged that he had been arrested in the early 1980s in relation to some of these offences; however, a high-level cover-up reportedly led to destruction of evidence, his release within hours, and the invocation of the Official Secrets Act to prevent the investigating officers from discussing the matter. In February 2017, Greater Manchester Police reported that their investigation into historical child sex abuse at the former Knowl View School in Rochdale, requested by the Home Office in 2014, had found no evidence of a cover-up or corruption.

== Early years ==
Cyril Smith was born in Rochdale, Lancashire, a mill town near Manchester that is known as the birthplace of the co-operative movement. Smith described himself as "illegitimate, deprived and poor". Though he never knew the name of his father, he commented, "I suspect I know who he was." Smith lived with his mother Eva, grandmother and two half-siblings, Eunice and Norman, in a one-up one-down cottage (demolished in 1945) on Falinge Road. Eva Smith was a domestic worker for a local cotton mill–owning family.

Smith was educated at Rochdale Grammar School for Boys. After leaving school, he began work at the Rochdale Inland Revenue Tax Office. In the 1945 general election, aged 16, he gave a public speech in support of Liberal candidate Charles Harvey. Smith said he was given an ultimatum by his manager in the tax office to either choose the civil service or politics. He left his job at the tax office and then worked as an office boy at Fothergill & Harvey's mill in Littleborough. The mill was owned by the Harveys, a notable Liberal family, but Smith claimed the director Charles Harvey knew nothing of his job application.

Smith was a lifelong member of the Rochdale Unitarian Church. Contemporaries remembered him expressing, as a teenager, the desire to be both mayor and Member of Parliament (MP). Smith served in many roles, including as Sunday School superintendent, trustee, and chair of the trustees. His Unitarian faith intersected with his Liberal politics. Smith credited the church with "helping develop his fiercely independent and anti-establishment streak".

== Political career ==
=== Early career ===
Smith joined the Liberal Party in 1945 and was a member of the National Executive Committee of the Young Liberals in 1948 and 1949. From 1948 to 1950, he was Liberal agent in Stockport, but after the party suffered poor election results in 1950 and 1951, he was advised by the losing Liberal candidate for Stockport, Reg Hewitt, to join the Labour Party.

In 1952, Smith was elected a Labour councillor for the Falinge ward of Rochdale. By 1954, he was chairman of Rochdale Council's Establishment Committee. In 1963, Smith switched committee roles to be responsible for Estates which included overseeing residential and town centre development. He was appointed the Labour Mayor of Rochdale in 1966, with his mother, Eva, acting as mayoress (she retained her job as a cleaner in Rochdale Town Hall whilst in the post). In her work as a cleaner at the town hall, Smith's mother was banned from entering the police station – likewise based in the building – because she would search through its bins for information to help her son.

Smith's mayoral duties were filmed for the BBC's Man Alive documentary series, in an episode titled "Santa Claus for a Year". In 1966 he was appointed chairman of the Education Committee overseeing the introduction of comprehensive education in the district. In the same year he was appointed Member of the Order of the British Empire (MBE) in the Queen's Birthday Honours. According to his autobiography, Smith was found guilty of an offence relating to public lotteries and bound over to keep the peace for twelve months.

In 1966, Smith resigned the Labour whip when the party refused to vote for an increase in council house rents and sat with four other councillors as independents until 1970. He rejoined the Liberals in a personal capacity in 1968, which caused surprise to those who remembered his role in opposing Ludovic Kennedy, the Liberal candidate in the 1958 Rochdale by-election. Controversy was sparked by many Rochdale Liberals when their parliamentary candidate, Garth Pratt, was deselected to make way for Smith in advance of the 1970 general election.

During the 1960s Smith was active on many Rochdale Council committees regarding youth activities. These included: Rochdale Youth Orchestra, Rochdale Youth Theatre Workshop, governorship of 29 Rochdale schools and chairmanship of the Youth Committee, Youth Employment Committee and the Education Committee.

=== Member of Parliament ===
Having been Liberal candidate in Rochdale in 1970, when he took the party to second place, Smith won the seat at the 1972 by-election with a large swing from Labour to the Liberals, and a majority of 5,171.

Smith was appointed as the party Chief Whip in June 1975, and faced pressure from the press in the wake of a scandal involving party leader Jeremy Thorpe. Smith was in hospital when Thorpe sacked him, just before he himself was forced to resign. Speaking to Granada Television in 2003, David Steel reflected on events in the 1970s with the conclusion: "Cyril was not an ideal Chief Whip because he did not handle a crisis well and had a tendency to say anything to a news camera." Smith was the only Liberal MP during his parliamentary career to advocate the return of the death penalty. One of his constituents was jailed for sixteen years for the sexual murder of a child, in what turned out to be a miscarriage of justice. The man's mother repeatedly approached Smith for help, but he declined to take the case on.

In 1978, Smith approached former Conservative Prime Minister Ted Heath to discuss forming a new centrist party. In 1980, Smith described UK unemployment figures of two million jobless people as "a disgrace", stating: "They represent a sick society, and are not acceptable to live with." In 1981, he was involved in moves to create "a party with a new image" but, according to the Rochdale Observer, at the foundation of the Social Democratic Party (SDP) in 1981 he warned Liberal colleagues to move with caution. Smith was quoted as being "opposed to an alliance at any price". He would later express the view that the Liberal Party would have been "better off" without being "shackled to the SDP". After David Alton's 1988 bill to reduce the time limit for abortions was talked out by MPs, he referred to other members as "murderers in the womb". The speaker of the House of Commons forced Smith to apologise for the comment.

Smith did not stand again at the 1992 election, when Liz Lynne held Rochdale for the Liberal Democrats. He retired from active politics.

=== Asbestos ===
In 2008, the New Statesman accused Smith of improper conduct in his connection with the company Turner & Newall (T&N), which was based in his constituency, and was once the world's largest manufacturer of materials using asbestos. In the summer recess of 1981, Smith wrote to Sydney Marks, head of personnel at T&N, informing him that EEC regulations were coming up for debate in the next parliamentary session. A House of Commons speech Smith delivered was almost identical to one prepared for him by the company. He said "the public at large are not at risk from asbestos" in his speech about a substance then long-known to be lethal if inhaled. A year later he revealed he owned 1,300 shares in T&N. Interviewed in September 2008 by a local BBC news programme, Smith responded to the claims he had helped cover up the dangers of asbestos as "absolute rubbish". In 2008, he said that 4,000 asbestos-related deaths a year in the UK was "relatively low". After his death, he was described by journalist Oliver Kamm in his blog in The Times as "a corrupt, mendacious mountain of flesh".

The controversy led, in November 2008, to a parliamentary early day motion that Smith be stripped of the knighthood he had been granted in 1988. Kevin Maguire of the Daily Mirror supported the idea.

== Later years ==
After leaving Westminster and the death of his mother Eva in 1994, Smith was invited by a lifelong friend, a public relations manager at the Cunard Line, to become a guest lecturer on the cruise liner Queen Elizabeth 2. Smith liked to spend his holidays at Lytham St Annes, a seaside resort near Blackpool.

In February 2006, Smith was taken to hospital after collapsing at his Rochdale home. He had been weakened by dehydration and low potassium levels.

Smith died of cancer in a Rochdale nursing home on 3 September 2010. He had made detailed plans for his own funeral, which was held in the Great Hall of Rochdale Town Hall and included David Alton, the MEP Chris Davies, and former MP Paul Rowen as speakers. Of all the many tributes, the then-current leader of Rochdale Council summed him up: "He simply was politics for Rochdale." The service was led by the minister of his local Unitarian church, of which he had been a lifelong member.

Smith's younger brother Norman followed him into local politics, as councillor, mayor, and president of the local Liberal Democrat chapter.

== Popular image ==
Smith's large size and capacity for blunt speaking and popular touch made him one of the most recognisable British politicians of the 1970s and 1980s. His nickname, "Big Cyril", was the title of his autobiography. Smith made many popular television appearances: he sang "She's a Lassie from Lancashire" on his friend Jimmy Savile's early-1970s TV show Clunk Click, appeared in an advert for a "greatest hits" album by 1980s pop group Bananarama, and sang a duet with Don Estelle in a 1999 recording of the Laurel and Hardy song "The Trail of the Lonesome Pine". Like several other prominent British MPs in the 1980s, he was regularly parodied in the satirical television show Spitting Image.

Smith is believed to have been the heaviest British MP ever: at 6 ft 2 in (188 cm), he was reported to weigh 29 stone 12 pounds (190 kg; 418 lb). A common joke on the size of the Parliamentary Liberal Party in the early 1970s was that only one taxi would be needed to transport the entire party; after Smith's election, the party could fill two taxis.

A lifelong bachelor, Smith told You magazine: "I haven't had a lot of time for courting women ... I've tended to be married to politics". Smith was a friend of the mother of broadcasters Andy and Liz Kershaw; she described him as dependent on Valium, but he denied these allegations.

== Allegations of child sexual abuse ==
=== Early allegations ===
In May 1979, a local underground magazine, the Rochdale Alternative Paper, alleged that in the 1960s Smith had spanked and sexually abused teenage boys in a hostel he co-founded. The matter was investigated by the police, but Smith was not prosecuted. The story was repeated in the same month by the magazine Private Eye. Smith never publicly denied the accusations of abuse nor took legal action in response to those accusations. After his death, the allegations were denied by his family.

=== 2012 ===
In November 2012, speaking in the House of Commons, Simon Danczuk, the Labour MP for Rochdale, Smith's former seat, called for an inquiry into alleged acts of abuse by Smith.

Rossendale councillor Alan Neal alleged that at the age of eleven in 1964, during Smith's membership of the Labour Party, he was beaten by Smith at a hostel for boys. Neal said: "I'm speaking now because someone has taken a right decision to raise this issue with the authorities". He added that he told police about the incident in 1968 when he left the school, but that when he did so, "everyone made the same comment that the person in question was a very important, powerful man". Neal said that he lost two front teeth and needed stitches to a head wound after Smith assaulted him for refusing to eat a potted meat sandwich.

Another alleged victim of abuse by Smith waived his right to anonymity in November 2012 to claim that Smith smacked him and stroked his buttocks when he was a teenager at a Rochdale care home in the 1960s. Barry Fitton said he was spanked "very, very hard" by Smith and that he was left in tears by the alleged incident.

On 21 November 2012, Greater Manchester Police announced it would investigate allegations that Smith had sexually abused boys at a hostel in Rochdale after 1974, and Lancashire Police would investigate claims dating from before 1974. The police said it would look at whether investigations had taken place into Smith during the 1980s and 1990s.

On 27 November 2012, the Crown Prosecution Service (CPS) said that Smith should have been charged with crimes of abuse more than 40 years earlier. In a statement, Greater Manchester Police said Smith had committed "physical and sexual abuse". Smith was never charged, although investigations were undertaken in 1970, 1998, and 1999. The method of assessing the probability of a conviction has changed since 1970, and the decision not to charge Smith then necessitated the outcome of the 1998 investigation. Following the sexual abuse allegations, Rochdale Council removed a blue plaque to Smith from the town hall. Greater Manchester Police Assistant Chief Constable Steve Heywood said: "Although Smith cannot be charged or convicted posthumously, from the overwhelming evidence we have it is right and proper we should publicly recognise that young boys were sexually and physically abused".

On 28 November 2012, an alleged victim waived his right to anonymity in a television interview with Sky News to say that he was sexually abused by Smith at a council-run residential special school. Chris Marshall broke down in tears during his interview when describing the sexual abuse he said took place at Knowl View school in Rochdale in the early 1980s. He said that as a nine-year-old boy he was taken to a room and made to perform oral sex on Smith and one other man. Smith was a governor at the school and allegedly had his own set of keys. Liberal Democrat leader Nick Clegg said: "I am deeply shocked and horrified by these terrible allegations and my thoughts are with the victims who had the courage to speak out".

In November 2012, Tony Robinson, a former Special Branch officer with Lancashire Police in the 1970s, said that a dossier of sexual abuse allegations against Smith which police claimed was "lost" was actually seized by MI5. Robinson said that he was asked by MI5 to send to London a police dossier that had been kept in a safe in his office which he said was "thick" with allegations from boys claiming they had been abused by Smith.

In December 2012, Rochdale MP Simon Danczuk alleged that Smith raped some of his victims. Danczuk said: "There is no doubt that Cyril Smith seriously sexually abused young boys: why the CPS didn't prosecute more recently is puzzling".

Following claims by MP Tom Watson of "a powerful paedophile network linked to Parliament and No 10", it was reported that Scotland Yard detectives investigating allegations of child abuse at the Elm Guest House were looking into allegations that senior politicians abused children in the 1980s and escaped justice.

=== 2013 ===
In January 2013, The Independent on Sunday reported that police were investigating claims that Smith sexually abused boys at a London guest house. A spokesman for the Metropolitan Police later said: "We can confirm Cyril Smith visited the premises." A 16-year-old boy was allegedly sexually abused by Smith at Elm Guest House. MP Simon Danczuk said he was convinced that there was a "network of paedophiles" operating in the House of Commons who helped to protect Smith.

In September 2013, a Channel 4 Dispatches programme "The Paedophile MP: How Cyril Smith Got Away With It" quoted CPS as claiming that they had not prosecuted Smith for crimes of abuse because he had been given an assurance in 1970 that he would not be prosecuted, and that prevented them from subsequently reopening the investigation under the law at the time. Political journalist Francis Wheen said that he found this explanation incomprehensible.

=== 2014 ===
Danczuk, with researcher and campaigner Matthew Baker, published Smile for the Camera: The Double Life of Cyril Smith, an exposé of the child abuse committed by Smith. Danczuk alleged that Smith was part of a high-level paedophile ring and that Smith had used his influence to escape prosecution. Danczuk said: "Once you looked beyond the jolly clown playing for the camera, there was a sickening, dark heart. This wasn't just about abuse, it was about power – and a cover-up that reached from Rochdale all the way to the very top of the Establishment." Danczuk said that in the 1980s police discovered child sexual abuse material belonging to Smith, but he escaped justice. Danczuk described Smith as "a predatory paedophile and a prolific offender who would target the most vulnerable boys." He said: "A lot of manpower went into investigating Smith over the years, but the only thing he was ever convicted for was mis-selling a lottery ticket."

In 2014, David Steel, the former Liberal leader, said he had confronted Smith about his "unusual" behaviour with boys at a hostel in Rochdale. Following allegations published in 1979, Steel said that Smith confessed to spanking boys and conducting intimate "medical examinations" on them but was allowed to remain as a Liberal MP. Steel said: "I asked Cyril Smith about it. I was half expecting him to say it was all wrong, and I would have been urging him to sue to save his reputation. To my surprise he said the report was correct." Steel said that Smith had a supervisory role in institutions in Rochdale where he was involved in corporal punishment. Steel said of the abuse allegations: "They had been investigated by the police, as Private Eye stated, and no action had been taken on them. So there was nothing more I could do."

In April 2014, following reports that there had been 144 complaints against Smith and that attempts to prosecute him had always been blocked, the President of the Liberal Democrats, Tim Farron, said that his party needed to answer "serious questions" about who knew that Smith had faced allegations of sexual assault. However, Liberal Democrat leader Nick Clegg refused to hold an inquiry into what he called the "repugnant" actions of Smith. Clegg said: "My party, the Liberal Democrats, did not know about these actions." Clegg stated that the child abuse allegations were a matter for the police.

In May 2014, it was alleged that Smith had molested an 11-year-old boy at the National Liberal Club in London in 1978. Smith allegedly insisted that the boy remove his underpants before attempting to fondle him. A spokesman for the Liberal Democrats said: "Cyril Smith's acts were vile and repugnant and we have nothing but sympathy for those whose lives he ruined."

In June 2014, Detective Chief Superintendent Russ Jackson of Greater Manchester Police admitted the force's previous investigations into abuse linked to Smith at Rochdale Knowl View residential school "fell well short" of what would be expected today. Allegations were made that a paedophile ring had been operating for decades in Rochdale and that men from as far away as Sheffield were travelling to Rochdale to have sex with Knowl View boys aged between eight and thirteen. Greater Manchester Police said there were 21 suspects, 14 of whom it had identified, including Smith. In July 2014, Rochdale council's inquiry into child abuse linked to Smith at Knowl View residential school was halted at the request of police. Greater Manchester Police asked the authority to suspend their inquiry while detectives investigated claims of an institutional cover-up. The investigation found no evidence of a cover-up.

In July 2014, it was reported that Smith had put pressure on the BBC in 1976 by asking the corporation not to investigate the "private lives of certain MPs". According to letters in the National Archives, Smith wrote to BBC Director-General Sir Charles Curran in September 1976 saying he was "deeply concerned about the investigative activities of the BBC", especially relating to "the private lives of certain MPs". Former children's minister Tim Loughton described Smith's letters as "bully-boy tactics". Loughton said: "It was an abuse of position that somebody as an MP was saying, 'You shouldn't look at us, we're above the law.'"

A report released by the CPS in July 2014 showed that in 1970 a police detective investigating Smith presented evidence to his superior of Smith's abuse of young boys at a care home in Rochdale, but no action was taken.

=== 2015 ===
In March 2015, Cabinet Office papers were released confirming that Prime Minister Margaret Thatcher was made aware of allegations against Smith before he was knighted in 1988, although she gave him the "benefit of the doubt" because the Director of Public Prosecutions had previously investigated him and had decided not to prosecute him due to lack of evidence. Shortly after, a BBC investigation on Newsnight revealed that Smith had been arrested in the early 1980s in relation to his participation in a paedophile ring, but a high-level cover-up reportedly led to him being released within hours, the evidence destroyed and the investigating officers prevented from discussing the matter under the Official Secrets Act. Theresa May, the Home Secretary, called for immunity for whistle-blowers in the case. Reports also emerged of Smith's arrest by Northamptonshire Police, where he was again released in mysterious circumstances.

In 2015, a retired police officer said that he was threatened with the Official Secrets Act after he found Smith in the home of a known sex offender with two drunk teenage boys and a police sergeant in civilian clothes. The retired officer said that he was summoned to a meeting with a senior officer at Stockport Police Station and told "in no uncertain terms" not to say anything about it. The alleged incident took place in 1988 at a house in Stockport after a complaint that the occupant had committed a lewd act in his window in front of a newspaper boy.

=== 2018 ===
The Independent Inquiry into Child Sexual Abuse published a Cambridge House, Knowl View and Rochdale Investigation Report in April 2018.

== Honours ==
- Cyril Smith was appointed an MBE in 1966.
- He was invested as a Serving Brother of the Order of St John in 1976.
- He served as Deputy Pro Chancellor of Lancaster University from 1978 to 1985.
- He was made a Knight Bachelor in 1988, allowing him to be known as Sir Cyril Smith.
- He was appointed a deputy lieutenant of Greater Manchester in 1991, allowing him the Post Nominal Letters "DL" for Life.
- He was awarded the Freedom of the Borough of Rochdale in November 1992. After a series of allegations of child sexual abuse, over a span of 30 years, came to light following his death, he was posthumously stripped of this honour by a unanimous vote of Rochdale Borough Council on 18 October 2018.
- He was awarded the honorary degree of Doctor of Laws by Lancaster University in 1993. Owing to the allegations of child sexual abuse this honorary degree was posthumously revoked in May 2021.

The Cabinet Office stated in September 2021, with reference to his appointment as MBE and knighthood, that "The Forfeiture Committee can confirm that had Cyril Smith been convicted of the crimes of which he is accused, forfeiture proceedings would have commenced."

== See also ==
- Westminster paedophile dossier

== Bibliography ==
- Smith, Cyril (1977). Big Cyril: Autobiography. W. H. Allen. ISBN 0-491-02261-1.
- Reflections from Rochdale: As I Saw it and as I See it (1997) ISBN 1-85187-340-6. A later slimmer autobiographical work.
- "Cyril Smith", entry by Tim Farron in Brack et al. (eds.) Dictionary of Liberal Biography (Politico's, 1998)
- Danczuk, Simon; Baker, Matthew (2014). Smile for the Camera: The Double Life of Cyril Smith. Biteback. ISBN 978-1-84954-644-7.

Parliament of the United Kingdom
Preceded by Jack McCann	Member of Parliament for Rochdale; 1972–1992	Succeeded by Liz Lynne
Party political offices
Preceded by David Steel	Liberal Chief Whip; 1976–77	Succeeded by Alan Beith
