= Gordon Harvey =

Member of Parliament for Rochdale
- In office 12 January 1906 – 14 December 1918
- Preceded by: Clement Royds
- Succeeded by: Alfred Law

Personal details
- Born: 31 December 1858; Manchester, Lancashire, England
- Died: 6 November 1922 (aged 63); Windermere, Westmorland, England
- Political party: Liberal

Alexander Gordon Cummins Harvey (31 December 1858 – 6 November 1922) was a British cotton manufacturer and merchant and Liberal politician.

== Career ==
Gordon Harvey (as he was usually known) was born in Manchester the son of Cummins Harvey who was a partner in the cotton yarn and cloth manufacturing firm of Fothergill and Harvey. Gordon Harvey himself went on to become the head of an important firm of cotton spinners, manufacturers and merchants with mills at Littleborough and with warehouses and offices in Manchester.

== Politics ==
=== Lancashire County Council ===
A Liberal in politics, and sometime Chairman of Middleton Division Liberal Association, Harvey was elected to Lancashire County Council in the year after its creation and was later made an Alderman of the county. He remained chairman of the county education committee up until the time of his death. He also served as a Justice of the Peace in Lancashire.

=== Parliament ===
Harvey first stood for Parliament at the Khaki election of 1900 as Liberal candidate for Rochdale. The election was fought in the jingoistic atmosphere of the Second Boer War which favoured the Conservatives. Despite taking the anti-war side Harvey still managed to come within 19 votes of beating the sitting Conservative MP, Clement Royds.

General election 1900: Rochdale
Party	Candidate	Votes	%	±%
Conservative	Clement Royds	5,204	46.1	0.0
Liberal	Alexander Gordon Cummins Harvey	5,185	45.9	+4.0
Labour	C A Clarke	901	8.0	
Majority		19	0.2	−4.0
Turnout		11,290	87.1	−1.1
Conservative hold		Swing		

Harvey was elected as MP for Rochdale, however, at the 1906 general election beating Royds, who had held the seat since 1895, by 1,463 votes.

General election 1906: Rochdale
Party	Candidate	Votes	%	±%
Liberal	Alexander Gordon Cummins Harvey	5,912	45.9	0.0
Conservative	Clement Royds	4,449	34.6	−11.5
Independent Labour	Samuel George Hobson	2,506	19.5	
Majority		1,463	11.3	
Turnout		12,867	93.0	+5.9
Liberal gain from Conservative		Swing		

He held the seat at the general elections of January

General election January 1910: Rochdale
Party	Candidate	Votes	%	±%
Liberal	Alexander Gordon Cummins Harvey	6,809	48.8	+2.9
Conservative	W B Boyd-Carpenter	5,581	38.6	+2.0
Social Democratic Federation	Dan Irving	1,755	12.6	
Majority		1,428	10.2	−1.1
Turnout		13,945	93.5	+0.5
Liberal hold		Swing		

and December 1910.

General election December 1910: Rochdale
Party	Candidate	Votes	%	±%
Liberal	Alexander Gordon Cummins Harvey	5,373	44.6	−4.2
Conservative	N Cockshutt	4,850	40.9	+2.3
Social Democratic Federation	Dan Irving	1,901	14.5	+1.9
Majority		477	3.7	−6.5
Turnout		11,124	88.0	−5.5
Liberal hold		Swing		

He was on the extreme pacifist wing of the party and led the opposition to increased naval spending as World War One approached. The economist Francis Hirst wrote an approving biography of him.

Harvey was interested in the environment and in being a benevolent employer and some of his public works still survive in Littleborough.

== Death ==
Harvey was obliged to stand down from Parliament at the 1918 general election because of a disease of the throat, presumably cancer. He had to undergo two operations as a result but died at Windermere from the illness aged 63 years.

His family remained active in Liberal politics, his nephew Charles standing unsuccessfully for Rochdale in 1945 and another nephew Alexander sponsoring the young Cyril Smith to become a Liberal agent.

Parliament of the United Kingdom
Preceded by Clement Royds	Member of Parliament for Rochdale; 1906–1918	Succeeded by Alfred Law
