= 1972 Rochdale by-election =

British parliamentary contest in Greater Manchester

← 1972	26 October 1972	Feb. 1974 →

Constituency of Rochdale
- Turnout: 69.10% (▼3.70%)
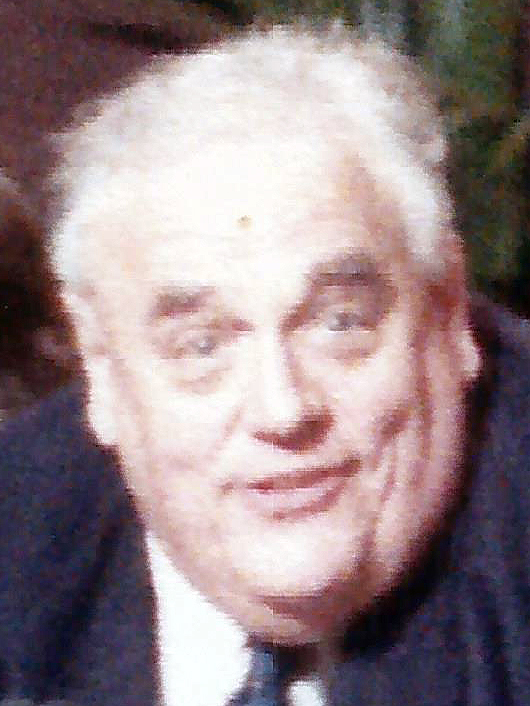
	First party	Second party
		Lab
Candidate	Cyril Smith	Lawrence Cunliffe
Party	Liberal	Labour
Popular vote	19,296	14,203
Percentage	42.29%	31.12%
Swing	▲11.89%	▼10.45%
	Third party	Fourth party
	Con	Ind.
Candidate	David Trippier	Jim Merrick
Party	Conservative	Independent
Popular vote	8,060	4,074
Percentage	17.66%	8.93%
Swing	▼10.37%	N/A
MP before election
Jack McCann
Labour
Subsequent MP
Cyril Smith
Liberal

The 1972 Rochdale by-election, was a parliamentary by-election held on 26 October 1972 for the UK House of Commons constituency of Rochdale.

The by-election took place during the 1970s Liberal revival, in one of the few Labour-held seats in which the Liberal Party was in second place. This was the first Liberal gain during the 1970–1974 Parliament.

== Previous MP ==
The seat had become vacant when the constituency's Labour Member of Parliament (MP), John "Jack" McCann (4 December 1910 – 16 July 1972), died.

McCann first contested the Rochdale seat for Parliament in 1955 without success. He was first elected in a 1958 by-election following the death of the sitting Conservative MP Wentworth Schofield. In that by-election the Liberal candidate had finished second, during the late 1950s Liberal revival that culminated in the victory at the 1958 Torrington by-election, the next month. The Liberals had finished second to McCann in three out of the four subsequent general elections, including that of 1970.

== Candidates ==
Four candidates were nominated. The list below is set out in descending order of the number of votes received at the by-election.

The Liberal Party candidate was Cyril Smith (28 June 1928 – 3 September 2010). He was a prominent local politician, who had been a Labour Mayor of the town in 1966–67. Smith joined the Liberal Party in 1967. He had finished second in the seat at the 1970 general election. Smith won the by-election and retained the constituency until he retired from Parliament in 1992. He was the Liberal Chief Whip 1975–76.

Representing the Labour Party was Lawrence Cunliffe (born 25 March 1929). He again contested Rochdale in the February 1974 general election. Cunliffe was elected MP for Leigh in 1979 and sat for the seat until he retired in 2001.

The Conservative candidate was David Trippier, born in 1946. He was a stockbroker and Rochdale councillor. He contested Oldham West in both 1974 general elections. Trippier became the Member of Parliament for Rossendale from 1979 to 1983, and for Rossendale and Darwen from 1983 until he lost his seat in 1992.

Jim Merrick, the chairman of the British Campaign to Stop Immigration, was from Bradford and issued leaflets headed "Enoch is right". Muhammad Anwar notes that this likely caused the Asian vote, then the total population of Pakistanis at around 6,000, to increase in participation in response.

== Result ==
1972 by-election: Rochdale
Party	Candidate	Votes	%	±%
Liberal	Cyril Smith	19,296	42.29	+11.89
Labour	Lawrence Cunliffe	14,203	31.12	−10.45
Conservative	David Trippier	8,060	17.66	−10.37
Independent	Jim Merrick	4,074	8.93	New
Majority		5,093	11.17	N/A
Turnout		45,633	69.10	−3.70
Registered electors		66,081		
Liberal gain from Labour		Swing		

== See also ==
- Rochdale constituency
- List of United Kingdom by-elections
- United Kingdom by-election records
