= Thomas Bayley Potter =

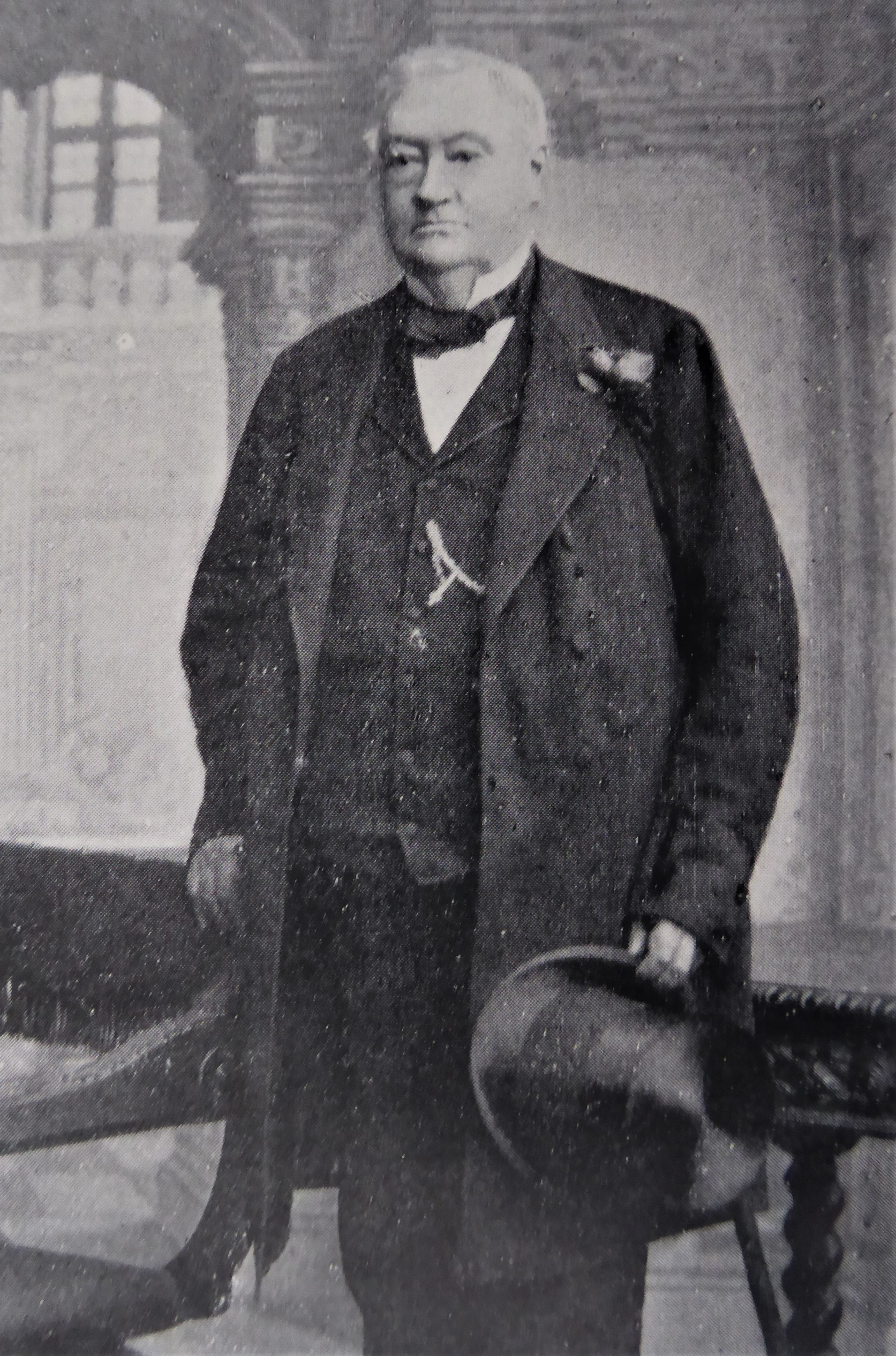
Thomas Bayley Potter

Thomas Bayley Potter DL, JP (29 November 1817 – 6 November 1898) was an English merchant in Manchester and Liberal Party politician.

== Early life ==
Born in Polefield, Lancashire, he was the second son of Sir Thomas Potter and his wife Esther Bayley, daughter of Thomas Bayley, and younger brother of Sir John Potter. Potter received his early education in George Street, Manchester, then at Lant Carpenter's school in Bristol. He subsequently attended Rugby School under Thomas Arnold and then University College London.

== In business ==
On graduating, Bayley went into the family business in Manchester. His father died in 1845, at Buile Hill, his home. His elder brother John, knighted in 1851, took over most of his father's role; the firm then traded as Potter & Norris. Thomas became the major partner in it when his brother Sir John died in 1858. He brought in as partner Francis Taylor (1818–1872), who had worked for Potter & Norris, around 1865, and the firm traded as Potter & Taylor. Not long after Taylor's death, Potter withdrew from business activity, to concentrate on politics.

== Liberal politics ==
Potter became Chairman of the Manchester branch of the Complete Suffrage Society in 1830. While he was generally aligned with the Radicals, there was a rift between their leaders John Bright and Richard Cobden over the Crimean War, which the Potter brothers supported; and Sir John Potter successfully stood against Bright in 1857. Potter, who was in many ways a follower of Cobden, tried to smooth matters over at the end of the 1850s.

In 1863 Potter was the founder and president of the Union and Emancipation Society. Initially simply the Emancipation Society, it was prompted by Lincoln's Emancipation Proclamation that had freed enslaved people on 1 January 1863. Potter put his own money into the organisation, which adopted the pamphleteering publicity tactics of the Anti-Corn Law League, and ran frequent meetings. It was joined by prominent supporters of the Union in the American Civil War, including Edward Dicey, J. S. Mill and Goldwin Smith.

In 1865, Potter entered the British House of Commons and sat as Member of Parliament (MP) for Rochdale. This was the seat of Cobden, who had died that year. Potter kept it until 1895. In the House of Commons he was known as "Principles Potter".

Potter established the Cobden Club in 1866 and was honorary secretary until his death. He had proposed a "political science association" in a letter to J. S. Mill of 1864, taking as model the Social Science Association. It operated as a publisher, funded education in economics, and held an annual dinner, under a name suggested by Thorold Rogers. It was fundamentalist about free trade.

A personal friend of Giuseppe Garibaldi, Potter also supported Italian unification. The finance for Garibaldi's purchase of the island of Caprera was arranged at a dinner given by him.

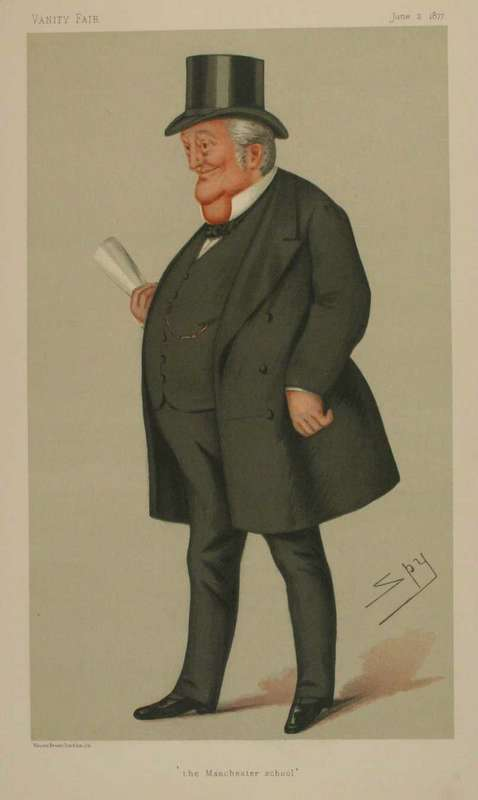
"the Manchester school" Potter as caricatured by Spy (Leslie Ward) in Vanity Fair, June 1877

== Last years ==
Potter was a Justice of the Peace for Manchester and Lancashire, and for the latter also Deputy Lieutenant. He sold the Buile Hill mansion to the Bennett family, and in 1902 it was purchased by Salford Council.

At the end of his life Potter spent his vacations in Cobden's old home, The Hurst, at Midhurst in Sussex. He died there on 6 November 1898, aged 80, and was buried in Heyshott four days later.

== Family ==
Potter was twice married:

- Firstly, on 5 February 1846, to Mary Ashton, daughter of Samuel Ashton, at the Unitarian Chapel of Gee Cross. She died in 1885, at Cannes. Mary Potter was one of those petitioning in 1867 for a suffrage society in Manchester.
- Secondly, on 10 March 1887, to Helena Hicks, daughter of John Hicks Bodmin, at St Paul's Church, Lambeth, Surrey.

Potter had four sons and a daughter by his first wife. The third and fourth sons, Arthur and Richard, and the daughter Edith, survived their father.

Thomas and Mary Potter were in the Unitarian congregation of Cross Street Chapel. William Gaskell was an assistant minister there, to John Gooch Robberds, from 1828 to 1854 when Robberds died; his wife Elizabeth Gaskell published her first novel Mary Barton in 1848. Mary Potter perceived a upsetting connection between the murder of her brother Thomas Ashton in 1831, a result of industrial tensions, and the novel's murder plot. The author denied any conscious use of Thomas Ashton's story, of which she knew, but the Potter family saw the plot device as referring deliberately to it.

=== Richard Ellis Potter ===
The fourth son, Richard Ellis Potter (1855–1947), was educated at Eton College, and at age 17 took part in the third of Benjamin Leigh Smith's expeditions, in 1873 to Svalbard. Letters that he wrote to his father remain.

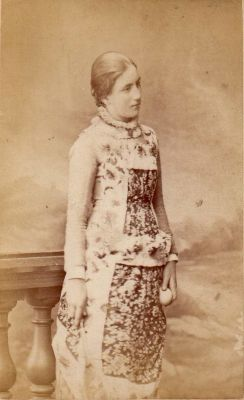
Harriot Kingscote

He was in Dallas in the 1880s, where he worked for Texas Land & Mortgage, a Scottish company managed by the Irish Courtenay Wellesley, as a valuer of land, and helped introduce the games of lawn tennis and golf to the city. He and his brother Arthur were both left money in 1887 under the will of George Scrivens, a family connection. He married Harriott Isabel Kingscote in 1899, and was father of Arthur Kingscote Potter.

In later life Potter resided at Ridgewood, Almondsbury, in Gloucestershire. He became a Fellow of the Royal Geographical Society in 1899.

Parliament of the United Kingdom
Preceded by Richard Cobden	Member of Parliament for Rochdale; 1865 – 1895	Succeeded by Clement Royds
