= Rochdale Alternative Paper =

Alternative newspaper published in England (1971–1983)

- Founder(s): David Bartlett and John Walker
- Editor: Collectively edited
- Founded: November 1971
- Ceased publication: 1983
- Political alignment: Socialism
- City: Rochdale, Greater Manchester
- Country: England
- Circulation: 8,000 (maximum)
- Readership: 40,000 (est.)

== History ==
Rochdale Alternative Paper (RAP) was an approximately monthly alternative newspaper, first published in 1971 in Rochdale, Greater Manchester, England. One of the small, co-operatively produced local papers in England that played an important role in radical politics after 1968, it came to wider prominence in 1979 through its exposure of the sexual abuse perpetrated by Cyril Smith, Rochdale's Liberal Democrat member of parliament. However, with the exception of the satirical and investigative magazine, Private Eye, no other media took this story up and it was only after Smith's death that the allegations were given widespread coverage and the police admitted that he should have been prosecuted.

== The paper ==
Rochdale Alternative Paper was a monthly alternative newspaper that was started in November 1971 by two college lecturers, David Bartlett and John Walker, with the aim of targeting what they saw as local self-interested politicians and local business people that held the wealth and influence in Rochdale. They were opposed to the established Rochdale Observer, which they viewed as patronising, blinkered and biased. For the first 32 issues, the RAP was printed at the Manchester community printshop, Moss Side Press, which offered offset lithography printing, before they set up their own press, the Rochdale Alternative Press, initially in the basement of Bartlett's house. The paper was printed on A3 paper, which was folded. This was considered to be the best size to sit on newsagents' shelves and thus encourage them to stock it. RAP closed in 1983, although the printing press continued as a commercial endeavour into the 21st century, printing for charities and voluntary organizations.

Bartlett and Walker have said that they set up RAP as an antidote to boredom. They were loosely Marxist and wanted to do something about social change at a local level. They met once a week in a local pub and asked anyone who was interested in helping out to join them there. The first print run was 1,500, increasing to 8,000 by 1980, which they calculated probably gave them a readership of about 40,000, a significant number for a town the size of Rochdale, with a population then of around 95,000. Producing and distributing the paper to newsagents was carried out Bartlett and Walker and their supporters.

The paper only once used the front page for a story, with the founders preferring to use it instead to print catchy headlines or to show photographs and other illustrations. They believed that having a news story on the front page would date the monthly paper too quickly. Unlike some other alternative papers of the time, such as Brighton Voice, the RAP did not have a local university that could provide a ready market for sales, which meant that it had to broaden its appeal, with implications for content, style and marketing. It developed a detailed database, using an index-card system with over 4000 cards, recording details such as biographies, companies in the area, planning applications, and house sales, with the aim of saving research time if the information recorded ever became useful to write stories.

== The Cyril Smith affair ==
In May 1979, the paper published a lengthy article quoting in detail affidavits from five teenage boys who had alleged having been stripped and spanked by Cyril Smith 15 years earlier. Prior to publication, Bartlett and Walker had the article cleared legally by three lawyers. They also sought Smith's comments in advance of publication but, instead, received a pre-writ document that threatened legal action, which they decided to ignore. Despite all of the legal advice received, Bartlett has stated that he was very concerned that he could lose his house and other assets if Smith took the paper to court.

Other than Private Eye and to a lesser extent the New Statesman, no paper or magazine with national circulation picked the story up and no action was taken by the police. Smith was made a Knight Bachelor by the prime minister, Margaret Thatcher, in 1988, despite having had her attention drawn to the allegations. Rochdale council made Smith a freeman of the borough and named a room in the town hall after him. It was only after Smith's death in 2010 and after the emergence of the first revelations about the sexual abuse carried out by the TV entertainer, Jimmy Savile, that the abuse carried out by Smith received wider circulation. The Independent Inquiry into Child Sexual Abuse, published in October 2022, speculated on why the national media had not publicised the case. The members of the inquiry considered that fear of legal action was an unlikely reason and noted that the media may have considered the abuse insufficiently important or that the press did not wish to offend Smith who "regularly provided the press with blunt comments, gossip and stories".

== Closure ==
The paper closed in 1983 after having produced around 112 issues.

== See also ==
- List of underground newspapers of the 1960s counterculture
