= Rochdale (constituency) =

Parliamentary constituency in the United Kingdom, 1832 onwards

Coordinates: 53°37′N 2°10′W

- County constituency for the House of Commons
- Interactive map of boundaries since 2024
- Location within North West England
- County: Greater Manchester
- Electorate: 71,697 (March 2020)
- Major settlements: Rochdale, Littleborough, Wardle

Current constituency
- Created: 1950
- Member of Parliament: Paul Waugh (Labour Co-op)
- Seats: One

1832–1950
- Seats: One
- Type of constituency: Borough constituency
- Created from: Lancashire

Rochdale is a constituency, which has been represented in the House of Commons of the Parliament of the United Kingdom by Paul Waugh of Labour Co-op since 2024. Rochdale has elected one Member of Parliament (MP) in every general election since its creation in 1832. (Note: A county constituency (for the purposes of election expenses and type of returning officer). As with all constituencies, the constituency elects one member of Parliament (MP) by the first past the post system of election at least every five years.)

== Constituency profile ==
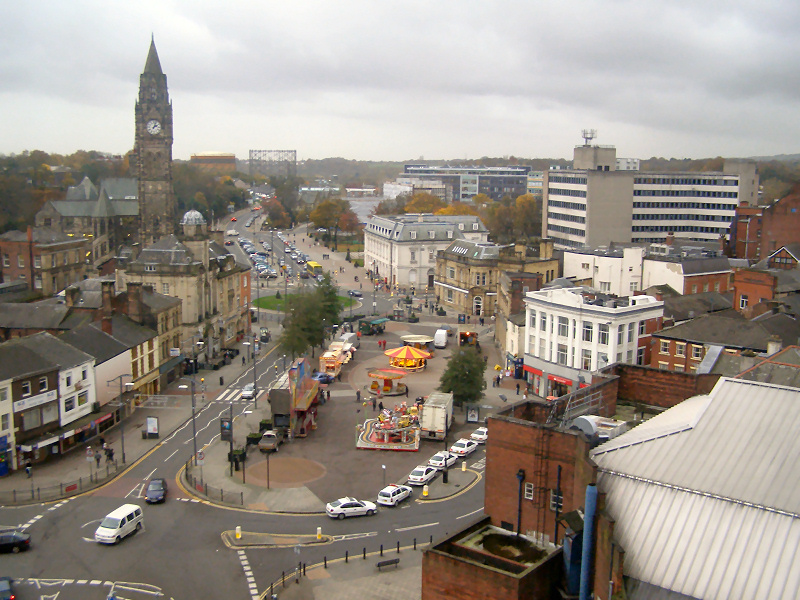
Rochdale town centre

Rochdale is a constituency in Greater Manchester in North West England within the Metropolitan Borough of Rochdale. It covers the centre and east of the town of Rochdale, including the neighbourhoods of Shawclough, Wardleworth, Buckley, Belfield, Smallbridge and Balderstone. The constituency also covers the outlying towns and villages to the east of Rochdale, including Milnrow, Littleborough and Wardle.

Rochdale is a large town in the foothills of the Pennines that, like much of Greater Manchester and Lancashire, has an industrial heritage. It was one of the first industrialised towns and was a centre for textile manufacturing, especially wool and cotton. The decline of industry in the late 20th century left Rochdale highly-deprived which it remains today; most of the town falls within the top 10% most-deprived areas in England. Most residents live in dense terraced or semi-detached housing, largely built to accommodate industrial workers, and the average house price is around half the UK average.

Rochdale has a young average age with a low proportion of retirees. Residents have low levels of income and homeownership and the child poverty rate is double the UK-wide figure. They have low levels of education and a high proportion work in the health, retail and manufacturing sectors. The percentage of residents claiming unemployment benefits is almost twice the overall UK rate. White people made up 63% of the population at the 2021 census. Asians, mostly of Pakistani origin, were the largest ethnic minority group at 29%. The Asian population was concentrated in the centre of Rochdale where they made up a majority of residents, whilst the outlying towns of Milnrow and Littleborough were over 90% White.

At the local borough council, most of the constituency is represented by Labour Party councillors with some Liberal Democrats in Milnrow, Workers Party representatives in the town centre and Reform UK councillors elected at the most recent election in 2026. An estimated 56% of voters in Rochdale supported leaving the European Union in the 2016 referendum, higher than the UK-wide rate of 52%.

== Boundaries ==
=== Historic ===
Map of 2010-2024 boundaries

As there were no township boundaries in 1832, the original constituency was defined as a circular area in a radius of three-quarters of a mile from the old market place in Rochdale. In 1868 the boundary was extended to include Wardleworth, Spotland, Wuerdle, Belfield, Newbold, Buersill, and Marland.

1918–1950: The County Borough of Rochdale

1950–1983: As prior but with redrawn boundaries

1983–1997: The Borough of Rochdale wards of Balderstone, Brimrod and Deeplish, Castleton, Central and Falinge, Healey, Newbold, Norden and Bamford, Smallbridge and Wardleworth, and Spotland

1997–2010: The Borough of Rochdale wards of Balderstone, Brimrod and Deeplish, Central and Falinge, Healey, Littleborough, Newbold, Smallbridge and Wardleworth, Spotland, and Wardle

2010–2024: The Borough of Rochdale wards of Balderstone and Kirkholt, Central Rochdale, Healey, Kingsway, Littleborough Lakeside, Milkstone and Deeplish, Milnrow and Newhey, Smallbridge and Firgrove, Spotland and Falinge, and Wardle and West Littleborough

=== Current ===
Further to the 2023 review of Westminster constituencies which came into effect for the 2024 general election, the constituency was reduced in size to bring the electorate within the permitted range by transferring the Spotland and Falinge ward (as it existed on 1 December 2020) to the renamed constituency of Heywood and Middleton North.

== History ==
Rochdale in Lancashire, boundaries used 1974–83

Rochdale was one of the constituencies created by the Reform Act 1832, and was a Labour Party/Liberal Democrat marginal for many years, although it was held by the Conservatives for part of the 1950s, until a 1958 by-election.

It was held for two decades by Cyril Smith, first of the Liberal Party and then of the Liberal Democrats. He won a by-election in 1972, taking the seat from Labour, and held it until his retirement in 1992. After Smith's death it emerged that he had been a serial child abuser.

Since Smith's retirement, contests have been tighter. The Liberal Democrats held the seat with Liz Lynne at the 1992 general election, but lost to Labour's Lorna Fitzsimons at the 1997 election. However, the Liberal Democrats regained the seat at the 2005 election, with Paul Rowen.

In 2010, the town was brought to national attention when the then Prime Minister Gordon Brown was caught on a tape recording describing a local woman, Gillian Duffy, as a "bigot" after having a conversation with her while campaigning (later described as Bigotgate by the UK media). Despite this unfavourable publicity, Labour still managed to narrowly win the seat from the Liberal Democrats; and in 2015 achieved their highest majority in the seat's history, with the Liberal Democrats falling to fourth place.

=== Demographics ===
The population was recorded as 114,386 in 2021. The ethnic composition was 62.7% White, 29.6% Asian, Asian British or Asian Welsh, and 3.1% Black, Black British, Black Welsh, Caribbean or African. The religious composition was 38.1% Christian, 30.5% Muslim, and 0.9% other. 26.0% claimed no religious affiliation.

== Members of Parliament ==
| Election | Member (†=died in office) | Party |
|---|---|---|
| 1832 | John Fenton | Whig |
| 1835 | John Entwistle | Conservative |
| 1837 | John Fenton | Whig |
| 1841 | William Sharman Crawford | Radical |
| 1852 | Edward Miall | Radical |
| 1857 | Alexander Ramsay | Conservative |
| 1859 | Richard Cobden | Liberal |
| 1865 | Thomas Potter | Liberal |
| 1895 | Clement Royds | Conservative |
| 1906 | Gordon Harvey | Liberal |
| 1918 | Alfred Law | Unionist |
| 1922 | Stanley Burgess | Labour |
| 1923 | Ramsay Muir | Liberal |
| 1924 | William Kelly | Labour |
| 1931 | Thomas Jesson | Conservative |
| 1935 | William Kelly | Labour |
| 1940 by-election | Hyacinth Morgan | Labour |
| 1950 | Joseph Hale | Labour |
| 1951 | Wentworth Schofield † | Conservative |
| 1958 by-election | Jack McCann † | Labour |
| 1972 by-election | Cyril Smith | Liberal |
| 1988 | Cyril Smith | Liberal Democrats |
| 1992 | Liz Lynne | Liberal Democrats |
| 1997 | Lorna Fitzsimons | Labour |
| 2005 | Paul Rowen | Liberal Democrats |
| 2010 | Simon Danczuk | Labour |
| 2015 | Simon Danczuk | Independent |
| 2017 | Tony Lloyd † | Labour |
| 2024 by-election | George Galloway | Workers Party |
| 2024 | Paul Waugh | Labour Co-op |

== Results ==
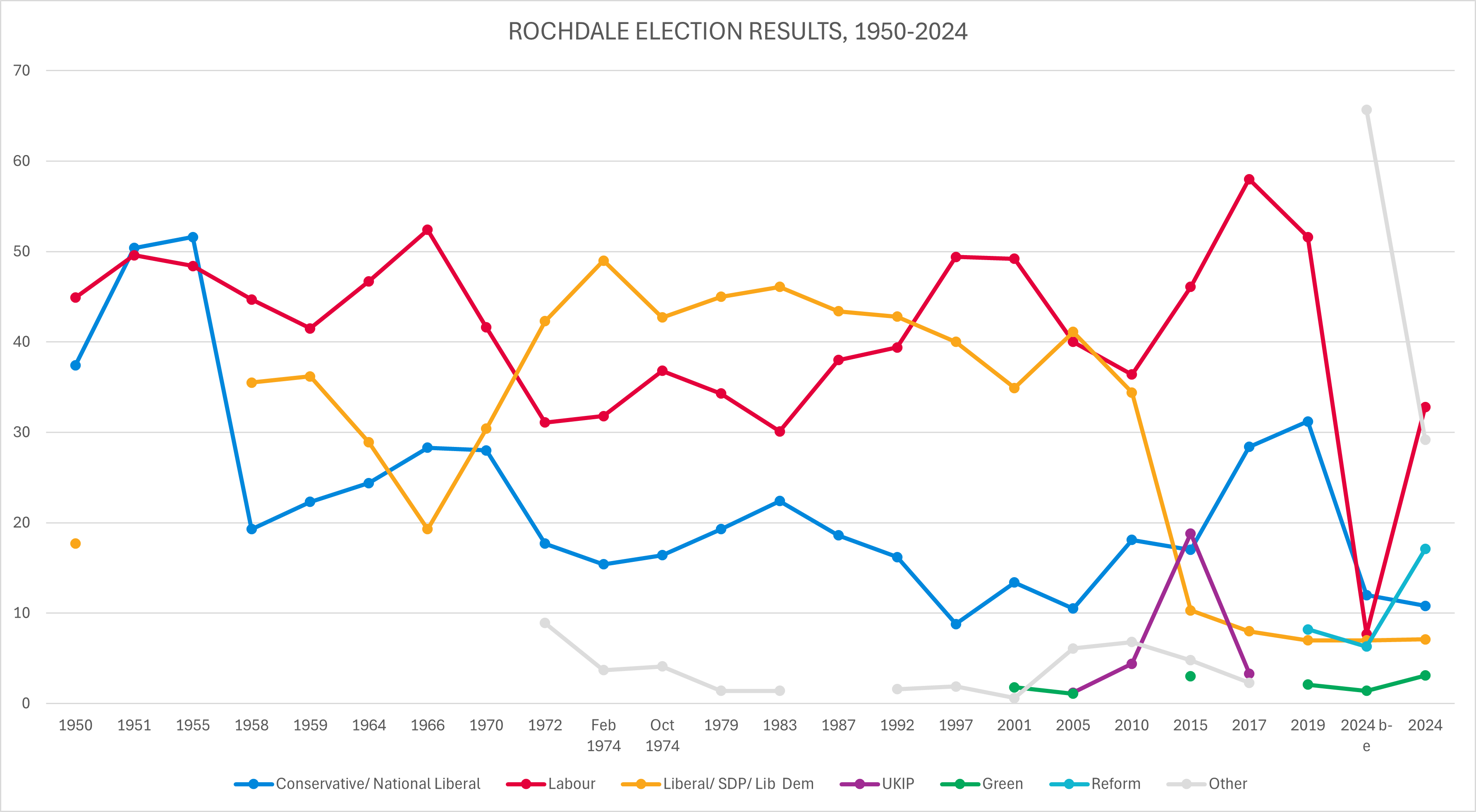
Election results 1983-2024

=== Elections in the 2020s ===
General election 2024: Rochdale
| Party | Candidate | Votes | % | ±% |
|---|---|---|---|---|
| Labour Co-op | Paul Waugh | 13,027 | 32.8 | −18.0 |
| Workers Party | George Galloway | 11,587 | 29.2 | N/A |
| Reform | Michael Howard | 6,773 | 17.1 | +8.9 |
| Conservative | Paul Ellison | 4,273 | 10.8 | −20.8 |
| Liberal Democrats | Andy Kelly | 2,816 | 7.1 | −0.4 |
| Green | Martyn Savin | 1,212 | 3.1 | +1.2 |
| Majority | | 1,440 | 3.6 | –15.7 |
| Turnout | | 39,688 | 55.7 | –3.0 |
| Registered electors | | 71,264 | | |
| Labour Co-op gain from Workers Party | | Swing | | |

Vote share changes for the 2024 election are compared to the notional results from the 2019 election, not the 2024 by-election.

2024 Rochdale by-election
| Party | Candidate | Votes | % | ±% |
|---|---|---|---|---|
| Workers Party | George Galloway | 12,335 | 39.7 | N/A |
| Independent | David Tully | 6,638 | 21.3 | N/A |
| Conservative | Paul Ellison | 3,731 | 12.0 | −19.2 |
| Labour (Note: Ali was suspended from the Labour Party on 12 February 2024, after nominations closed on 2 February, so he was still identified as the Labour Party candidate on the ballot paper.) | Azhar Ali | 2,402 | 7.7 | −43.9 |
| Liberal Democrats | Iain Donaldson | 2,164 | 7.0 | ±0.0 |
| Reform | Simon Danczuk | 1,968 | 6.3 | −1.9 |
| Independent | William Howarth | 523 | 1.7 | N/A |
| Independent | Mark Coleman | 455 | 1.5 | N/A |
| Green (Note: The Green Party withdrew Otten's endorsement on 7 February 2024, after nominations closed on 2 February, so he was still identified as the Green Party candidate on the ballot paper.) | Guy Otten | 436 | 1.4 | −0.7 |
| Independent | Michael Howarth | 246 | 0.8 | N/A |
| Monster Raving Loony | Ravin Rodent Subortna | 209 | 0.7 | N/A |
| Majority | | 5,697 | 18.4 | N/A |
| Turnout | | 31,107 | 39.7 | −20.4 |
| Registered electors | | 78,801 | | |
| Workers Party gain from Labour | | Swing | | |

=== Elections in the 2010s ===
2019 notional result
| Party | Vote | % |
|---|---|---|
| Labour | 21,379 | 50.8 |
| Conservative | 13,270 | 31.6 |
| Brexit Party | 3,451 | 8.2 |
| Liberal Democrats | 3,168 | 7.5 |
| Green | 790 | 1.9 |
| Turnout | 42,058 | 58.7 |
| Electorate | 71,697 | |

General election 2019: Rochdale
| Party | Candidate | Votes | % | ±% |
|---|---|---|---|---|
| Labour | Tony Lloyd | 24,475 | 51.6 | –6.4 |
| Conservative | Atifa Shah | 14,807 | 31.2 | +2.8 |
| Brexit Party | Chris Green | 3,867 | 8.2 | N/A |
| Liberal Democrats | Andy Kelly | 3,312 | 7.0 | –1.0 |
| Green | Sarah Croke | 986 | 2.1 | N/A |
| Majority | | 9,668 | 20.4 | –9.2 |
| Turnout | | 47,447 | 60.1 | –4.0 |
| Labour hold | | Swing | –4.6 | |

General election 2017: Rochdale
| Party | Candidate | Votes | % | ±% |
|---|---|---|---|---|
| Labour | Tony Lloyd | 29,035 | 58.0 | +11.9 |
| Conservative | Jane Howard | 14,216 | 28.4 | +11.4 |
| Liberal Democrats | Andy Kelly | 4,027 | 8.0 | –2.3 |
| UKIP | Christopher Baksa | 1,641 | 3.3 | –15.5 |
| Independent | Simon Danczuk | 883 | 1.8 | N/A |
| Greater Manchester Homeless Voice | Andy Littlewood | 242 | 0.5 | N/A |
| Majority | | 14,819 | 29.6 | +2.3 |
| Turnout | | 50,044 | 64.1 | +6.7 |
| Labour hold | | Swing | | |

General election 2015: Rochdale
| Party | Candidate | Votes | % | ±% |
|---|---|---|---|---|
| Labour | Simon Danczuk | 20,961 | 46.1 | +9.7 |
| UKIP | Mohammed Masud | 8,519 | 18.8 | +14.4 |
| Conservative | Azi Ahmed | 7,742 | 17.0 | –1.1 |
| Liberal Democrats | Andy Kelly | 4,667 | 10.3 | –24.1 |
| Rochdale First | Farooq Ahmed | 1,535 | 3.4 | N/A |
| Green | Mark Hollinrake | 1,382 | 3.0 | N/A |
| National Front | Kevin Bryan | 433 | 1.0 | –3.9 |
| Islam Zinda Baad Platform | Mohammed Salim | 191 | 0.4 | –0.8 |
| Majority | | 12,442 | 27.3 | +25.3 |
| Turnout | | 45,430 | 57.4 | –0.7 |
| Labour hold | | Swing | –2.3 | |

General election 2010: Rochdale
| Party | Candidate | Votes | % |
|---|---|---|---|
| Labour | Simon Danczuk | 16,699 | 36.4 |
| Liberal Democrats | Paul Rowen | 15,810 | 34.4 |
| Conservative | Mudasir Dean | 8,305 | 18.1 |
| National Front | Chris Jackson | 2,236 | 4.9 |
| UKIP | Colin Denby | 1,999 | 4.4 |
| Islam Zinda Baad Platform | Mohammed Salim | 545 | 1.2 |
| Independent | John Whitehead | 313 | 0.7 |
| Majority | | 889 | 2.0 |
| Turnout | | 45,907 | 58.1 |
| Labour win (new boundaries) | | | |

The Times Guide to the House of Commons 2010 reported that based on the notional 2005 result on the new boundaries the Labour vote had fallen by 4.5% and the Liberal Democrat vote had fallen by 6.1%, while the Conservative voteshare increased by 7.6%.

=== Elections in the 2000s ===
General election 2005: Rochdale
| Party | Candidate | Votes | % | ±% |
|---|---|---|---|---|
| Liberal Democrats | Paul Rowen | 16,787 | 41.1 | +6.2 |
| Labour | Lorna Fitzsimons | 16,345 | 40.0 | –9.2 |
| Conservative | Khalid Hussain | 4,270 | 10.5 | –2.9 |
| BNP | Derek Adams | 1,773 | 4.3 | N/A |
| UKIP | John Whittaker | 499 | 1.2 | N/A |
| Green | Samir Chatterjee | 448 | 1.1 | –0.7 |
| Islam Zinda Baad Platform | Mohammed Salim | 361 | 0.9 | N/A |
| Veritas | Carl Faulkner | 353 | 0.9 | N/A |
| Majority | | 444 | 1.1 | N/A |
| Turnout | | 40,834 | 58.4 | +1.7 |
| Liberal Democrats gain from Labour | | Swing | +7.7 | |

General election 2001: Rochdale
| Party | Candidate | Votes | % | ±% |
|---|---|---|---|---|
| Labour | Lorna Fitzsimons | 19,406 | 49.2 | –0.2 |
| Liberal Democrats | Paul Rowen | 13,751 | 34.9 | –5.1 |
| Conservative | Elaina Cohen | 5,274 | 13.4 | +4.6 |
| Green | Nick Harvey | 728 | 1.8 | N/A |
| Independent | Mohammed Salim | 253 | 0.6 | +0.2 |
| Majority | | 5,655 | 14.3 | +4.9 |
| Turnout | | 39,412 | 56.7 | –13.3 |
| Labour hold | | Swing | | |

=== Elections in the 1990s ===
General election 1997: Rochdale
| Party | Candidate | Votes | % | ±% |
|---|---|---|---|---|
| Labour | Lorna Fitzsimons | 23,758 | 49.4 | |
| Liberal Democrats | Liz Lynne | 19,213 | 40.0 | |
| Conservative | Mervyn Turnberg | 4,237 | 8.8 | |
| BNP | Gary Bergin | 653 | 1.4 | |
| Islam Zinda Baad Platform | Mohammed Salim | 221 | 0.5 | |
| Majority | | 4,545 | 9.4 | |
| Turnout | | 48,082 | 70.0 | |
| Labour win (new boundaries) | | | | |

General election 1992: Rochdale
| Party | Candidate | Votes | % | ±% |
|---|---|---|---|---|
| Liberal Democrats | Liz Lynne | 22,776 | 42.8 | –0.6 |
| Labour | David Williams | 20,937 | 39.4 | +1.4 |
| Conservative | Duncan Goldie-Scott | 8,626 | 16.2 | –2.4 |
| BNP | Ken Henderson | 620 | 1.2 | N/A |
| Natural Law | Vincent J. Lucker | 221 | 0.4 | N/A |
| Majority | | 1,839 | 3.4 | –2.0 |
| Turnout | | 53,180 | 76.5 | +1.9 |
| Liberal Democrats hold | | Swing | –1.0 | |

=== Elections in the 1980s ===
General election 1987: Rochdale
| Party | Candidate | Votes | % | ±% |
|---|---|---|---|---|
| Liberal | Cyril Smith | 22,245 | 43.4 | –2.7 |
| Labour | David Williams | 19,466 | 38.0 | +7.9 |
| Conservative | Clive Condie | 9,561 | 18.6 | –3.8 |
| Majority | | 2,779 | 5.4 | –10.6 |
| Turnout | | 51,272 | 74.6 | +3.8 |
| Liberal hold | | Swing | –5.3 | |

General election 1983: Rochdale
| Party | Candidate | Votes | % |
|---|---|---|---|
| Liberal | Cyril Smith | 21,858 | 46.1 |
| Labour | Valerie Broom | 14,271 | 30.1 |
| Conservative | Alan Fearn | 10,616 | 22.4 |
| National Front | Peter Barker | 463 | 1.0 |
| Unemployed Party | Peter Courtney | 204 | 0.4 |
| Majority | | 7,587 | 16.0 |
| Turnout | | 47,412 | 70.8 |
| Liberal win (new boundaries) | | | |

=== Elections in the 1970s ===
General election 1979: Rochdale
| Party | Candidate | Votes | % | ±% |
|---|---|---|---|---|
| Liberal | Cyril Smith | 22,172 | 45.03 | +2.37 |
| Labour | J Connell | 16,878 | 34.28 | −2.53 |
| Conservative | I S Picton | 9,494 | 19.28 | +2.85 |
| National Front | S Merrick | 690 | 1.40 | 2.69 |
| Majority | | 5,295 | 10.75 | +4.90 |
| Turnout | | 49,234 | 73.66 | +3.38 |
| Liberal hold | | Swing | | |

General election October 1974: Rochdale
| Party | Candidate | Votes | % | ±% |
|---|---|---|---|---|
| Liberal | Cyril Smith | 20,092 | 42.66 | −6.45 |
| Labour | J Connell | 17,339 | 36.81 | +5.00 |
| Conservative | R J de B Young | 7,740 | 16.43 | +2.85 |
| National Front | M W Sellors | 1,927 | 4.09 | +0.43 |
| Majority | | 2,753 | 5.85 | −11.45 |
| Turnout | | 47,098 | 70.28 | −7.07 |
| Liberal hold | | Swing | | |

General election February 1974: Rochdale
| Party | Candidate | Votes | % | ±% |
|---|---|---|---|---|
| Liberal | Cyril Smith | 25,266 | 49.11 | +6.82 |
| Labour | L F Cunliffe | 16,367 | 31.81 | +0.69 |
| Conservative | L Green | 7,933 | 15.42 | −2.24 |
| National Front | M W Sellors | 1,885 | 3.66 | N/A |
| Majority | | 8,899 | 17.3 | +6.13 |
| Turnout | | 49,234 | 73.66 | +3.38 |
| Liberal hold | | Swing | | |

1972 Rochdale by-election
| Party | Candidate | Votes | % | ±% |
|---|---|---|---|---|
| Liberal | Cyril Smith | 19,296 | 42.29 | +11.89 |
| Labour | L F Cunliffe | 14,203 | 31.12 | −10.45 |
| Conservative | D A Tripper | 8,060 | 17.66 | −10.37 |
| Independent | J Merrick | 4,074 | 8.93 | N/A |
| Majority | | 5,093 | 11.17 | 0.00 |
| Turnout | | 45,633 | 69.06 | −3.71 |
| Liberal gain from Labour | | Swing | +11.17 | |

General election 1970: Rochdale
| Party | Candidate | Votes | % | ±% |
|---|---|---|---|---|
| Labour | Jack McCann | 19,247 | 41.57 | −10.82 |
| Liberal | Cyril Smith | 14,076 | 30.40 | +11.13 |
| Conservative | M Andrew | 12,978 | 28.03 | −0.30 |
| Majority | | 5,171 | 11.17 | −12.89 |
| Turnout | | 46,301 | 72.77 | −6.19 |
| Labour hold | | Swing | | |

=== Elections in the 1960s ===
General election 1966: Rochdale
| Party | Candidate | Votes | % | ±% |
|---|---|---|---|---|
| Labour | Jack McCann | 24,481 | 52.39 | +5.70 |
| Conservative | Edward G.L. Collins | 13,239 | 28.33 | +3.96 |
| Liberal | Nancy Seear | 9,004 | 19.27 | –9.67 |
| Majority | | 11,242 | 24.06 | |
| Turnout | | 46,724 | 78.96 | |
| Labour hold | | Swing | | |

General election 1964: Rochdale
| Party | Candidate | Votes | % | ±% |
|---|---|---|---|---|
| Labour | Jack McCann | 22,927 | 46.69 | +5.22 |
| Liberal | Thomas Lyrian Hobday | 14,212 | 28.94 | –7.29 |
| Conservative | Tom Normanton | 11,968 | 24.37 | +2.07 |
| Majority | | 8,715 | 17.75 | |
| Turnout | | 49,107 | 82.26 | |
| Labour hold | | Swing | | |

=== Elections in the 1950s ===
General election 1959: Rochdale
| Party | Candidate | Votes | % | ±% |
|---|---|---|---|---|
| Labour | Jack McCann | 21,689 | 41.47 | –6.98 |
| Liberal | Ludovic Kennedy | 18,949 | 36.23 | N/A |
| Conservative | Tom Normanton | 11,665 | 22.30 | –29.25 |
| Majority | | 2,740 | 5.24 | |
| Turnout | | 52,303 | 85.47 | |
| Labour hold | | Swing | | |

1958 Rochdale by-election
| Party | Candidate | Votes | % | ±% |
|---|---|---|---|---|
| Labour | Jack McCann | 22,133 | 44.66 | −3.79 |
| Liberal | Ludovic Kennedy | 17,603 | 35.52 | N/A |
| Conservative | John E. Parkinson | 9,827 | 19.83 | −31.72 |
| Majority | | 4,530 | 9.14 | N/A |
| Turnout | | 49,563 | | |
| Labour gain from Conservative | | Swing | +14.0 | |

General election 1955: Rochdale
| Party | Candidate | Votes | % | ±% |
|---|---|---|---|---|
| Conservative | Wentworth Schofield | 26,518 | 51.55 | +1.14 |
| Labour | Jack McCann | 24,928 | 48.45 | −1.14 |
| Majority | | 1,590 | 3.10 | +2.28 |
| Turnout | | 51,446 | 82.8 | −2.9 |
| Conservative hold | | Swing | +1.1 | |

General election 1951: Rochdale
| Party | Candidate | Votes | % | ±% |
|---|---|---|---|---|
| Conservative | Wentworth Schofield | 27,797 | 50.41 | |
| Labour | Joseph Hale | 27,343 | 49.59 | |
| Majority | | 454 | 0.82 | N/A |
| Turnout | | 55,140 | 85.66 | |
| Conservative gain from Labour | | Swing | | |

General election 1950: Rochdale
| Party | Candidate | Votes | % |
|---|---|---|---|
| Labour | Joseph Hale | 25,484 | 44.9 |
| Conservative | Wentworth Schofield | 21,208 | 37.4 |
| Liberal | Roger Fulford | 10,042 | 17.7 |
| Majority | | 4,276 | 7.5 |
| Turnout | | 56,734 | 87.90 |
| Labour win (new boundaries) | | | |

=== Elections in the 1940s ===
General election 1945: Rochdale
| Party | Candidate | Votes | % | ±% |
|---|---|---|---|---|
| Labour | Hyacinth Morgan | 22,047 | 44.89 | |
| Conservative | Edward May Nicol | 16,852 | 34.31 | |
| Liberal | Charles Gordon Cummins Harvey | 10,211 | 20.79 | |
| Majority | | 5,195 | 10.58 | |
| Turnout | | 49,110 | 80.68 | |
| Labour hold | | Swing | | |

1940 Rochdale by-election
| Party | Candidate | Votes | % | ±% |
|---|---|---|---|---|
| Labour | Hyacinth Morgan | Unopposed | N/A | N/A |
| Labour hold | | | | |

=== Elections in the 1930s ===
General election 1935: Rochdale
| Party | Candidate | Votes | % | ±% |
|---|---|---|---|---|
| Labour | William Kelly | 22,281 | 41.20 | +8.61 |
| Conservative | W. Gordon Murray | 20,486 | 37.88 | –7.18 |
| Liberal | Elliott Dodds | 11,311 | 20.92 | –1.43 |
| Majority | | 1,795 | 3.32 | N/A |
| Turnout | | 54,078 | 84.69 | |
| Labour gain from Conservative | | Swing | | |

General election 1931: Rochdale
| Party | Candidate | Votes | % | ±% |
|---|---|---|---|---|
| Conservative | Thomas Jesson | 25,346 | 45.06 | |
| Labour | William Kelly | 18,329 | 32.59 | |
| Liberal | Elliott Dodds | 12,572 | 22.35 | |
| Majority | | 7,017 | 12.48 | N/A |
| Turnout | | 56,247 | 88.79 | |
| Conservative gain from Labour | | Swing | | |

=== Elections in the 1920s ===
General election 1929: Rochdale
| Party | Candidate | Votes | % | ±% |
|---|---|---|---|---|
| Labour | William Kelly | 22,060 | 40.2 | +6.4 |
| Liberal | Ramsay Muir | 16,957 | 30.8 | –2.7 |
| Unionist | John Haslam | 15,962 | 29.0 | –3.7 |
| Majority | | 5,103 | 9.4 | +9.1 |
| Turnout | | 54,979 | 87.6 | –2.7 |
| Labour hold | | Swing | +4.5 | |

General election 1924: Rochdale
| Party | Candidate | Votes | % | ±% |
|---|---|---|---|---|
| Labour | William Kelly | 14,609 | 33.8 | +1.2 |
| Liberal | Ramsay Muir | 14,492 | 33.5 | –2.9 |
| Unionist | Thomas Jesson | 14,112 | 32.7 | +1.7 |
| Majority | | 117 | 0.3 | N/A |
| Turnout | | 43,213 | 90.3 | +2.5 |
| Labour gain from Liberal | | Swing | | |

General election 1923: Rochdale
| Party | Candidate | Votes | % | ±% |
|---|---|---|---|---|
| Liberal | Ramsay Muir | 15,087 | 36.4 | +7.2 |
| Labour | Stanley Burgess | 13,525 | 32.6 | –6.2 |
| Unionist | Nicholas Cockshutt | 12,845 | 31.0 | –1.0 |
| Majority | | 1,562 | 3.8 | N/A |
| Turnout | | 41,457 | 87.8 | +0.7 |
| Liberal gain from Labour | | Swing | | |

General election 1922: Rochdale
| Party | Candidate | Votes | % | ±% |
|---|---|---|---|---|
| Labour | Stanley Burgess | 15,774 | 38.8 | +22.3 |
| Unionist | Alfred Law | 13,006 | 32.0 | –15.6 |
| Liberal | Ramsay Muir | 11,894 | 29.2 | +7.7 |
| Majority | | 2,768 | 6.8 | N/A |
| Turnout | | 40,674 | 87.1 | +22.6 |
| Labour gain from Unionist | | Swing | | |

=== Elections in the 1910s ===
Phillipps

General election 1918: Rochdale
| Party | | Candidate | Votes | % | ±% |
|---|---|---|---|---|---|
| C | Unionist | Alfred Law | 14,299 | 47.6 | +6.7 |
| | Liberal | Vivian Phillipps | 6,452 | 21.5 | –23.1 |
| | Labour | R. H. Tawney | 4,956 | 16.5 | N/A |
| | National Democratic | John Joseph Terrett | 2,358 | 7.8 | N/A |
| | National | John Fitzgerald Jones | 1,992 | 6.6 | N/A |
| Majority | | | 7,847 | 26.1 | N/A |
| Turnout | | | 30,057 | 64.5 | –23.5 |
| | Unionist gain from Liberal | | Swing | | |
C indicates candidate endorsed by the coalition government.

A General Election was due to take place by the end of 1915. By the summer of 1914, the following candidates had been adopted to contest that election. Due to the outbreak of war, the election never took place.

- British Socialist Party: Tom Kennedy

General election December 1910: Rochdale
| Party | Candidate | Votes | % | ±% |
|---|---|---|---|---|
| Liberal | Gordon Harvey | 5,850 | 44.6 | –4.2 |
| Conservative | Nicholas Cockshutt | 5,373 | 40.9 | +2.3 |
| Social Democratic Federation | Dan Irving | 1,901 | 14.5 | +1.9 |
| Majority | | 477 | 3.7 | –6.5 |
| Turnout | | 11,124 | 88.0 | –5.5 |
| Liberal hold | | Swing | | |

General election January 1910: Rochdale
| Party | Candidate | Votes | % | ±% |
|---|---|---|---|---|
| Liberal | Gordon Harvey | 6,809 | 48.8 | +2.9 |
| Conservative | William Boyd Boyd-Carpenter | 5,381 | 38.6 | +2.0 |
| Social Democratic Federation | Dan Irving | 1,755 | 12.6 | N/A |
| Majority | | 1,428 | 10.2 | –1.1 |
| Turnout | | 13,945 | 93.5 | +0.5 |
| Liberal hold | | Swing | | |

=== Elections in the 1900s ===
General election 1906: Rochdale
| Party | Candidate | Votes | % | ±% |
|---|---|---|---|---|
| Liberal | Gordon Harvey | 5,912 | 45.9 | 0.0 |
| Conservative | Clement Royds | 4,449 | 34.6 | −11.5 |
| Independent Labour | S. G. Hobson | 2,506 | 19.5 | N/A |
| Majority | | 1,463 | 11.3 | N/A |
| Turnout | | 12,867 | 93.0 | +5.9 |
| Registered electors | | 13,831 | | |
| Liberal gain from Conservative | | Swing | +5.8 | |

General election 1900: Rochdale
| Party | Candidate | Votes | % | ±% |
|---|---|---|---|---|
| Conservative | Clement Royds | 5,204 | 46.1 | 0.0 |
| Liberal | Gordon Harvey | 5,185 | 45.9 | +4.0 |
| Labour Repr. Cmte. | C. Allen Clarke | 901 | 8.0 | –4.0 |
| Majority | | 19 | 0.2 | –4.0 |
| Turnout | | 11,290 | 87.1 | –1.1 |
| Registered electors | | 12,968 | | |
| Conservative hold | | Swing | −2.0 | |

=== Elections in the 1890s ===
General election 1895: Rochdale
| Party | Candidate | Votes | % | ±% |
|---|---|---|---|---|
| Conservative | Clement Royds | 4,781 | 46.1 | +1.0 |
| Liberal | William Leatham Bright | 4,359 | 41.9 | –13.0 |
| Ind. Labour Party | George Barnes | 1,251 | 12.0 | N/A |
| Majority | | 422 | 4.2 | N/A |
| Turnout | | 10,391 | 88.2 | +2.4 |
| Registered electors | | 11,782 | | |
| Conservative gain from Liberal | | Swing | +7.0 | |

General election 1892: Rochdale
| Party | Candidate | Votes | % | ±% |
|---|---|---|---|---|
| Liberal | Thomas Potter | 5,460 | 54.9 | –2.7 |
| Conservative | Clement Royds | 4,480 | 45.1 | +2.7 |
| Majority | | 980 | 9.8 | –5.4 |
| Turnout | | 9,940 | 85.8 | +9.8 |
| Registered electors | | 11,584 | | |
| Liberal hold | | Swing | −2.7 | |

=== Elections in the 1880s ===
General election 1886: Rochdale
| Party | Candidate | Votes | % | ±% |
|---|---|---|---|---|
| Liberal | Thomas Potter | 4,738 | 57.6 | +1.9 |
| Conservative | John Marriott | 3,481 | 42.4 | –1.9 |
| Majority | | 1,257 | 15.2 | +3.8 |
| Turnout | | 9,969 | 76.0 | –16.2 |
| Registered electors | | 10,808 | | |
| Liberal hold | | Swing | +1.9 | |

General election 1885: Rochdale
| Party | Candidate | Votes | % | ±% |
|---|---|---|---|---|
| Liberal | Thomas Potter | 5,552 | 55.7 | −4.5 |
| Conservative | Elliot Lees | 4,417 | 44.3 | +4.5 |
| Majority | | 1,135 | 11.4 | −9.0 |
| Turnout | | 9,969 | 92.2 | +8.7 |
| Registered electors | | 10,808 | | |
| Liberal hold | | Swing | −4.5 | |

General election 1880: Rochdale
| Party | Candidate | Votes | % | ±% |
|---|---|---|---|---|
| Liberal | Thomas Potter | 5,614 | 60.2 | +7.3 |
| Conservative | Richard Wilson Gamble | 3,716 | 39.8 | −7.3 |
| Majority | | 1,898 | 20.4 | +14.6 |
| Turnout | | 9,330 | 83.5 | +1.4 |
| Registered electors | | 11,172 | | |
| Liberal hold | | Swing | +7.3 | |

=== Elections in the 1870s ===
General election 1874: Rochdale
| Party | Candidate | Votes | % | ±% |
|---|---|---|---|---|
| Liberal | Thomas Potter | 4,498 | 52.9 | −4.8 |
| Conservative | Richard Wilson Gamble | 3,998 | 47.1 | +4.8 |
| Majority | | 500 | 5.8 | −9.6 |
| Turnout | | 8,496 | 82.1 | −1.2 |
| Registered electors | | 10,352 | | |
| Liberal hold | | Swing | −4.8 | |

=== Elections in the 1860s ===
General election 1868: Rochdale
| Party | Candidate | Votes | % | ±% |
|---|---|---|---|---|
| Liberal | Thomas Potter | 4,455 | 57.7 | N/A |
| Conservative | William Whitworth Schofield | 3,270 | 42.3 | N/A |
| Majority | | 1,185 | 15.4 | N/A |
| Turnout | | 7,725 | 83.2 | N/A |
| Registered electors | | 9,280 | | |
| Liberal hold | | Swing | N/A | |

General election 1865: Rochdale
| Party | Candidate | Votes | % | ±% |
|---|---|---|---|---|
| Liberal | Thomas Potter | Unopposed | | |
| Registered electors | | 1,358 | | |
| Liberal hold | | | | |

By-election, 15 April 1865: Rochdale
| Party | Candidate | Votes | % | ±% |
|---|---|---|---|---|
| Liberal | Thomas Potter | 646 | 56.6 | N/A |
| Conservative | William Brett | 496 | 43.4 | N/A |
| Majority | | 150 | 13.2 | N/A |
| Turnout | | 1,142 | 84.1 | N/A |
| Registered electors | | 1,358 | | |
| Liberal hold | | Swing | N/A | |

- Caused by Cobden's death.

=== Elections in the 1850s ===
General election 1859: Rochdale
| Party | Candidate | Votes | % | ±% |
|---|---|---|---|---|
| Liberal | Richard Cobden | Unopposed | | |
| Registered electors | | 1,340 | | |
| Liberal gain from Conservative | | | | |

General election 1857: Rochdale
| Party | Candidate | Votes | % | ±% |
|---|---|---|---|---|
| Conservative | Alexander Ramsay | 532 | 52.2 | +10.7 |
| Radical | Edward Miall | 488 | 47.8 | −10.7 |
| Majority | | 44 | 4.4 | N/A |
| Turnout | | 1,020 | 81.3 | +3.4 |
| Registered electors | | 1,255 | | |
| Conservative gain from Radical | | Swing | +10.7 | |

General election 1852: Rochdale
| Party | Candidate | Votes | % | ±% |
|---|---|---|---|---|
| Radical | Edward Miall | 529 | 58.5 | N/A |
| Conservative | Alexander Ramsay | 375 | 41.5 | N/A |
| Majority | | 154 | 17.0 | N/A |
| Turnout | | 904 | 77.9 | N/A |
| Registered electors | | 1,160 | | |
| Radical hold | | Swing | N/A | |

=== Elections in the 1840s ===
General election 1847: Rochdale
| Party | Candidate | Votes | % | ±% |
|---|---|---|---|---|
| Radical | William Sharman Crawford | Unopposed | | |
| Registered electors | | 1,026 | | |
| Radical hold | | | | |

General election 1841: Rochdale
| Party | Candidate | Votes | % | ±% |
|---|---|---|---|---|
| Radical | William Sharman Crawford | 399 | 54.4 | N/A |
| Conservative | James Fenton | 335 | 45.6 | −2.7 |
| Majority | | 64 | 8.8 | N/A |
| Turnout | | 734 | 72.2 | −12.2 |
| Registered electors | | 1,016 | | |
| Radical gain from Whig | | Swing | | |

=== Elections in the 1830s ===
General election 1837: Rochdale
| Party | Candidate | Votes | % | ±% |
|---|---|---|---|---|
| Whig | John Fenton (MP for Rochdale) | 374 | 51.7 | +4.8 |
| Conservative | Alexander Ramsay | 349 | 48.3 | −4.8 |
| Majority | | 25 | 3.4 | N/A |
| Turnout | | 723 | 84.4 | −8.8 |
| Registered electors | | 857 | | |
| Whig gain from Conservative | | Swing | +4.8 | |

By-election, 19 April 1837: Rochdale
| Party | Candidate | Votes | % | ±% |
|---|---|---|---|---|
| Whig | John Fenton (MP for Rochdale) | 383 | 53.0 | +6.1 |
| Conservative | Clement Royds | 339 | 47.0 | −6.1 |
| Majority | | 44 | 6.0 | N/A |
| Turnout | | 722 | 84.2 | −9.0 |
| Registered electors | | 857 | | |
| Whig gain from Conservative | | Swing | +6.1 | |

- Caused by Entwistle's death

General election 1835: Rochdale
| Party | Candidate | Votes | % | ±% |
|---|---|---|---|---|
| Conservative | John Entwistle (politician) | 369 | 53.1 | +14.2 |
| Whig | John Fenton (MP for Rochdale) | 326 | 46.9 | +3.1 |
| Majority | | 43 | 6.2 | N/A |
| Turnout | | 695 | 93.2 | +1.2 |
| Registered electors | | 746 | | |
| Conservative gain from Whig | | Swing | +5.6 | |

General election 1832: Rochdale
| Party | Candidate | Votes | % |
|---|---|---|---|
| Whig | John Fenton (MP for Rochdale) | 277 | 43.8 |
| Tory | John Entwistle (politician) | 246 | 38.9 |
| Radical | James Taylor | 109 | 17.2 |
| Majority | | 31 | 4.9 |
| Turnout | | 632 | 92.0 |
| Registered electors | | 687 | |
| Whig win (new seat) | | | |

== See also ==
- List of parliamentary constituencies in Greater Manchester
- 1940 Rochdale by-election
- 1958 Rochdale by-election
- 1972 Rochdale by-election

== Sources ==
- Election results, 1950–1997 Politics Science Resources (Keele University)
- FWS Craig, British Parliamentary Election Results 1918–1949
- FWS Craig, British Parliamentary Election Results 1885–1918
