= William Kelly (Labour politician) =

British politician

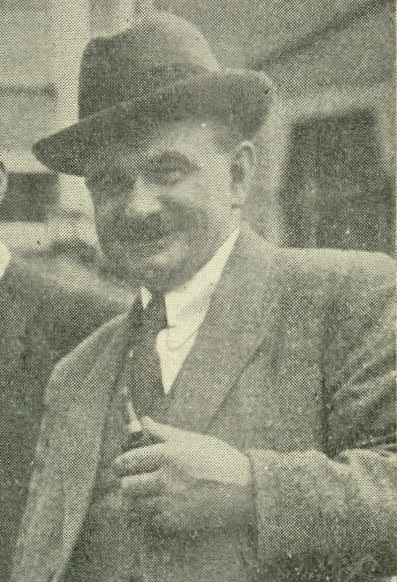
Kelly at the Labour Party conference in 1921

William Thomas Kelly (21 June 1874 – 13 March 1944) was a British Labour politician.

Kelly was active in the Amalgamated Society of Engineers, serving on its Executive Council from 1903 until 1913, and as chair of its Manchester branch. He then found work as a London organiser for the Workers' Union, where his skill at arbitration was recognised. In 1916, the union established an Arbitration Department, headed by Kelly.

Kelly was a supporter of the Labour Party, for which he stood unsuccessfully in Yeovil in 1918, 1922, and twice in 1923. In 1924, he instead contested Rochdale in 1924, for which he was elected, serving until 1931, when he was defeated. He was appointed as an alderman on London County Council in 1934, but this did not stop him from winning the Rochdale seat again in 1935. He resigned in July 1940, but remained on the London County Council until his death, in 1944.

Parliament of the United Kingdom
| Preceded by Ramsay Muir | Member of Parliament for Rochdale; 1924–1931 | Succeeded by Thomas Jesson |
| Preceded by Thomas Jesson | Member of Parliament for Rochdale; 1935–1940 | Succeeded by Hyacinth Morgan |
Trade union offices
| Preceded by Alfred Golightly | Group 3 representative on the Executive Council of the Amalgamated Society of Engineers; 1903–1913 | Succeeded by William Harold Hutchinson |
