= Stanley Burgess =

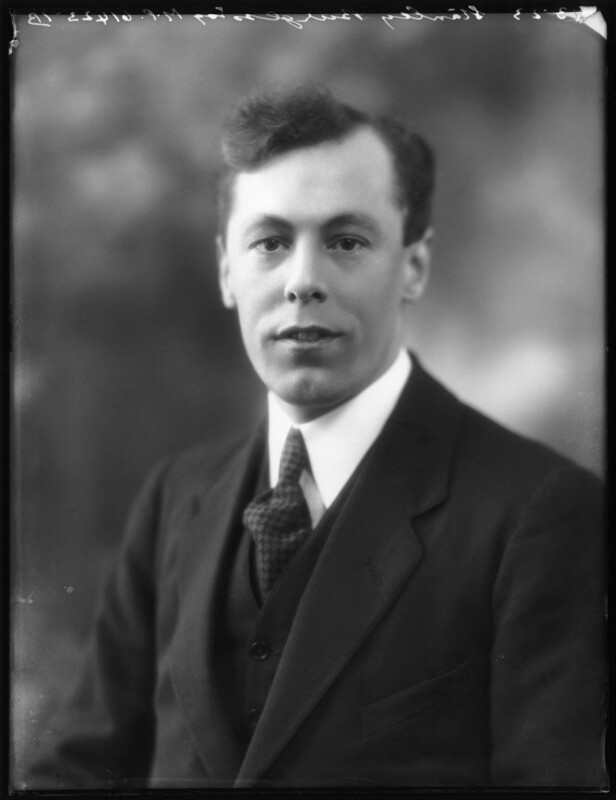
Burgess in 1923

Stanley Burgess (5 December 1889 – 2 June 1972) was a British trade unionist and Labour Party politician, sitting as MP for Rochdale 1922–23.

== Politics ==
At 17, Burgess spoke at Independent Labour Party meetings then moved to the US where he joined Bill Haywood in Pittsburg in 1911 in a mining dispute. He was arrested under the Defence of the Realm Act 1914 for his part in leading a strike of Sheffield engineers in May 1917.

At the 1918 general election, Burgess stood unsuccessfully in the Leith constituency in Scotland. He was elected at the 1922 general election as Member of Parliament for Rochdale in Lancashire, but was defeated at the 1923 election. He did not stand for Parliament again, and returned to his role as a leading official of the Amalgamated Engineering Union.

== Early life and personal life ==
Burgess was born in Ipswich in 1889 to Richard John Burgess and left school at 13. In 1914 he married Ida, the daughter of Thomas Nicholson from Holmesfield, Derbyshire.

He died in Worcester, aged 82.

Parliament of the United Kingdom
Preceded by Alfred Law	Member of Parliament for Rochdale; 1922 – 1923	Succeeded by Ramsay Muir
