= Liz Lynne =

British politician (born 1948)

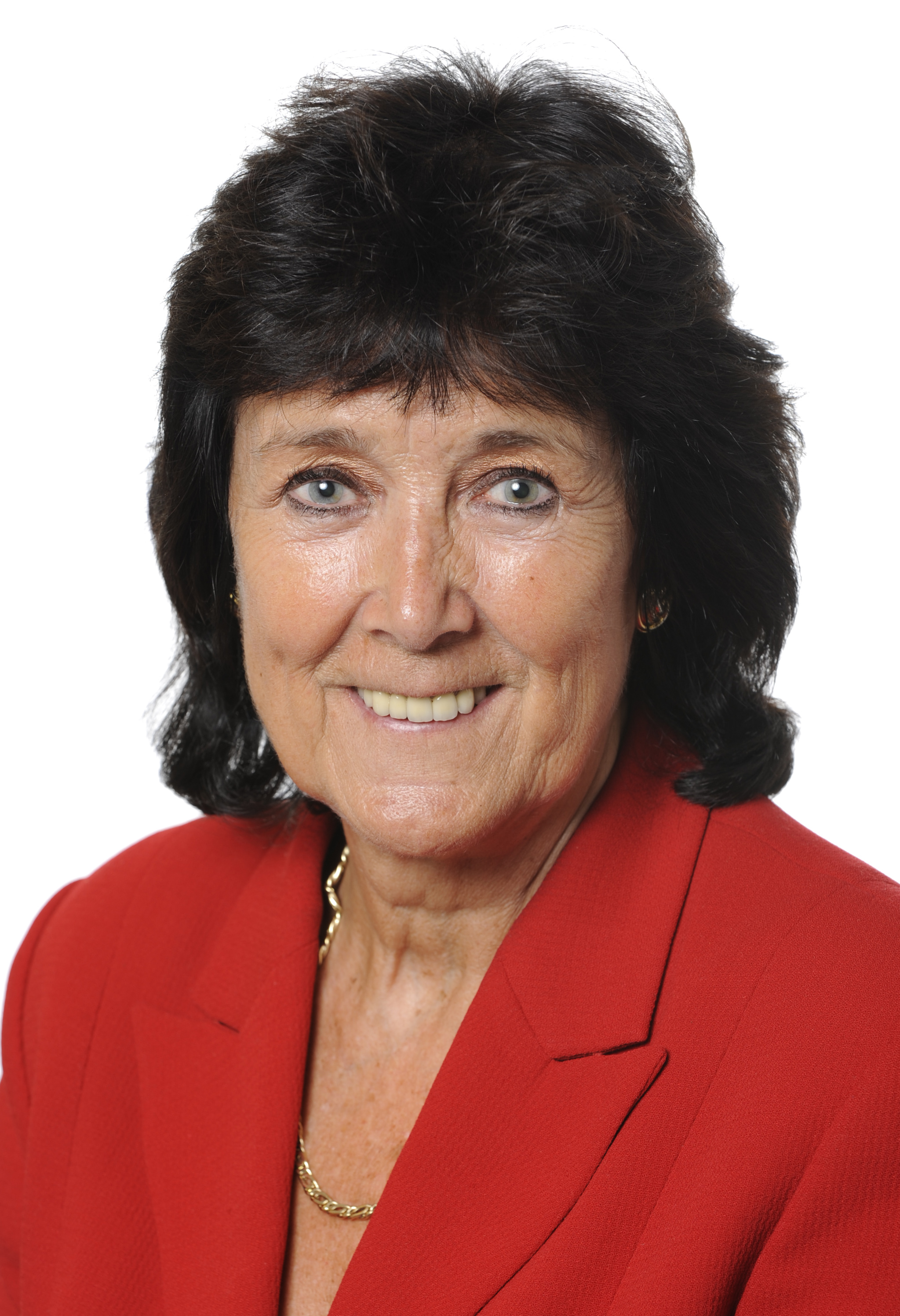

Member of the European Parliament for West Midlands
- In office 10 June 1999 – 3 February 2012
- Preceded by: Position established
- Succeeded by: Phil Bennion

Member of Parliament for Rochdale
- In office 9 April 1992 – 8 April 1997
- Preceded by: Sir Cyril Smith
- Succeeded by: Lorna Fitzsimons

Personal details
- Born: Elizabeth Lynne; 22 January 1948 (age 78) Woking
- Party: Liberal Democrat

Elizabeth Lynne (born 22 January 1948) is a British Liberal Democrat politician. She was member of parliament (MP) for Rochdale from the 1992 general election until her defeat in the 1997 general election, and a Member of the European Parliament (MEP) for the West Midlands for the 1999 European election until her retirement in 2012.

== Biography ==
Lynne was born in Woking and educated at Dorking County Grammar School. Between 1966 and 1989 she was an actress, appearing in The Mousetrap. She also worked as a speech consultant between 1988 and 1992. In 1987 general election she contested Harwich where she was defeated. Lynne is the founder and former chair of the Indonesian Co-ordination for the British Section of Amnesty International. Whilst an MP she was the Liberal Democrats' spokesperson on Health and Community Care, and then spokesperson on Social Security and Disability. She is also one the patrons for the domestic violence charity ManKind Initiative.

She was rated as the 35th best out of all 785 MEPs and 9th best of the 78 UK MEPs on promoting transparency and reform according to the Open Europe think tank. She was a founding member—and Vice President—of the European Parliament Intergroup MEPs Against Cancer.

== Political career ==
Lynne has been an MP and an MEP. She sat as an MEP for the West Midlands from 1999 to 2012. On 5 November 2011 she announced that she would be stepping down from the position, and she did so on 3 February 2012. Her seat was filled by Phil Bennion, who was second on the Liberal Democrat party list.

Parliament of the United Kingdom
Preceded by Sir Cyril Smith	Member of Parliament for Rochdale; 1992–1997	Succeeded by Lorna Fitzsimons
