= Cobden Club =

Coordinates: 51°31′32.14″N 0°12′23.53″W

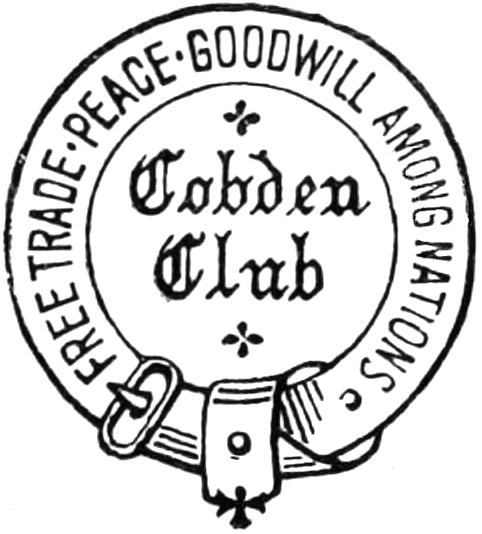
Free trade · Peace · Goodwill amongst nations—publishing logo as used by the Cobden Club in 1881 works

The Cobden Club was a society and publishing imprint, based in London, run along the lines of a gentlemen's club of the Victorian era, but without permanent club premises of its own. Founded in 1866 by Thomas Bayley Potter for believers in Free Trade doctrine, it was named in honour of Richard Cobden, who had died the year before. Potter was honorary secretary of the Cobden Club from its foundation until his death in 1898.

Unusually for contemporary clubs, it had a publishing arm. The publishing arm was instrumental in publishing Cobden's collected speeches in 1870, under the co-editorship of John Bright, one of the club's early patrons. Because of its Free Trade connection, it mainly attracted Liberals as members, but with the fading of both the Liberals as a national force, and of Free Trade as a popular cause, the club fell into decline in the 20th century. The popularity of Temperance reform among members also made it unappealing to potential recruits with the passing years.

In 1958 the Cobden Club, by now moribund, was taken over by the classical liberal activist Oliver Smedley. Like many other clubs, it went through substantial financial difficulties in the late 1970s, and closed at the end of that decade.

It is unrelated to the Cobden Working Men's Club founded in Kensal Town, London in 1880 (other than their both having been named after the same person). Nor is it related to a later west London private restaurant and bar of that name founded in 1996, which claimed to be a "refounded" Cobden Club, but which had no connection to the old club, and had no political affiliation, and later closed.

== See also ==
- List of London's gentlemen's clubs
