= Sir Alexander Ramsay, 3rd Baronet =

British Conservative politician

Sir Alexander Ramsay Bt
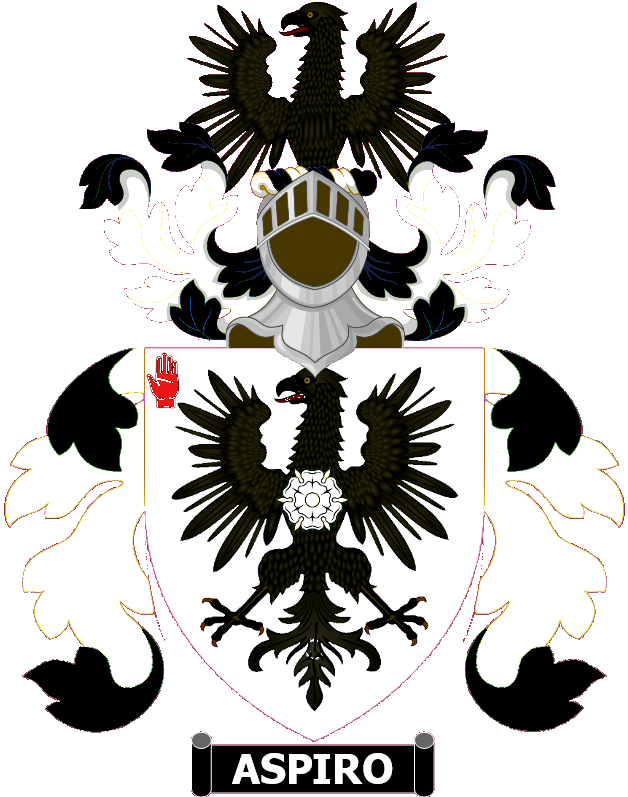

Member of Parliament for Rochdale
- In office 30 March 1857 – 29 April 1859
- Preceded by: Edward Miall
- Succeeded by: Richard Cobden

Personal details
- Born: 26 May 1813
- Died: 3 March 1875 (aged 61)
- Party: Conservative
- Spouse: Ellen Matilda (m. 1835)
- Children: Five, including Sir Alexander Entwisle Ramsay, 4th Baronet
- Parent(s): Sir Alexander Ramsay, 2nd Baronet; Jane Russell

Sir Alexander Ramsay, 3rd Baronet (26 May 1813 - 3 March 1875) was a Conservative Party politician.

== Family ==
Baptised at Fettercairn, Kincardineshire in 1813, Ramsay was the son of his namesake Sir Alexander Ramsay, 2nd Baronet and Jane née Russell. He married Ellen Matilda Entwisle, daughter of John Smith Entwisle, in 1835 and they had five children: Ellen Augusta, Alexander Entwisle (1837–1902); Hugh Francis (1838–1890); John (1843–1913); and Bertin (1850–1907).

== Parliamentary career ==
After contesting the seat unsuccessfully in both 1837 and 1852, Ramsay was elected Conservative MP for Rochdale at the 1857 general election, gaining the seat from the Radical Edward Miall. However, he did not attempt to retain the seat at the next election in 1859.

== Baronetage ==
Ramsay became the 3rd Baronet of Balmain upon his father's death in 1852. Upon his own death in 1875, the title was passed to his son Alexander Entwisle.

Coat of arms of Sir Alexander Ramsay, 3rd Baronet

Crest
A demi-eagle displayed Sable.
Escutcheon
Argent an eagle displayed Sable and charged on the breast with a rose of the field.
Motto
Aspiro

Parliament of the United Kingdom
Preceded by Edward Miall	Member of Parliament for Rochdale; 1857 – 1859	Succeeded by Richard Cobden
Baronetage of the United Kingdom
Preceded by Alexander Ramsay	Baronet (of Balmain); 1852 – 1875	Succeeded by Alexander Entwisle Ramsay
