= Joseph Hale (MP) =

British politician (1913–1985)

Joseph Hale (28 October 1913 – 7 February 1985) was a British engineer and politician.

Born in Waterloo, Lancashire, Hale became an engineer, serving with the Merchant Navy until 1939, when he joined a company making plastics. He also joined the Labour Party, serving on Bolton Borough Council from 1946 until 1950, and was also active in the Amalgamated Engineering Union.

Hale was elected as the Member of Parliament (MP) for Rochdale in 1950, but was defeated in 1951.

Parliament of the United Kingdom
Preceded by Hyacinth Morgan	Member of Parliament for Rochdale; 1950 – 1951	Succeeded by Wentworth Schofield
