= Alfred Law =

British politician

Sir Alfred Law
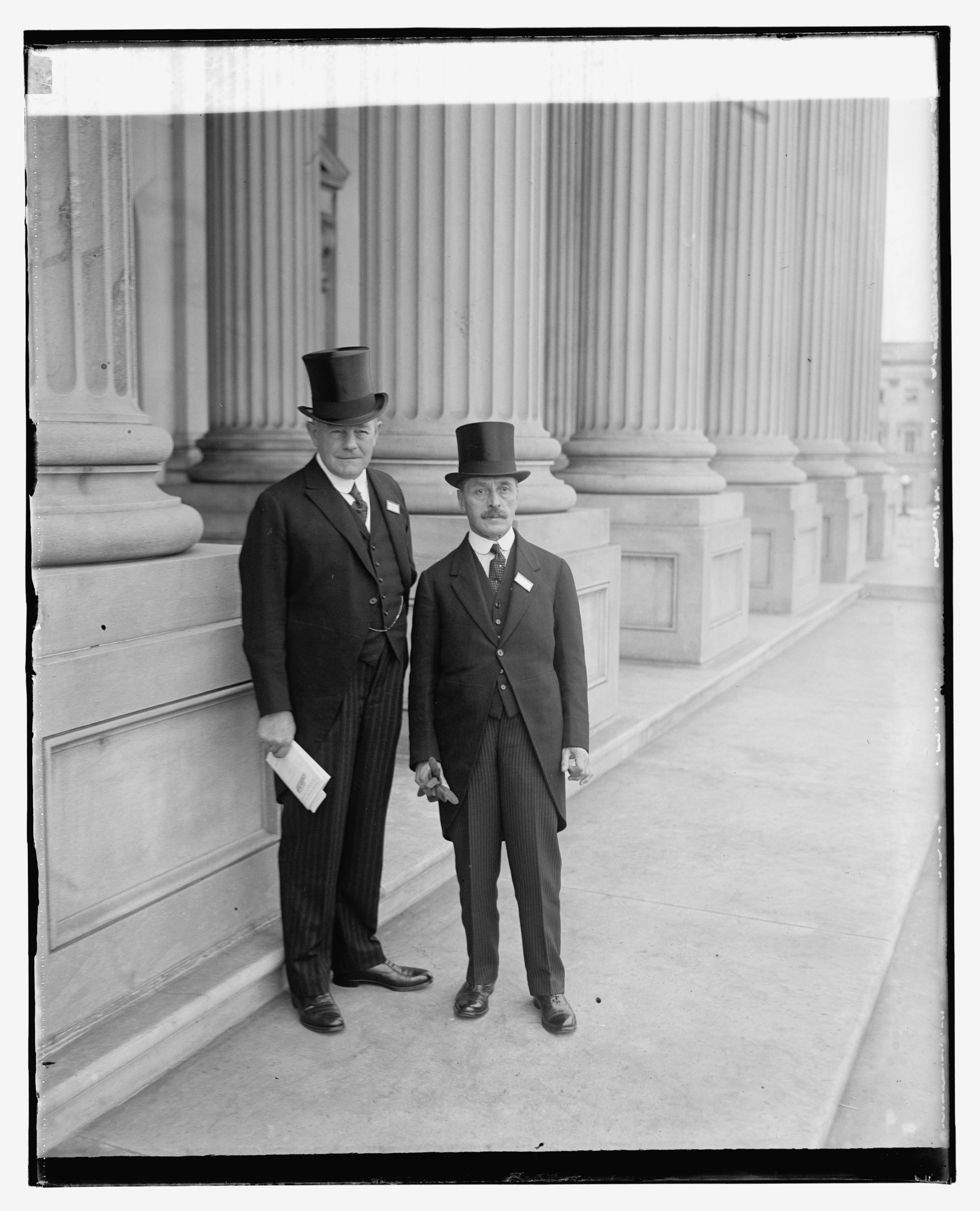
- Law (right) with George Harvey in 1925.

Member of Parliament for High Peak
- In office 30 May 1929 – 18 January 1939
- Preceded by: Samuel Hill-Wood
- Succeeded by: Hugh Molson

Member of Parliament for Rochdale
- In office 14 December 1918 – 15 November 1922
- Preceded by: Gordon Harvey
- Succeeded by: Stanley Burgess

Personal details
- Born: 31 May 1860 West Bromwich, Staffordshire, England
- Died: 18 July 1939 (aged 79) Littleborough, Lancashire, England
- Party: Conservative

Sir Alfred Joseph Law (31 May 1860 – 18 July 1939) was a Conservative Party politician in the United Kingdom.

Born in West Bromwich, he was elected at the 1918 general election as member of parliament (MP) for the Rochdale constituency in Lancashire, but was defeated at the 1922 general election.

He was returned to the House of Commons at the 1929 general election for the High Peak constituency in Derbyshire, and held the seat until his death in Littleborough 1939, aged 79.

In 1921 Law donated the trophy for a rugby league match between Oldham and Rochdale. It was originally known as the Infirmaries Cup and later renamed as the Law Cup.

Sir Alfred was the owner of the poet Robert Burns's First Commonplace Book 1783–1785 manuscript volume that he had inherited from William Law of Honresfield, Lancashire, his uncle. The poet's second commonplace book, the Edinburgh Journal is held by the Robert Burns Birthplace Museum in Alloway, South Ayrshire.

Parliament of the United Kingdom
Preceded by Gordon Harvey	Member of Parliament for Rochdale; 1918–1922	Succeeded by Stanley Burgess
Preceded by Samuel Hill-Wood	Member of Parliament for High Peak; 1929–1939	Succeeded by Hugh Molson
