= Ramsay Muir =

British politician

- Portrait of Muir
- Born: John Ramsay Bryce Muir; 30 September 1872; Otterburn, Northumberland, England
- Died: 4 May 1941 (aged 68); Pinner, Middlesex, England
- Education: University College, Liverpool; Balliol College, Oxford
- Occupation: politician

John Ramsay Bryce Muir (30 September 1872 – 4 May 1941) was a British historian, Liberal Party politician and thinker who made a significant contribution to the development of liberal political philosophy in the 1920s and 1930s through his work on domestic industrial policy and his promotion of the international policy of interdependency.

== Early life and education ==
Muir was born at Otterburn, Northumberland, the oldest of five children of a Reformed Presbyterian minister. He was educated privately in Birkenhead, then at University College, Liverpool, where he gained a first in history and then at Balliol College, Oxford, where he gained firsts in Greats and modern history.

== Academic career ==
In 1898, Muir became an assistant lecturer in history at the University of Manchester and the following year he was appointed lecturer in history at Liverpool. From 1906 until 1913, he was professor of history at Liverpool when he resigned to take up a visiting lectureship at the University of Punjab in India (1913–14). On return to England he became professor of modern history at the University of Manchester. Between 1917 and 1919 he was a member of a commission investigating Calcutta University and Indian post-secondary education. He ended his academic career in 1921 and embarked full-time on political work.

== Liberalism and politics ==
While at Manchester, Muir had become active in the Manchester Liberal Federation and this sparked his interest in industrial, economic and social reform. He published the book Liberalism and Industry in 1920 and in 1921 he was one of the founders of the Liberal Summer Schools, an annual, week-long, residential school to promote interest in the party and to develop innovative policies. The schools were held in alternate years at Cambridge and Oxford until 1939. The schools produced the Liberal ‘coloured books’ on industrial and social questions, most famously Britain's Industrial Future (the "Yellow Book"), and were a source of ideas for progressives in politics. Muir was also a prominent Liberal writer contributing frequently to The Nation and the Weekly Westminster. During the 1930s, he edited the Westminster Newsletter, a weekly commentary on Liberal Party affairs.

Muir stood for Parliament eight times in all in the Liberal interest between 1922 and 1935. He was elected at the 1923 general election as Member of Parliament (MP) for Rochdale in Lancashire, having been unsuccessful in that constituency at the 1922 general election However he was defeated at the 1924 election. He stood for Parliament again at five further elections, without success:

- 1926: by-election for the Combined English Universities
- 1929 general election: Rochdale
- 1931: by-election in Scarborough & Whitby
- 1931 general election: Louth
- 1935 general election: Scarborough and Whitby

Muir was also a leading figure in the National Liberal Federation (NLF), being its chairman from 1931 to 1933 and president from 1933 to 1933. He was a driving spirit behind the party reorganisation of 1936, and briefly (in 1936) acted as vice-president of the new Liberal Party Organization (LPO). From 1936 until his death he chaired the education and propaganda committee of the LPO. He was a key contributor to the Liberal policy review of 1934 and principal author of its report ‘The Liberal Way’. Although Muir was associated closely with the progressive ideas coming out of the Liberal Summer Schools, the radical solutions for unemployment, industrial and social reform which were inspired by Maynard Keynes, Lloyd George and William Beveridge, he was also something of a classical Liberal too. He was particularly constant over Free Trade, which he always supported, and took a paternal view of Imperial and Colonial questions, in which Britain's duties to its colonies took centre stage with an emphasis on trusteeship.

During the Second World War, Muir was a volunteer writer and lecturer for the Ministry of Information. He never married or had children and died at his home in Pinner, Middlesex, on 4 May 1941 aged 68.

== Bibliography ==
- History of Municipal Government in Liverpool (joint with others), 1906
- History of Liverpool, 1907
- Peers and Bureaucrats, 1910
- Atlas of Modern History, 1911
- Philips' new historical atlas for students (joint with others), 1911
- Britain's Case Against Germany, 1915
- Making of British India, 1915
- Nationalism and Internationalism, 1916
- The Expansion of Europe, 1917
- The Character of the British Empire, 1917
- National Self-Government, 1918
- Liberalism and Industry: Towards a Better Social Order, 1920
- History of the British Commonwealth, Volume I, 1920
- History of the British Commonwealth, Volume II, 1922
- Politics and Progress: A Survey of the Problems of Today, 1923
- America the Golden, 1927
- British History, 1928
- Robinson the Great, 1929
- How Britain is Governed, 1930
- Protection versus Free Imports, 1930
- The Political Consequences of the Great War, 1931
- The Interdependent World and its Problems, 1932
- The Faith of a Liberal, 1933
- A Brief History of Our Own Times, 1934
- The Record of the National Government, 1936
- Future for Democracy, 1939
- Civilisation and Liberty. London: Jonathan Cape. 1940 – via Internet Archive.
- Ramsay Muir: An Autobiography and Some Essays (edited by Stuart Hodgson), 1943

== See also ==
- List of Liberal Party (UK) MPs

== Bibliography ==
- F. W. S. Craig: British parliamentary election results 1918-1949, Parliamentary Research Services, Chichester, 1969 (ISBN 0-900178-06-X)
- Cregier, D. M. "Muir, (John) Ramsay Bryce". Oxford Dictionary of National Biography (online ed.). Oxford University Press. doi:10.1093/ref:odnb/35142. (Subscription, Wikipedia Library access or UK public library membership required.)
- Richard Grayson: Entries on Muir in Dictionary of Liberal Thought, Brack & Randall (eds.), Politico's, 2007 and Dictionary of Liberal Biography, Brack et al. (eds.), Politico's, 1998
- Ramsay Muir: An autobiography and some essays, ed. S. Hodgson, Lund Humphries,1943
- Anne Moore: Entry on Liberal Summer Schools in Dictionary of Liberal Thought, Brack & Randall (eds.), Politico's, 2007
- D. M. Cregier: Chiefs without Indians, University Press of America, 1982
- T. Wilson: The downfall of the liberal party, 1914–1935, Cornell UP,1966
- Richard Grayson: Liberals, International Relations and Appeasement, Frank Cass, 2001

Parliament of the United Kingdom
Preceded by Stanley Burgess	Member of Parliament for Rochdale; 1923–1924	Succeeded by William Thomas Kelly
Party political offices
Preceded by Arthur Brampton	Chairman of the National Liberal Federation; 1931–1933	Succeeded by Ronald Walker
Preceded by Arthur Brampton	President of the National Liberal Federation; 1933–1936	Succeeded by James Meston as President of the Liberal Party Organisation
