= Hyacinth Morgan =

British politician (1885–1956)

The Right Honourable Hyacinth Morgan

Member of Parliament for Camberwell North West
- In office 30 May 1929 – 7 October 1931
- Preceded by: Edward Taswell Campbell
- Succeeded by: James Dales Cassels

Member of Parliament for Rochdale
- In office 20 July 1940 – 3 February 1950
- Preceded by: William Kelly
- Succeeded by: Joseph Hale

Member of Parliament for Warrington
- In office 23 February 1950 – 6 May 1955
- Preceded by: Edward Porter
- Succeeded by: Edith Summerskill

Personal details
- Born: Hyacinth Bernard Wenceslaus Morgan; 11 September 1885 St. George's, Grenada
- Died: 7 May 1956 (aged 70)
- Party: Labour
- Education: University of Glasgow

Military service
- Allegiance: United Kingdom
- Branch/service: British Army
- Years of service: 1914–1918
- Rank: Captain
- Unit: Royal Army Medical Corps
- Battles/wars: First World War

Hyacinth Bernard Wenceslaus Morgan (11 September 1885 – 7 May 1956) was a Labour Party politician in the United Kingdom. He was a Member of Parliament (MP) from 1929 to 1931, and 1940 to 1955.

He was born, of Irish descent, in Grenada, West Indies and came to the United Kingdom to study medicine at Glasgow University in 1904. While at University he was active in the Fabian Society and founded the students' Irish Nationalist Club. After qualifying, he worked in a number of Glasgow mental hospitals and then served as a doctor in the Royal Army Medical Corps during the First World War in both France and England. He then entered general practice in London, initially at Greenwich, later Camberwell and finally at Paddington.

== Political career ==
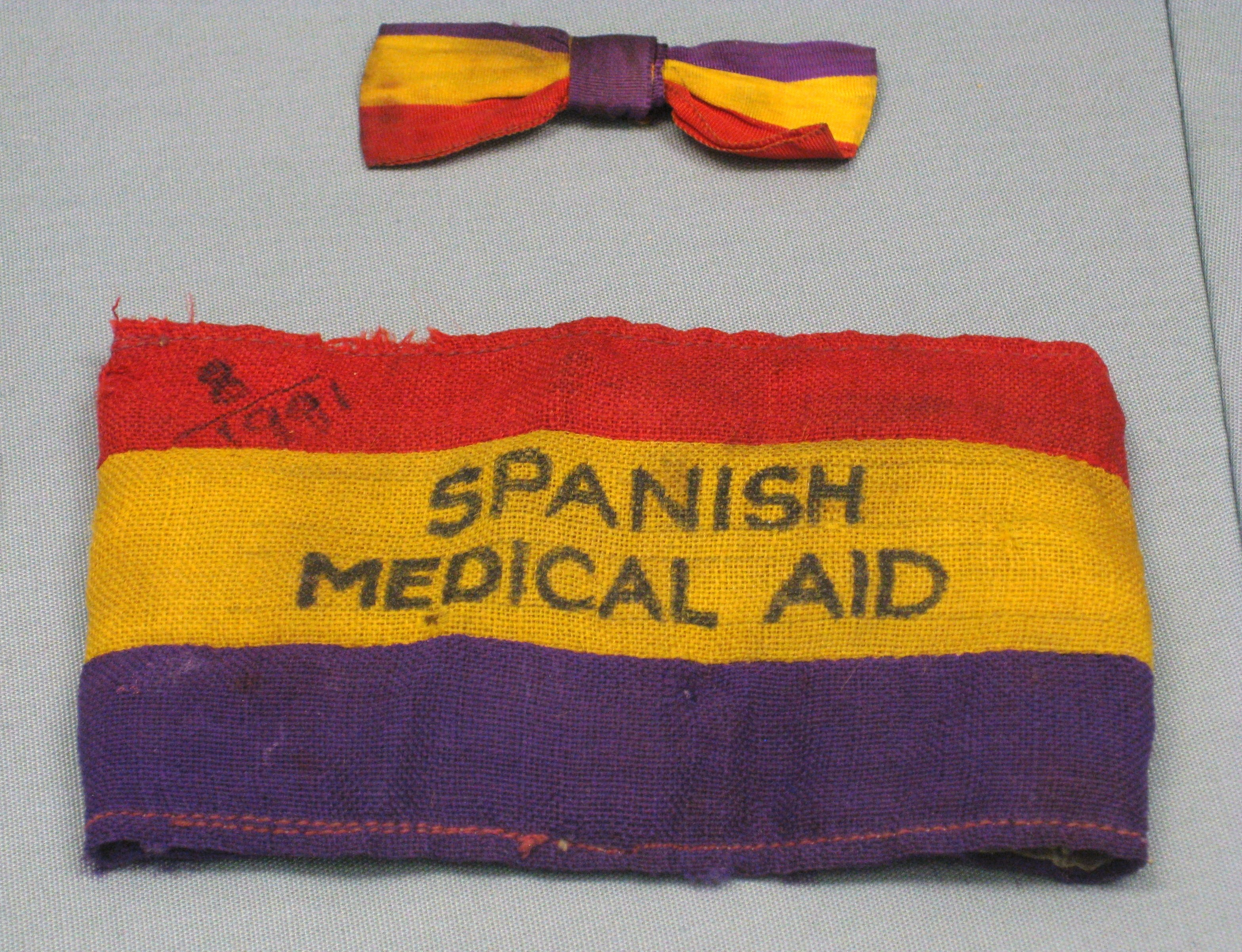
Spanish Medical Aid armband

Morgan contested the South London constituency of Camberwell North West at the 1922 general election, but lost by a wide margin to the National Liberal MP Thomas James Macnamara. He stood again at the 1923 election, when Macnamara had re-joined the Liberal Party, and lost by only 80 votes. In 1924, Sir Edward Taswell Campbel won the seat by only 194 votes. Morgan finally won the seat at the 1929 general election.

However, the Labour Party split at the 1931 general election over fiscal policy; Prime Minister Ramsay MacDonald had left the party to form a National Government with the support of the Conservative Party and some Liberals, and Labour's national share of the vote fell from 37% to 31%. In most seats, Liberal and Conservative candidates agreed a single candidate would stand against Labour. As a result Labour retained only 52 of the 287 constituencies it had won in 1929, and Morgan's Camberwell seat was one of the seats lost.

He did not stand for Parliament again until 1940, when the Labour MP William Kelly resigned his Rochdale seat. At the by-election in July 1940, Morgan was elected unopposed. He was then re-elected in 1945 with only a 10% majority. At the 1950 general election he moved to the safer Warrington seat, which he won with a comfortable 19% majority. He won re-election in 1951 and retired from Parliament at the 1955 general election.

In the periods he was not serving as a Member Parliament, Morgan returned to the practice of medicine. In 1936 he worked with Charles Brook and other members of the Labour-affiliated Socialist Medical Association to found the Spanish Medical Aid Committee to provide supplies and a uniformed medical unit to the Republican side in the Spanish Civil War. He served as a member of the Confederation of Health Service Employees (COHSE) union National Executive Committee and COHSE's Medical Guild from 1946 to 1951. Morgan died in 1956, aged 70.

== Sources ==
- Craig, F.W.S. (1983) [1969]. British parliamentary election results 1918-1949 (3rd ed.). Chichester, UK: Parliamentary Research Services. ISBN 0-900178-06-X.
- Leigh Rayment's Historical List of MPs

Parliament of the United Kingdom
Preceded by Edward Campbell	Member of Parliament for Camberwell North West; 1929–1931	Succeeded by James Cassels
Preceded by William Kelly	Member of Parliament for Rochdale; 1940–1950	Succeeded by Joseph Hale
Preceded by Edward Porter	Member of Parliament for Warrington; 1950–1955	Succeeded by Edith Summerskill
