= Thomas Jesson =

Thomas Edward Jesson (28 July 1882 – 23 July 1958) was Conservative MP for Rochdale from 1931 to 1935.
