= Wentworth Schofield =

British politician

Lt Col Wentworth Schofield (17 April 1891 – 16 December 1957) was a British politician who served as the last Conservative Member of Parliament (MP) for Rochdale from 25 October 1951 to 16 December 1957.

Schofield was from Oldham, Lancashire, and was active in the cotton-spinning industry. He formed the Manchester Yarn Spinners' Association and was a committee member of the Oldham Master Cotton Spinners' Association and the Federation of Master Cotton Spinners' Association, as well as acting as secretary to a cotton trade association. He also served as senior vice-president of Oldham Chamber of Commerce and on the British national committee of the International Chamber of Commerce and the British Empires Chambers of Commerce. Also interested in foreign affairs, Schofield was an authority on the Congo Basin Treaties and served with the Territorial Army for 33 years, commanding a battalion of the Royal Tank Regiment in World War II, gaining the rank of lieutenant-colonel.

Schofield contested the Rochdale seat without success at the 1950 general election but was first elected to Parliament in the 1951 general election, defeating the Labour incumbent. He retained the seat until his death in 1957 aged 66.

In the consequent 1958 Rochdale by-election, he was succeeded as MP by the Labour candidate Jack McCann, who fought off a strong challenge from the Liberal Ludovic Kennedy.

== See also ==
- 1958 Rochdale by-election

Parliament of the United Kingdom
Preceded by Joseph Hale	Member of Parliament for Rochdale; 1951–1957	Succeeded by Jack McCann
