= Jack McCann =

British politician (1910–1972)

John McCann (4 December 1910 – 16 July 1972) was a British politician, who served as the Labour Member of Parliament for Rochdale.

McCann was educated at elementary school and then at classes of the National Council of Labour Colleges and Workers' Educational Association. He became an engineer and diesel engine fitter and served with the Home Guard during World War II. He was elected a councillor on Eccles Borough Council in 1945 and was leader of the Labour Group. He was an Alderman in Eccles from 1952 and Mayor 1955–56. He served as chairman of the West Manchester Hospital Management Committee.

McCann first contested the Rochdale seat for Parliament in 1955 without success. He was first elected in a 1958 by-election following the death of the sitting Conservative MP Wentworth Schofield. He became an opposition whip in 1961 and in 1964 was appointed to the Government's Whips' Office as Lord Commissioner of the Treasury, then in 1966 as Vice-Chamberlain of the Household, returning to be a Lord of the Treasury 1967–69.

McCann died at Davyhulme Hospital on 16 July 1972, aged 61, after about a year of ill health. In the consequent by-election in October, he was succeeded as MP by the Liberal candidate Cyril Smith, who had previously been a Labour mayor of the town.

Parliament of the United Kingdom
| Preceded by Wentworth Schofield | Member of Parliament for Rochdale; 1958–1972 | Succeeded by Cyril Smith |
Political offices
| Preceded by William Whitlock | Vice-Chamberlain of the Household (Government whip); 1966–1967 | Succeeded by Charles Morris |
