= Ludovic Kennedy =

Scottish journalist and broadcaster (1919–2009)

Sir Ludovic Kennedy FRSL
- Kennedy in 1958
- Born: Ludovic Henry Coverley Kennedy; 3 November 1919; Edinburgh, Scotland
- Died: 18 October 2009 (aged 89); Salisbury, Wiltshire, England
- Education: Christ Church, Oxford
- Occupations: Journalist; broadcaster; political activist; author
- Political party: Liberal (before 1988); Liberal Democrats (1988–2001; after 2001)
- Other political affiliations: Independent (2001)
- Spouse: Moira Shearer (m. 1950; died 2006)
- Children: 4

Sir Ludovic Henry Coverley Kennedy, FRSL (3 November 1919 – 18 October 2009) was a Scottish journalist, broadcaster, humanist and author. As well as his wartime service in the Royal Navy, he is known for presenting many current affairs programmes and for reexamining cases such as the Lindbergh kidnapping and the murder convictions of Timothy Evans and Derek Bentley. He also campaigned for the abolition of the death penalty in the United Kingdom.

== Early life ==
Kennedy was born in 1919 in Edinburgh, the son of a career Royal Navy officer, Edward Kennedy, and his wife, Rosalind Grant, daughter of Sir Ludovic Grant, 11th Baronet. Rosalind was a cousin of the Conservative politician Robert Boothby, later Lord Boothby. He had two younger sisters, Morar and Katherine. Morar married the playwright Royce Ryton in 1954. Katherine married Major Ion Calvocoressi in 1947. Kennedy was schooled at Eton College (where he played in a jazz band with Humphrey Lyttelton) and studied for a year at Christ Church, Oxford, until the outbreak of war. While at Oxford he was a member of the Bullingdon Club.

Kennedy's father, by then a retired captain, returned to the navy and was given command of HMS Rawalpindi, a hastily militarised P&O ocean liner, known as an armed merchant cruiser, that was used on the Northern Patrol. On 23 November 1939, while on patrol southeast of Iceland, Rawalpindi encountered two of the most powerful German warships, the small battleships (or battlecruisers) Scharnhorst and Gneisenau, trying to break out between Iceland and Britain into the Atlantic. Rawalpindi was able to signal the German ships' location back to base. Despite being hopelessly outgunned, Kennedy decided to fight rather than surrender as demanded by the Germans. Scharnhorst sank Rawalpindi; of her 312 crew, 275 (including her captain) were killed. Kennedy was posthumously mentioned in dispatches and his decision to fight against overwhelming odds entered the folklore of the Royal Navy.

=== Naval officer ===
Ludovic Kennedy followed his father into the Royal Navy; he served as an officer on destroyers, mostly in the same northern seas. His ship, HMS Tartar, was one of those that pursued the battleship Bismarck following the Battle of the Denmark Strait. He witnessed the final battle, until Bismarck was ablaze and its crew began to abandon ship, but shortage of fuel forced Tartar to depart for home before Bismarck sank. Kennedy later wrote about this in his 1974 book Pursuit, his chronicle of the chase and sinking of Bismarck.

=== Return to university ===
Kennedy returned to Christ Church, Oxford, at the end of the war to complete his English degree. He also edited the student newspaper The Isis Magazine. At Oxford he cofounded the Writers' Club and wrote a book on Nelson's captains. After leaving Oxford he began a career as an investigative journalist.

== Journalism and broadcasting ==
Kennedy wrote for a number of publications, including Newsweek. From 1953, he edited and introduced the First Reading radio series on the BBC Third Programme, presenting young writers such as Kingsley Amis and Philip Larkin. Later he became a television journalist and a newsreader on ITV's Independent Television News alongside Robin Day and Chris Chataway. He presented the BBC's flagship current affairs programme Panorama for several years. Kennedy was interested in miscarriages of justice and wrote and broadcast on numerous cases. In 1957 Kennedy made a guest appearance as a newsreader in the Scotland Yard supporting feature series episode The Lonely House.

Kennedy was interested in naval warfare. He wrote and presented a substantial number of television documentaries for the BBC on maritime history in the Second World War, beginning with Scapa Flow, followed by the dramatic narrative of the sinking of the Bismarck in which he was involved. Other subjects included the U-boat war, the story of HMS Belfast, and the Dieppe Raid and St Nazaire Raid. The Life and Death of the Scharnhorst (1971) brought him into contact with survivors of the battlecruiser that had sunk his father's ship Rawalpindi. The series included Target Tirpitz (1973), a history of the extraordinary attempts to sink the feared German battleship Tirpitz; two of the films led to books.

In 1980 he presented an episode of the BBC television series Great Railway Journeys of the World, in which he crossed the United States.

From 1980 to 1988 he presented the television review programme Did You See...? He interviewed Peter Cook's character Sir Arthur Streeb-Greebling in A Life in Pieces in 1990. He appeared as himself in several episodes on the political comedy series Yes Minister, often being called Ludo by Jim Hacker and Humphrey Appleby. Kennedy was the subject of an episode of That Reminds Me (2002: series 4, episode 1). Kennedy also expressed to another journalist that there were "too many Blacks" on television.

Private Eye magazine sometimes referred to him as Ludicrous Kennedy. In the long-running BBC sitcom Till Death Us Do Part, Alf Garnett, while attacking BBC personalities, described Kennedy as a Russian Mick ("Mick" being a derogatory term for an Irish person), meaning "that Ludovich Kennedy!"

== Writing ==
Kennedy's book Pursuit: The Chase and Sinking of the "Bismarck" (ISBN 978-0-304-35526-6) detailed the career of the Bismarck, her sinking of British battlecruiser Hood, and her destruction by the Royal Navy.

=== Miscarriages of justice ===
He wrote several books that questioned convictions in a number of notable cases in British judicial history. One of the first miscarriages of justice he investigated was the conviction and hanging of Timothy Evans in his 1961 book Ten Rillington Place (ISBN 978-0-586-03428-6). Evans was convicted of murdering his baby daughter in 1950, but Kennedy contended that he was innocent and that the murders of his wife and baby had been committed by serial killer John Christie, who had been Evans' landlord. Christie was hanged three years after the hanging of Evans, following the discovery of six more bodies at 10 Rillington Place, none of which could be ascribed to Evans. Indeed, two of the skeletons found at the house dated back to the war – long before Evans and his family had moved in. After a long campaign Evans was posthumously pardoned in 1966. The scandal helped in the abolition of the death penalty in the UK. In 1970 Kennedy's book was turned into a film entitled 10 Rillington Place; the British crime film starred Richard Attenborough as Christie, John Hurt as Timothy Evans, Judy Geeson as Beryl Evans, and Pat Heywood as Ethel Christie.

In 1985 Kennedy published The Airman and the Carpenter (ISBN 978-0-670-80606-5), in which he argued that Richard Hauptmann did not kidnap and murder Charles Lindbergh's baby, a crime for which he was executed in 1936. The book was made into a 1996 HBO film Crime of the Century, starring Stephen Rea and Isabella Rossellini. In 1990 Kennedy became the advisory committee chairman of Just Television, a television production company dedicated to exposing miscarriages of justice. In 2003 he wrote 36 Murders and 2 Immoral Earnings (ISBN 978-1-86197-457-0), in which he analysed a number of noted cases, including the Evans case and those of Derek Bentley and the Birmingham Six, a number of which were affected by claims of police failure, police misconduct or perjury. In it he concluded that the adversarial system of justice in the UK and the United States "is an invitation to the police to commit perjury, which they frequently do", and said that he preferred the inquisitorial system.

Kennedy also wrote,

- Sub-Lieutenant: A Personal Record of the War at Sea, 1942
- Nelson's Band of Brothers, 1951, (US edition Nelson's Captains, 1952)
  - revised as Nelson and His Captains, 1975, ISBN 0-00-211569-7, reprinted 2001 ISBN 978-0-14-139090-1
- One Man's Meat, 1953
- Murder Story, 1954
- Trial of Stephen Ward, 1964, ISBN 978-0-575-01035-2
- Very lovely people; a personal look at some Americans living abroad, 1969 ISBN 978-0-671-20205-7
- Presumption of Innocence: Amazing Case of Patrick Meehan, 1976 ISBN 978-0-575-02072-6
- Death of the Tirpitz (also called Menace – The Life and Death of the Tirpitz), 1979 ISBN 978-0-316-48905-8
- Wicked beyond belief: The Luton murder case, 1980, ISBN 978-0-586-05172-6
- On My Way to the Club, 1990 ISBN 0-00-637079-9 (his autobiography)
- Euthanasia: The Case for the Good Death, 1990 (ISBN 978-0-7011-3639-0)
- Truth to Tell: Collected Writings of Ludovic Kennedy, 1992 ISBN 978-0-552-99505-4
- In Bed with an Elephant: Personal View of Scotland, 1995 ISBN 978-0-593-02326-6
- All in the Mind: A Farewell To God, 1999 ISBN 978-0-340-68063-6 (a critique of Christianity)

== Politics and campaigns ==
In 1958, Kennedy stood for election to Parliament as the Liberal candidate in the Rochdale by-election called after the death of the sitting Conservative MP, Wentworth Schofield, in December 1957. He lost to the Labour candidate, Jack McCann, but achieved an increase in the Liberal vote, pushing the Conservatives into third place. The Rochdale contest was covered by Granada Television, the first British by-election to receive live television coverage. He stood for Rochdale at the 1959 general election, with a vote share increased from the by-election, but again came second to Labour.

In addition to his writing and campaigning on miscarriages of justice, Kennedy campaigned on a number of other issues. A lifelong atheist, he published All in the Mind: A Farewell to God in 1999, in which he discussed his philosophical objections to religion, and the ills he felt had come from Christianity. He was a Distinguished Supporter of the British Humanist Association, he contributed to New Humanist magazine, he was an Honorary Associate of the National Secular Society and a Distinguished Supporter of the Humanist Society Scotland.

He was also an advocate of the legalisation of assisted suicide, and was a co-founder and former chair of the Voluntary Euthanasia Society. His book, Euthanasia: The Case for the Good Death, was published in 1990. Kennedy resigned from the Liberal Democrats in 2001, citing the incompatibility of his pro-voluntary euthanasia views with those of the Liberal Democrat leader Charles Kennedy (not a close relation), who was a Roman Catholic. He then stood as an independent on a platform of legalising voluntary euthanasia in the 2001 general election for the Wiltshire constituency of Devizes. He won 2 per cent of the vote and subsequently rejoined the Liberal Democrats.

== Personal life ==
In February 1950 he married the dancer and actress Moira Shearer in the Chapel Royal, Hampton Court Palace. He later remembered their meeting in 1949, when he was reluctantly persuaded by a friend to accept a complimentary ticket to a fancy dress ball held at the Lyceum ballroom in London. Shearer, who had recently become famous for her role in The Red Shoes, was presenting the prizes at the occasion. Kennedy later recalled that "I felt a tremor run through me when I caught sight of her. She looked even lovelier than in the film". Summoning up his courage, he approached the 23-year-old dancer and asked her to dance. She would be delighted, she told him, only "I don't dance very well." She was not, Kennedy revealed, a competent ballroom dancer. The couple had one son and three daughters from their marriage that ended with her death on 31 January 2006 at the age of 80. Kennedy died of pneumonia in a nursing home in Salisbury, Wiltshire, on 18 October 2009, aged 89.

== Honours ==
He received an honorary doctorate from the University of Strathclyde in 1985. He was knighted in the 1994 Queen's Birthday Honours List for services to journalism, on the recommendation of John Major's government. Major's predecessor, Margaret Thatcher, had vetoed Kennedy's knighthood.
