= Muhammad Anwar (sociologist) =

Pakistani sociologist (1945–2020)

- Born: April 4, 1945; Sargodha, Pakistan
- Education: B.A. in social sciences, University of the Punjab; Master's in sociology, University of the Punjab; Master's in economics, University of Manchester; PhD, University of Bradford
- Occupation: Sociologist
- Employers: Government College Peshawar; Commission for Racial Equality; University of Warwick
- Known for: Study of race and ethnicity, Research on British Pakistanis
- Notable work: Between Two Cultures (1976); The Myth of Return (1979); Race and Politics (1986); British Pakistanis: Demographic, Social and Economic Position (1996); Between Cultures (1998)
- Title: Emeritus Professor
- Awards: OBE for services to education

Muhammad Anwar, OBE (4 April 1945 – 11 June 2020) was a British-Pakistani sociologist who specialised in the study of race and ethnicity.

Anwar was born in Sargodha. His father was a senior civil servant. Anwar studied for a degree in social sciences at the University of the Punjab in Lahore, graduating in 1965, before taking a master's degree in sociology at the same institution. He subsequently worked as a lecturer at Government College Peshawar before moving to the United Kingdom in 1970, where he studied for a second master's degree, in economics at the University of Manchester, and a PhD at the University of Bradford, from where he graduated in 1977. His PhD thesis was about Pakistanis in northern England, and following his graduation from Bradford he worked for Rochdale Community Relations Council. Anwar started working at the Commission for Racial Equality (CRE) in 1981. At the CRE, he was the organisation's head of research. He joined the University of Warwick in 1989, where he directed the university's Centre for Research in Ethnic Relations until 1994 and was also a research professor. He retired from Warwick in 2012, becoming emeritus professor.

Anwar's publications included the books Between Two Cultures (1976), The Myth of Return (1979), Race and Politics (1986), British Pakistanis: Demographic, Social and Economic Position (1996) and Between Cultures (1998). In 2007, he was awarded an OBE for services to education.

Anwar's research highlighted that democratic political participation was as a key factor when it came to improving race relations. In his 1976 book on Pakistanis in the UK, Between Two Cultures, he wrote that "racism and discrimination were rife, and participation in the political process was very low". Tahir Abbas writes that Anwar had a "subjective, but also deeply proactive, commitment to integration through political participation and engagement. He understood the importance of taking part in society to activate the rights and responsibilities individuals have as citizens but also to make a difference in race relations". According to Abbas, Anwar's most significant contribution to the sociology of ethnic relations came in The Myth of Return, which was based on his PhD research.
