= 1958 Rochdale by-election =

UK Parliamentary by-election

The 1958 Rochdale by-election held on 13 February was a by-election for the constituency of Rochdale, in Lancashire, England, in the House of Commons. It was called following the death on 16 December 1957 of the sitting Conservative Member of Parliament, Wentworth Schofield.

This was the first British by-election to be televised and Liberal candidate Ludovic Kennedy used his media experience to increase coverage of his campaign. Granada Television broadcast two debates between the candidates as well as the election count, and the BBC conducted many interviews with voters.

The by-election was won by the Labour candidate, Jack McCann, with 22,000 votes, but Kennedy polled 17,603, the highest Liberal vote since the 1920s. The Conservative candidate, John Parkinson, was squeezed into third place with fewer than 10,000 votes.

== Result ==
By-election 1958: Rochdale
Party	Candidate	Votes	%	±%
Labour	Jack McCann	22,133	44.66	−3.79
Liberal	Ludovic Kennedy	17,603	35.52	New
Conservative	John E. Parkinson	9,827	19.83	−31.72
Majority		4,530	9.14	N/A
Turnout		49,563		
Labour gain from Conservative		Swing	+14.0	

== Previous election ==
General election 1955: Rochdale
Party	Candidate	Votes	%	±%
Conservative	Wentworth Schofield	26,518	51.55	+1.14
Labour	Jack McCann	24,928	48.45	−1.14
Majority		1,590	3.10	+2.28
Turnout		51,446	82.80	−2.9
Conservative hold		Swing	+1.1	

== See also ==
- 1940 Rochdale by-election, an unopposed war-time election
- 1972 Rochdale by-election
- Rochdale
- List of United Kingdom by-elections
