= Clement Royds =

British soldier and politician

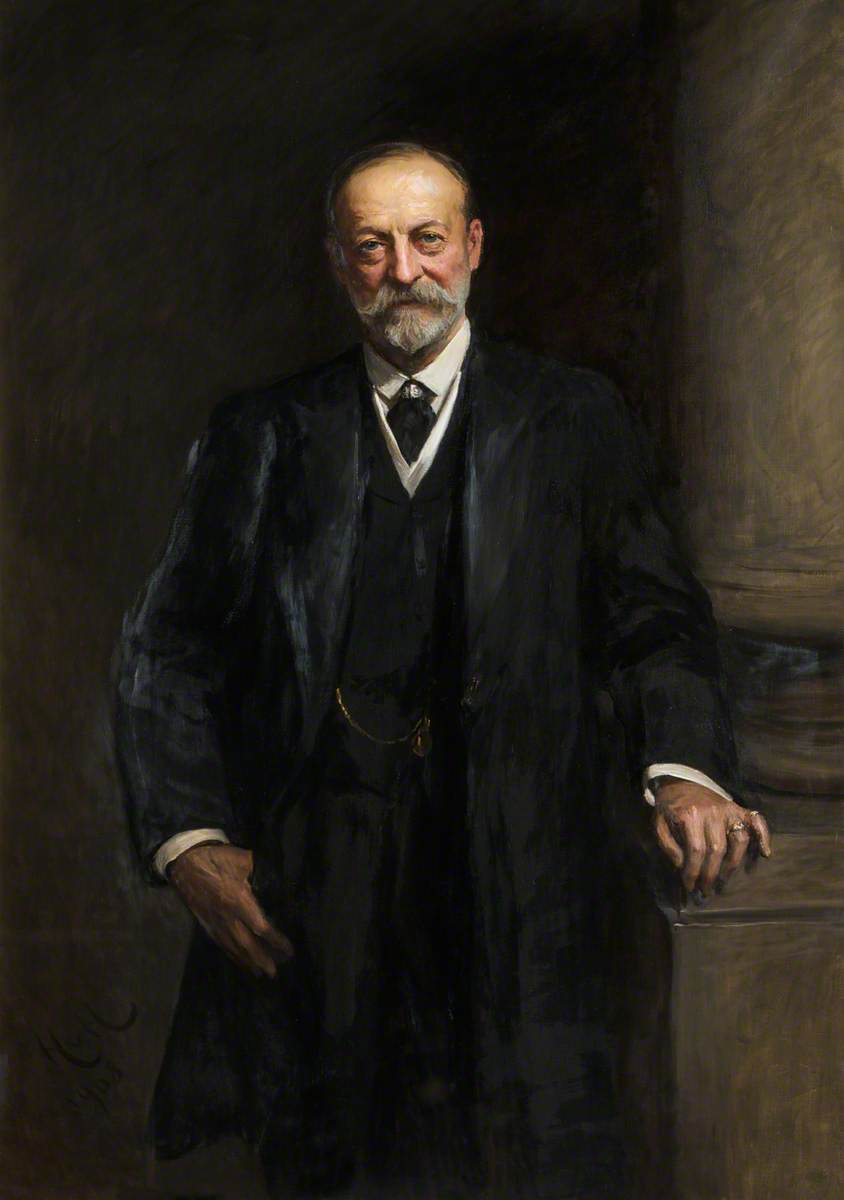
Image of Clement Royds

Colonel Sir Clement Molyneux Royds CB TD DL FSA (3 April 1842 – 28 January 1916) was a British soldier who was the Conservative Member of Parliament (MP) for Rochdale from 1895 to 1906.

He stood unsuccessfully in 1892, won the seat from the Liberals in 1895, held it in 1900, but lost it to them in the Liberal landslide of 1906. He was commanding officer of the Duke of Lancaster's Own Yeomanry and was then honorary colonel of the 2nd Battalion Lancashire Fusiliers. He was also Chairman of the Rochdale Canal Company.

== Philanthropy ==
At a meeting of the Royal National Lifeboat Institution (RNLI) committee of management on Thursday 6 January 1887, the receipt of £700 from Col. Royds was acknowledged, to be appropriated to the purchase of a new lifeboat for St Annes in Lancashire. The lifeboat was named Nora Royds (ON 194), and served at the station from 1887 until 1908.
