= Rochdale Observer =

British tabloid newspaper established in 1856

The Rochdale Observer
- Type: Bi-weekly newspaper
- Format: Tabloid
- Owner: Reach plc
- Founded: 1856
- ISSN: 0266-5220 (print); 0266-5220 (web)
- Website: rochdaleobserver.co.uk

The Rochdale Observer is a tabloid newspaper published on Wednesdays and Saturdays for the Metropolitan Borough of Rochdale, in Greater Manchester, England. It has been Rochdale's main newspaper since 1856. It has also been a discussion point in BBC hit school based drama Waterloo Road.
