= 2026 Rochdale Borough Council election =

2026 English local government election

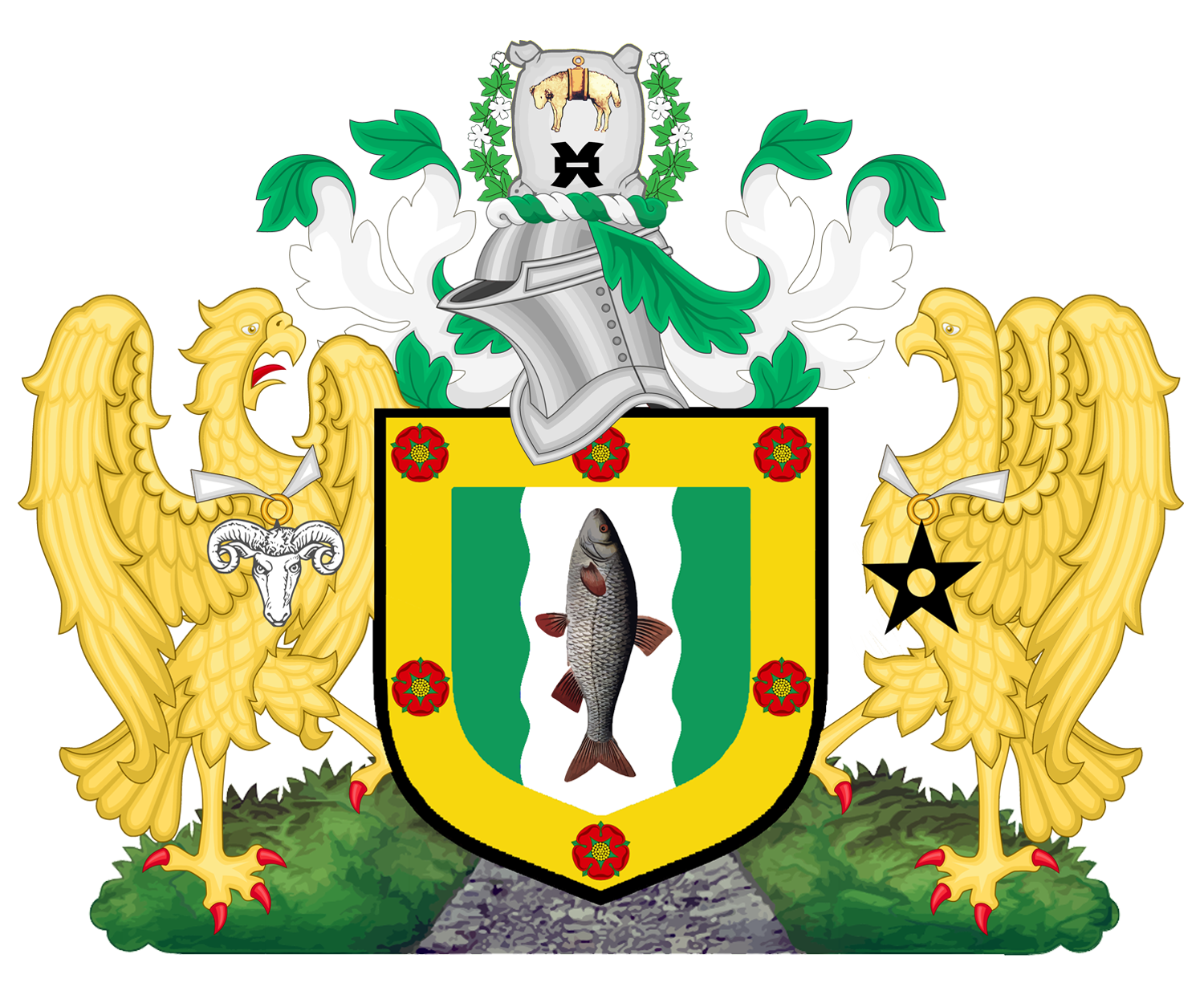
- 7 May 2026

20 out of 60 seats to Rochdale Borough Council 31 seats needed for a majority
	First party	Second party	Third party
Leader	Neil Emmott	Jordan Tarrant-Short	Stephen Anstee
Party	Labour	Reform	Conservative
Last election	44 seats, 42.1%	0 seats, 1.5%	9 seats, 18.5%
Seats before	43	2	8
Seats won	2	13	2
Seats after	31	15	7
Seat change	▼12	▲13	▼1
Popular vote	16,858	23,103	7,178
Percentage	25.6%	35.0%	10.9%
Swing	▼16.5%	▲33.5%	▼7.6%
	Fourth party	Fifth party	Sixth party
Leader	Farooq Ahmed	Andy Kelly	Keeley O'Mara
Party	Workers Party	Liberal Democrats	Middleton Ind.
Last election	2 seats, 13.4%	3 seats, 11.8%	2 seats, 7.4%
Seats before	2	3	2
Seats won	2	1	0
Seats after	4	3	0
Seat change	▲2	Steady	▼2
Popular vote	5,332	5,090	936
Percentage	8.1%	7.7%	1.4%
Swing	▼5.3%	▼4.1%	▼6.0%
- Winner of each seat at the 2026 Rochdale Borough Council election.
Leader before election
Neil Emmott
Labour
Leader after election
Neil Emmott
Labour

The 2026 Rochdale Borough Council election took place on Thursday 7 May 2026, alongside other local elections in the United Kingdom. One third of the 60 members of Rochdale Borough Council in Greater Manchester were elected.

Labour retained overall control of the council, but with a significantly reduced majority. Reform UK won most seats at this election, becoming the second largest party on the council.

== Council composition ==
After 2024 election		Before 2026 election	
Party	Seats	Party	Seats
Labour	44	Labour	43
Conservative	9	Conservative	8
Liberal Democrats	3	Liberal Democrats	3
Middleton Ind.	2	Middleton Ind.	2
Workers Party	2	Workers Party	2
Reform	0	Reform	2

Changes 2024–2026:

- August 2024: John Taylor (Conservative) leaves party to sit as an independent
- September 2024: Peter Allonby (Middleton Independents) disqualified due to non-attendance – by-election held October 2024
- October 2024: Keeley O'Mara (Middleton Independents) wins by-election
- March 2025: Elsie Blundell (Labour) resigns – by-election held May 2025
- May 2025: Jordan Tarrant-Short (Reform) gains by-election from Labour
- July 2025: John Taylor (Independent) joins Reform

== Background ==
Like much of Greater Manchester, Labour has historically been strong in Rochdale. The Conservatives briefly held a majority in 1976, and the Liberal Democrats were the largest party from 2004 to 2011; aside from these periods, Labour has formed the administration of the council as either a majority or minority. The 2024 election saw Labour lose two seats to the Workers Party of Britain, following on from George Galloway's victory in the parliamentary by-election earlier in 2024, and retain a seat gained through a defection from the Middleton Independents Party. No other seats changed hands.

A new set of ward boundaries was used for the 2022 election. This election will be for the councillors elected with the highest number of votes in each of the twenty three-member wards. Labour are defending fourteen seats, the Conservatives are defending three, the Middleton Independents are defending two, and the Liberal Democrats are defending one.

== Summary ==
=== Election result ===
2026 Rochdale Metropolitan Borough Council election
Party	This election				Full council			This election		
Party	Candidates	Seats	Net	Seats %	Other	Total	Total %	Votes	Votes %	+/−
Labour	{{{candidates}}}	2	▼12	10.0	29	31	51.7	16,858	25.6	–16.5
Reform	{{{candidates}}}	13	▲13	65.0	2	15	25.0	23,103	35.0	+33.5
Conservative	{{{candidates}}}	2	▼1	10.0	5	7	11.7	7,178	10.9	–7.6
Workers Party	{{{candidates}}}	2	▲2	10.0	2	4	6.7	5,332	8.1	–5.3
Liberal Democrats	{{{candidates}}}	1	Steady	5.0	2	3	5.0	5,090	7.7	–4.1
Green	{{{candidates}}}	0	Steady	0.0	0	0	0.0	7,208	10.9	+7.9
Middleton Ind.	{{{candidates}}}	0	▼2	0.0	0	0	0.0	936	1.4	–6.0
Advance UK	{{{candidates}}}	0	Steady	0.0	0	0	0.0	52	0.1	N/A
Independent	{{{candidates}}}	0	Steady	0.0	0	0	0.0	195	0.3	–2.0

== Incumbents ==
Ward	Incumbent councillor	Party	Re-standing
Balderstone & Kirkholt	Philip Massey	Labour	Yes
Bamford	Angela Smith	Conservative	Yes
Castleton	Billy Sheerin	Labour	Yes
Central Rochdale	Iftikhar Ahmed	Labour	Yes
East Middleton	Paul Beswick	Middleton Ind.	Yes
Healey	Shaun O'Neill	Labour	Yes
Hopwood Hall	Susan Emmott	Labour	Yes
Kingsway	Shakil Ahmed	Labour	Yes
Littleborough Lakeside	Janet Emsley	Labour	Yes
Milkstone & Deeplish	Mohammed Arshad	Labour	Yes
Milnrow & Newhey	Irene Davidson	Liberal Democrats	Yes
Norden	James Gartside	Conservative	No
North Heywood	Liam O'Rourke	Labour	No
North Middleton	Keeley O'Mara (Note: Elected at the 2024 North Middleton by-election.)	Middleton Ind.	Yes
Smallbridge & Firgrove	Aftab Hussain	Labour	Yes
South Middleton	Peter Williams	Labour	Yes
Spotland & Falinge	Iram Faisal	Labour	Yes
Wardle, Shore & West; Littleborough	Ashley Dearnley	Conservative	No
West Heywood	Angela Brown	Labour	Yes
West Middleton	Phil Burke	Labour	Yes

== Ward results ==
=== Balderstone & Kirkholt ===
Balderstone & Kirkholt
Party	Candidate	Votes	%	±%
Reform	Ashley-Louise Gilbert	1,205	42.4	N/A
Labour	Philip Massey	722	25.4	−27.5
Green	Sami Mir	349	12.3	+5.0
Workers Party	Altaf Nadeem	275	9.7	−9.6
Conservative	John Kershaw	160	5.6	−8.9
Liberal Democrats	Rob Chilton	129	4.5	−1.4
Majority		483	17.0	N/A
Turnout		2,840	33.3	+8.5
Registered electors		8,533		
Reform gain from Labour				

=== Bamford ===
Bamford
Party	Candidate	Votes	%	±%
Conservative	Angela Smith	1,230	34.5	−7.6
Reform	Christopher Birchenough	1,009	28.3	N/A
Green	George Hilton	566	15.9	+10.4
Labour	Duncan Hannant	466	13.1	−12.5
Workers Party	Bahadur Kamran	293	8.2	−15.8
Majority		221	6.2	–10.3
Turnout		3,564	43.2	+2.3
Registered electors		8,245		
Conservative hold				

=== Castleton ===
Castleton
Party	Candidate	Votes	%	±%
Reform	Dave Jones	1,379	44.7	N/A
Labour	Billy Sheerin	719	23.3	−11.5
Green	Jonathan Kershaw	638	20.7	+13.6
Conservative	Malcolm Bywater	197	6.4	−9.6
Liberal Democrats	Sharon Harrison	150	4.9	−0.2
Majority		660	21.4	N/A
Turnout		3,083	37.4	+4.1
Registered electors		8,249		
Reform gain from Labour				

=== Central Rochdale ===
Central Rochdale
Party	Candidate	Votes	%	±%
Workers Party	Waqar Khan	1,944	47.3	−5.7
Labour	Iftikhar Ahmed	1,424	34.7	−5.8
Green	Peter Cloran	395	9.6	N/A
Reform	Samantha Payne	269	6.5	N/A
Conservative	Catherine Leach	77	1.9	−0.9
Majority		520	12.6	+0.1
Turnout		4,109	43.7	+1.3
Registered electors		9,400		
Workers Party gain from Labour		Swing	▲0.1	

=== East Middleton ===
East Middleton
Party	Candidate	Votes	%	±%
Labour	Gina Jacques	1,315	40.1	−27.8
Reform	Mervyn Simpson	1,215	37.0	N/A
Middleton Ind.	Paul Beswick	337	10.3	−14.1
Green	Clare Wood	265	8.1	N/A
Conservative	Michael Smith	149	4.5	−1.8
Majority		100	3.1	–40.4
Turnout		3,281	38.4	+4.0
Registered electors		8,549		
Labour gain from Middleton Ind.				

=== Healey ===
Healey
Party	Candidate	Votes	%	±%
Reform	Mark Stephens	1,300	37.5	N/A
Labour	Shaun O’Neill	772	22.3	−15.4
Liberal Democrats	Andy Lord	528	15.2	−1.7
Green	Umar Ali	441	12.7	+9.4
Workers Party	Raja Miah	237	6.8	−13.7
Conservative	Robert McLean	190	5.5	−16.0
Majority		528	15.2	N/A
Turnout		3,468	43.2	+6.8
Registered electors		8,035		
Reform gain from Labour				

=== Hopwood Hall ===
Hopwood Hall
Party	Candidate	Votes	%	±%
Reform	Steve Potter	1,536	47.9	+32.3
Labour	Susan Emmott	856	26.7	−23.4
Conservative	Stephen Spencer-Jones	319	9.9	−4.3
Green	Robert King	290	9.0	N/A
Liberal Democrats	Iain Donaldson	157	4.9	−2.9
Advance UK	Alan Shaw	52	1.6	N/A
Majority		680	21.2	N/A
Turnout		3,210	36.0	+7.3
Registered electors		8,910		
Reform gain from Labour				

=== Kingsway ===
Kingsway
Party	Candidate	Votes	%	±%
Labour	Shakil Ahmed	1,176	34.4	−7.2
Workers Party	Mohammed Saleem	820	24.0	−4.2
Reform	Denise Harrison	812	23.7	N/A
Green	Mark Hollindrake	364	10.6	+2.0
Conservative	Steven Edgar	132	3.9	−6.4
Liberal Democrats	Jenny Kelly	117	3.4	−7.8
Majority		356	10.4	–3.0
Turnout		3,421	40.4	+5.6
Registered electors		8,472		
Labour hold		Swing	▼1.5	

=== Littleborough Lakeside ===
Littleborough Lakeside
Party	Candidate	Votes	%	±%
Reform	Victoria Howard	1,391	40.7	N/A
Labour	Janet Emsley	1,170	34.3	−20.6
Conservative	Ian Jackson	454	13.3	−22.8
Green	Paul Wooten	274	8.0	+1.0
Liberal Democrats	Emma Griffin	125	3.7	+2.3
Majority		221	6.4	N/A
Turnout		3,414	46.0	+10.0
Registered electors		7,414		
Reform gain from Labour				

=== Milkstone and Deeplish ===
Milkstone and Deeplish
Party	Candidate	Votes	%	±%
Workers Party	Mohammed Shafiq	1,560	49.7	−12.7
Labour	Mohammad Arshad	1,017	32.4	+7.9
Green	Neil Rutter	296	9.4	+5.6
Reform	Stuart Mather	161	5.1	N/A
Liberal Democrats	Majdi Aldimashqi	64	2.0	−3.2
Conservative	Len Branton	38	1.2	−2.9
Majority		543	17.3	–20.6
Turnout		3,136	39.9	+2.5
Registered electors		7,850		
Workers Party gain from Labour		Swing	▼10.3	

=== Milnrow and Newhey ===
Milnrow and Newhey
Party	Candidate	Votes	%	±%
Reform	Anthony Gilbert	1,400	39.1	N/A
Liberal Democrats	Irene Davidson	1,306	36.4	−19.2
Labour	Avis Gilmore	519	14.5	−16.4
Green	Jack Gower	217	6.1	+2.4
Conservative	Milton Danczuk	128	3.6	−4.1
Workers Party	Mohammed Shafiq	13	0.4	−1.7
Majority		94	2.7	N/A
Turnout		3,583	42.0	+5.9
Registered electors		8,528		
Reform gain from Liberal Democrats				

=== Norden ===
Norden
Party	Candidate	Votes	%	±%
Conservative	Paul Ellison	1,662	42.2	−6.3
Reform	Kevin Lane	1,193	30.3	N/A
Labour	Sue Moore-Holmes	495	12.6	−19.8
Green	Sarah Croke	431	11.0	+4.7
Liberal Democrats	Stephanie Robertson	154	3.9	−3.9
Majority		469	11.9	–4.2
Turnout		3,935	48.4	+11.1
Registered electors		8,123		
Conservative hold				

=== North Heywood ===
North Heywood
Party	Candidate	Votes	%	±%
Reform	Michael Howard	1,365	53.8	+32.3
Labour	Lewis Woodall	597	23.5	−29.7
Green	Naomi Brown	310	12.2	N/A
Conservative	Sam Bancroft	144	5.7	−10.4
Liberal Democrats	Steve Gillian	123	4.8	−0.9
Majority		768	21.3	N/A
Turnout		2,539	31.5	+7.4
Registered electors		8,060		
Reform gain from Labour				

=== North Middleton ===
North Middleton
Party	Candidate	Votes	%	±%
Reform	Lee Wolf	1,450	44.8	N/A
Middleton Ind.	Keely O’Mara	599	18.5	−24.9
Labour	Connor Stanisauskis	562	17.4	−30.9
Green	James Luckham	410	12.7	N/A
Conservative	Eileen Taylor	141	4.4	−2.2
Liberal Democrats	Chariss Peacock	73	2.3	+0.6
Majority		851	26.3	N/A
Turnout		3,235	34.7	+4.8
Registered electors		9,320		
Reform gain from Middleton Ind.				

=== Smallbridge and Firgrove ===
Smallbridge and Firgrove
Party	Candidate	Votes	%	±%
Liberal Democrats	Mohammed Khizer	917	30.3	−5.7
Reform	Cole Brierley	850	28.1	N/A
Labour	Aftab Hussain	638	21.1	−26.9
Green	Feruz Ali	332	11.0	N/A
Independent	Billy Howarth	160	5.3	N/A
Conservative	Charlotte Taylor	126	4.2	−11.8
Majority		67	2.2	N/A
Turnout		3,068	35.3	+7.9
Registered electors		8,694		
Liberal Democrats gain from Labour				

=== South Middleton ===
South Middleton
Party	Candidate	Votes	%	±%
Reform	Matthew Pilkington	1,674	44.2	N/A
Labour	Peter Williams	1,238	32.7	−18.3
Green	Sunday Onabanjo	392	10.3	N/A
Conservative	Stacey Bancroft	308	8.1	−4.5
Liberal Democrats	Sam Ellis	176	4.6	+1.6
Majority		436	11.5	N/A
Turnout		3,788	42.7	+7.1
Registered electors		8,881		
Reform gain from Labour				

=== Spotland and Falinge ===
Spotland and Falinge
Party	Candidate	Votes	%	±%
Reform	Carl Faulkner	1,018	30.5	N/A
Labour	Iram Faisal	1,009	30.2	−12.4
Liberal Democrats	Rabina Asghar	689	20.6	−7.3
Green	Mick Coats	307	9.2	N/A
Workers Party	Benita Blessing	151	4.5	N/A
Conservative	Ann Conway	134	4.0	−2.8
Independent	Stefan Cholenka	35	1.0	−21.7
Majority		9	0.3	N/A
Turnout		3,343	39.0	+3.3
Registered electors		8,567		
Reform gain from Labour				

=== Wardle, Shore and West Littleborough ===
Wardle, Shore and West Littleborough
Party	Candidate	Votes	%	±%
Reform	Philip Barrett	1,466	40.0	N/A
Conservative	Matthew Hargreaves	1,209	33.0	−27.3
Labour	Joshua McCarron	451	12.3	−5.3
Green	Adam Mir	328	9.0	+1.4
Liberal Democrats	Kim Ho	169	4.6	−8.0
Workers Party	Laura Pugh	39	1.1	−0.8
Majority		257	7.0	N/A
Turnout		3,662	43.8	+13.1
Registered electors		8,358		
Reform gain from Conservative				

=== West Heywood ===
West Heywood
Party	Candidate	Votes	%	±%
Reform	Stuart Crawford	1,474	49.6	N/A
Labour	Angela Brown	921	31.0	−22.0
Green	Ethan Towers	215	7.2	N/A
Liberal Democrats	Tom Shaw	213	7.2	−11.8
Conservative	Adele Anstee	151	5.1	−18.9
Majority		553	18.6	N/A
Turnout		2,974	33.9	+10.2
Registered electors		8,772		
Reform gain from Labour				

=== West Middleton ===
West Middleton
Party	Candidate	Votes	%	±%
Reform	Trevor Taylor	936	39.9	N/A
Labour	Phil Burke	791	33.7	−16.6
Green	Caitlin Furlong	388	16.6	N/A
Conservative	Matthew Roughsedge	229	9.8	+2.2
Majority		145	6.2	N/A
Turnout		2,344	29.9	+2.5
Registered electors		7,846		
Reform gain from Labour				
