= 2024 Rochdale Metropolitan Borough Council election =

UK local election

2024 Rochdale Council election
- 2 May 2024

20 out of 60 seats of Rochdale Metropolitan Borough Council 31 seats needed for a majority

	First party	Second party	Third party
Leader	Neil Emmott	John Taylor	Andy Kelly
Party	Labour	Conservative	Liberal Democrats
Last election	16 seats, 56.5%	3 seats, 19.6%	1 seat, 11.9%
Seats before	46	9	3
Seats won	14	3	1
Seats after	44	9	3
Seat change	▼2	Steady	Steady
Popular vote	22,717	10,003	6,345
Percentage	42.1%	18.5%	11.8%
Swing	▼9.1%	▼3.6%	▲0.3%
	Fourth party	Fifth party
Leader		Lee Wolf
Party	Workers Party	Middleton Ind.
Last election	N/A	0 seats, 5.0%
Seats before	0	2
Seats won	2	0
Seats after	2	2
Seat change	▲2	Steady
Popular vote	7,234	3,971
Percentage	13.4%	7.4%
Swing	N/A	▲0.8%
- Winner of each seat at the 2024 Rochdale Metropolitan Borough Council election
Leader before election
Neil Emmott
Labour
Leader after election
Neil Emmott
Labour

The 2024 Rochdale Metropolitan Borough Council elections took place on 2 May 2024 alongside the 2024 Greater Manchester mayoral election and other local elections across the United Kingdom. One third of seats (20) on Rochdale Metropolitan Borough Council were contested. The council remained under Labour majority control.

== Background ==
The council has had an overall Labour majority since 2011. In the previous election in 2023, Labour won 16 seats with 56.5% of the vote gaining three councillors, the Conservatives won three seats with 19.6% of the vote losing one councillor, the Liberal Democrats won 1 seat with 11.9% of the vote, and the Middleton Independents Party won no seats from 5% of the vote losing two councillors.

On 19 February 2024, Farooq Ahmed, a Liberal Democrat candidate for Central Ward, was suspended by the party after being photographed campaigning with George Galloway in the 2024 Rochdale by-election.

== Electoral process ==
The council generally elects its councillors in thirds, with a third being up for election every year for three years, with no election in the fourth year. The election will be conducted using the first-past-the-post voting system, with each ward electing one councillor.

All registered electors (British, Irish, Commonwealth and European Union citizens) living in Rochdale aged 18 or over will be entitled to vote in the election. People who live at two addresses in different councils, such as university students with different term-time and holiday addresses, are entitled to be registered for and vote in elections in both local authorities. Voting in-person at polling stations will take place from 07:00 to 22:00 on election day, and voters will be able to apply for postal votes or proxy votes in advance of the election.

== Summary ==
Labour lost two seats to the Workers Party of Britain, but retained its overall majority on the council.

=== Election result ===
2024 Rochdale Metropolitan Borough Council election
Party	This election				Full council			This election		
Party	Candidates	Seats	Net	Seats %	Other	Total	Total %	Votes	Votes %	+/−
Labour	{{{candidates}}}	14	▼2	70.0	30	44	73.3	22,717	42.1	–9.1
Conservative	{{{candidates}}}	3	Steady	15.0	6	9	15.0	10,003	18.5	–3.6
Liberal Democrats	{{{candidates}}}	1	Steady	5.0	2	3	5.0	6,345	11.8	+0.3
Workers Party	{{{candidates}}}	2	▲2	10.0	0	2	3.3	7,234	13.4	N/A
Middleton Ind.	{{{candidates}}}	0	Steady	0.0	2	2	3.3	3,971	7.4	+0.8
Green	{{{candidates}}}	0	Steady	0.0	0	0	0.0	1,640	3.0	–4.2
Independent	{{{candidates}}}	0	Steady	0.0	0	0	0.0	1,262	2.3	+1.1
Reform	{{{candidates}}}	0	Steady	0.0	0	0	0.0	788	1.5	N/A

== Ward results ==
=== Balderstone & Kirkholt ===
Balderstone & Kirkholt
Party	Candidate	Votes	%	±%
Labour Co-op	Daniel Joseph Meredith	1,086	52.9	–5.5
Workers Party	William Howarth	395	19.3	N/A
Conservative	Leonard Keith Branton	298	14.5	–8.9
Green	Mick Coats	150	7.3	–2.3
Liberal Democrats	John Swarbrick	122	5.9	N/A
Majority		691	33.6	
Turnout		2,051	24.8	
Registered electors		8,277		
Labour Co-op hold				

=== Bamford ===
Bamford
Party	Candidate	Votes	%	±%
Conservative	Philip Michael Beal	1,394	42.1	–11.7
Labour Co-op	Lewis Chadwick Woodall	850	25.6	–9.6
Workers Party	Jamil Akhtar	794	24.0	N/A
Green	Peter Corby	182	5.5	N/A
Liberal Democrats	Zarah Kauser	95	2.9	–8.1
Majority		544	16.5	
Turnout		3,344	40.9	
Registered electors		8,176		
Conservative hold		Swing	▼1.1	

=== Castleton ===
Castleton
Party	Candidate	Votes	%	±%
Labour	Aisling Gallagher*	899	34.8	–4.6
Independent	David Jones	569	22.0	+2.2
Conservative	Malcolm Thomas Bywater	413	16.0	–5.1
Workers Party	Thomas James Byrne	391	15.1	N/A
Green	Jonathan Edward Kershaw	183	7.1	–2.4
Liberal Democrats	Sharon Harrison	132	5.1	–5.0
Majority		330	12.8	
Turnout		2,602	33.2	
Registered electors		7,847		
Labour hold		Swing	▼3.4	

=== Central Rochdale ===
Central Rochdale
Party	Candidate	Votes	%	±%
Workers Party	Farooq Ahmed	2,016	53.0	N/A
Labour	Ali Ahmed*	1,541	40.5	–32.4
Liberal Democrats	Naveed Akhtar	144	3.8	–13.8
Conservative	Shajan Ali	106	2.8	–6.7
Majority		475	12.5	
Turnout		3,855	42.4	
Registered electors		9,099		
Workers Party gain from Labour				

=== East Middleton ===
East Middleton
Party	Candidate	Votes	%	±%
Labour	Dylan James Williams*	1,974	67.9	+6.2
Middleton Ind.	Bernard Peter Wynne	709	24.4	–2.7
Conservative	Gillian Louise Jackson	183	6.3	–4.9
Liberal Democrats	Barrie Nicholson	40	1.4	N/A
Majority		1,265	43.5	
Turnout		2,910	34.4	
Registered electors		8,468		
Labour hold		Swing	▲4.5	

Dylan Williams was elected for the Middleton Independents Party before joining Labour in 2022.

=== Healey ===
Healey
Party	Candidate	Votes	%	±%
Labour	Shah Wazir	1,086	37.7	–31.2
Conservative	Paul Simon Ellison	618	21.5	–1.1
Workers Party	Amr Nazir	591	20.5	N/A
Liberal Democrats	Andy Lord	487	16.9	+8.4
Green	Anja Jungmayr	96	3.3	N/A
Majority		468	16.2	
Turnout		2,903	36.7	
Registered electors		7,904		
Labour hold		Swing	▼15.1	

=== Hopwood Hall ===
Hopwood Hall
Party	Candidate	Votes	%	±%
Labour	Carol Elizabeth Wardle*	1,220	50.1	–14.8
Reform	Steve Potter	380	15.6	N/A
Conservative	Claudius Chonzi	346	14.2	–4.5
Middleton Ind.	Caitlin Victoria O'mara	302	12.4	+0.6
Liberal Democrats	Iain Donaldson	189	7.8	+3.2
Majority		840	34.5	
Turnout		2,462	28.7	
Registered electors		8,592		
Labour hold				

=== Kingsway ===
Kingsway
Party	Candidate	Votes	%	±%
Labour	Daalat Ali*	1,197	41.6	–27.0
Workers Party	Haroon Nawaz Khan	811	28.2	N/A
Liberal Democrats	Saghir Ahmed	323	11.2	+2.9
Conservative	Lynn Butterworth	297	10.3	–5.7
Green	Mark Hollinrake	247	8.6	+1.5
Majority		386	13.4	
Turnout		2,902	34.8	
Registered electors		8,346		
Labour hold				

=== Littleborough Lakeside ===
Littleborough Lakeside
Party	Candidate	Votes	%	±%
Labour Co-op	Tom Besford*	1,436	54.9	+10.8
Conservative	Ian Spencer Jackson	946	36.1	–7.8
Green	Hannah Macguire	182	7.0	–2.6
Liberal Democrats	Safina Kauser	36	1.4	–1.2
Workers Party	Uzair Mehmood	17	0.6	N/A
Majority		490	18.8	
Turnout		2,640	36.0	
Registered electors		7,342		
Labour Co-op hold		Swing	▲9.3	

=== Milkstone & Deeplish ===
Milkstone & Deeplish
Party	Candidate	Votes	%	±%
Workers Party	Minaam Ellahi	1,812	62.4	N/A
Labour	Shahid Mohammed*	713	24.5	–55.5
Liberal Democrats	Rifat Mahmood	152	5.2	–4.6
Conservative	Philip Edward Starr	118	4.1	–2.1
Green	Feruz Ali	111	3.8	–0.2
Majority		1,099	37.9	
Turnout		2,906	37.4	
Registered electors		7,778		
Workers Party gain from Labour				

=== Milnrow & Newhey ===
Milnrow & Newhey
Party	Candidate	Votes	%	±%
Liberal Democrats	Andy Kelly*	1,684	55.6	+8.4
Labour	Avis Kay Gilmore	936	30.9	–3.1
Conservative	Aidan James Forshaw	233	7.7	–5.0
Green	Feruz Ali	111	3.7	–2.4
Workers Party	Jordan Rashida	64	2.1	N/A
Majority		748	24.7	
Turnout		3,050	36.1	
Registered electors		8,452		
Liberal Democrats hold		Swing	▲5.8	

=== Norden ===
Norden
Party	Candidate	Votes	%	±%
Conservative	Peter Winkler*	1,448	48.5	–5.4
Labour	Sue Moore-Holmes	968	32.4	+8.9
Liberal Democrats	Stephanie Robertson	233	7.8	–6.3
Green	Sarah Croke	188	6.3	–2.1
Workers Party	Sana Aziz	147	4.9	N/A
Majority		480	16.1	
Turnout		3,005	37.3	
Registered electors		8,050		
Conservative hold		Swing	▼7.2	

=== North Heywood ===
North Heywood
Party	Candidate	Votes	%	±%
Labour	Paul O'Neill	1,009	53.2	–25.4
Reform	Mike Howard	408	21.5	N/A
Conservative	Jordan Tarrant-Short	305	16.1	–5.3
Liberal Democrats	Jennifer Kelly	109	5.7	N/A
Workers Party	Saliah Begum	66	3.5	N/A
Majority		601	31.7	
Turnout		1,913	24.1	
Registered electors		7,942		
Labour hold				

=== North Middleton ===
North Middleton
Party	Candidate	Votes	%	±%
Labour	Kathryn Bromfield	1,294	48.3	–1.7
Middleton Ind.	Keely O'Mara	1,163	43.4	+2.7
Conservative	Aaron Slack	177	6.6	–2.6
Liberal Democrats	Chariss Peacock	46	1.7	N/A
Majority		131	4.9	
Turnout		2,690	29.9	
Registered electors		8,987		
Labour hold		Swing	▼2.0	

=== Smallbridge & Firgrove ===
Smallbridge & Firgrove
Party	Candidate	Votes	%	±%
Labour	John Blundell*	1,094	48.0	–3.2
Liberal Democrats	Zulfiqar Ali	820	36.0	+9.1
Conservative	Eileen Taylor	365	16.0	+2.9
Majority		274	12.0	
Turnout		2,336	27.4	
Registered electors		8,516		
Labour hold		Swing	▼6.2	

=== South Middleton ===
South Middleton
Party	Candidate	Votes	%	±%
Labour	June West*	1,571	51.0	–0.8
Middleton Ind.	Lee Wolf	1,030	33.4	+1.6
Conservative	Tracy Furnell	389	12.6	–3.9
Liberal Democrats	Tony Hughes	91	3.0	N/A
Majority		541	17.6	
Turnout		3,103	35.6	
Registered electors		8,726		
Labour hold		Swing	▼1.2	

=== Spotland & Falinge ===
Spotland & Falinge
Party	Candidate	Votes	%	±%
Labour	Faisal Rana*	1,297	42.6	–6.7
Liberal Democrats	Rabina Asghar	849	27.9	–10.2
Independent	Carl Faulkner	693	22.7	N/A
Conservative	Ann Conway	208	6.8	+0.2
Majority		448	14.7	
Turnout		3,064	35.7	
Registered electors		8,585		
Labour hold		Swing	▲1.8	

=== Wardle, Shore & West Littleborough ===
Wardle, Shore & West Littleborough
Party	Candidate	Votes	%	±%
Conservative	Adam Branton	1,515	60.3	+0.7
Labour	Farhat Kazmi	442	17.6	–9.7
Liberal Democrats	Kim Ho	317	12.6	+6.8
Green	Martyn Savin	190	7.6	+0.2
Workers Party	Ali Shahid	49	1.9	N/A
Majority		1,073	42.7	
Turnout		2,540	30.7	
Registered electors		8,276		
Conservative hold		Swing	▲5.2	

=== West Heywood ===
West Heywood
Party	Candidate	Votes	%	±%
Labour	Peter Joinson	1,080	53.0	–7.4
Conservative	Stephen Spencer-Jones	490	24.0	–3.7
Liberal Democrats	Tom Shaw	387	19.0	+7.2
Workers Party	Umar Malik	81	4.0	N/A
Majority		590	29.0	
Turnout		2,064	23.7	
Registered electors		8,709		
Labour hold		Swing	▼1.9	

=== West Middleton ===
West Middleton
Party	Candidate	Votes	%	±%
Labour	Susan Smith*	1,024	50.3	–10.6
Middleton Ind.	Janene Walker	767	37.7	+12.1
Conservative	Matt Roughsedge	154	7.6	–0.9
Liberal Democrats	Nikki Edwards	89	4.4	–0.5
Majority		257	12.6	
Turnout		2,047	27.4	
Registered electors		7,475		
Labour hold		Swing	▼11.4	

== Changes 2024-2026 ==
=== By-elections ===
==== North Middleton ====
A by-election was triggered after councillor Peter Allonby was disqualified from the council after failing to attend any meetings for six consecutive months.

North Middleton by-election: 31 October 2024
Party	Candidate	Votes	%	±%
Middleton Ind.	Keeley O'Mara	812	51.7	+8.3
Labour	Donna Martin	572	36.4	–11.9
Conservative	Sajid Majid	108	6.9	+0.3
Liberal Democrats	Iain Donaldson	80	5.1	+3.4
Majority		240	15.3	N/A
Turnout		1,577	17.2	–12.7
Registered electors		9,143		
Middleton Ind. hold		Swing	▲10.1	

==== Balderstone & Kirkholt ====
A by-election was triggered after the resignation of councillor Elsie Blundell.

Balderstone & Kirkholt by-election: 1 May 2025
Party	Candidate	Votes	%	±%
Reform	Jordan Tarrant-Short	766	32.5	N/A
Labour	Leanne Greenwood	624	26.5	–26.4
Workers Party	Laura Pugh	398	16.9	–2.4
Conservative	Mudassar Razzaq	212	9.0	–5.5
Independent	Billy Howarth	180	7.6	N/A
Liberal Democrats	Chariss Peacock	109	4.6	–1.3
Green	Martyn Savin	65	2.8	–4.5
Majority		142	6.0	N/A
Turnout		2,362		
Reform gain from Labour				
