= Karen Burke (disambiguation) =

Karen Burke (born 1971) is an English footballer.

Karen Burke may also refer to:

- Karen C. Burke, American legal scholar
- Karen Danczuk (née Burke), British local councillor for Kingsway, Rochdale metro
