= 2023 Rochdale Metropolitan Borough Council election =

2023 local election in Rochdale

2023 Rochdale Metropolitan Council election
← 2022	4 May 2023	2024 →

20 out of 60 seats of Rochdale Metropolitan Borough Council 31 seats needed for a majority

	First party	Second party
Leader	Neil Emmott	John Taylor
Party	Labour	Conservative
Last election	42 seats, 50.8%	10 seats, 20.3%
Seats won	16	3
Seats after	46	9
Seat change	▲3	▼1
Popular vote	27,837	9,667
Percentage	56.5%	19.6%
Swing	▲5.7%	▼0.9%
	Third party	Fourth party
Leader	Andy Kelly	Lee Wolf
Party	Liberal Democrats	Middleton Ind.
Last election	3 seats, 17.3%	5 seats, 9.1%
Seats won	1	0
Seats after	3	2
Seat change	0	▼2
Popular vote	5,865	2,461
Percentage	11.9%	5.0%
Swing	▼5.4%	▼4.1%
- The winner of each seat in the 2023 Rochdale Metropolitan Borough Council Election
Leader before election
Neil Emmott
Labour
Leader after election
Neil Emmott
Labour

The 2023 Rochdale Metropolitan Borough Council elections took place on 4 May 2023 alongside other local elections across the United Kingdom. One third of seats (20) on Rochdale Metropolitan Borough Council were contested.

Labour retained its majority on the council.

== Background ==
The Local Government Act 1972 created a two-tier system of metropolitan counties and districts covering Greater Manchester, Merseyside, South Yorkshire, Tyne and Wear, the West Midlands, and West Yorkshire starting in 1974. Rochdale was a district of the Greater Manchester metropolitan county. The Local Government Act 1985 abolished the metropolitan counties, with metropolitan districts taking on most of their powers as metropolitan boroughs. The Greater Manchester Combined Authority was created in 2011 and began electing the mayor of Greater Manchester from 2017, which was given strategic powers covering a region coterminous with the former Greater Manchester metropolitan county.

Since its formation, Rochdale has variously been under Labour control, Liberal Democrat control, Conservative control and no overall control. Councillors have predominantly been elected from the Labour Party, Liberal Democrats and the Conservative Party, with some independent councillors also serving. The council has had an overall Labour majority since the 2011.

In the most recent election in 2022, where all 60 seats on the council were up for election, Labour won 42 seats with 50% of the vote, the Conservatives won ten seats with 20% of the vote, the Middleton Independents Party won five seats with 9% of the vote and the Liberal Democrats won three seats with 17% of the vote.

== Electoral process ==
The council generally elects its councillors in thirds, with a third being up for election every year for three years, with no election in the fourth year. The election will be conducted using the first-past-the-post voting system, with each ward electing one councillor.

All registered electors (British, Irish, Commonwealth and European Union citizens) living in Rochdale aged 18 or over were entitled to vote in the election. People who lived at two addresses in different councils, such as university students with different term-time and holiday addresses, were entitled to be registered for and vote in elections in both local authorities. Voting in-person at polling stations took place from 07:00 to 22:00 on election day, and voters were able to apply for postal votes or proxy votes in advance of the election.

== Results summary ==
2023 Rochdale Metropolitan Borough Council election
Party	This election			Full council			This election		
Party	Seats	Net	Seats %	Other	Total	Total %	Votes	Votes %	+/−
Labour	16	3 ▲	80.0	30	46	76.7	26,198	51.2	
Conservative	3	1 ▼	15.0	6	9	15.0	11,306	22.1	
Liberal Democrats	1	0	5.0	2	3	5.0	5,865	11.5	
Green	0	0	0.0	0	0	0.0	3,664	7.2	
Middleton Ind.	0	2 ▼	0.0	2	2	3.3	3,368	6.6	
Independent	0	0	0.0	0	0	0.0	607	1.2	
Freedom Alliance	0	0	0.0	0	0	0.0	197	0.4	

== Ward results ==
Asterisks denote incumbent councillors seeking re-election.

=== Balderstone & Kirkholt ===
Balderstone & Kirkholt
Party	Candidate	Votes	%	±%
Labour	Elsie Blundell	1,124	58.4	+8.9
Conservative	Mudassar Razzaq	451	23.4	−0.1
Green	Jordan Eves	185	9.6	−5.5
Independent	Laura Grabowska	164	8.5	+1.9
Majority		673	35.0	
Turnout		1,924		
Labour hold				

=== Bamford ===
Bamford
Party	Candidate	Votes	%	±%
Conservative	Steve Anstee	1,580	53.8	+6.2
Labour	Rosie Choudhury	1,033	35.2	+2.5
Liberal Democrats	Siobhain Cunnane	324	11.0	−1.5
Majority		547	18.6	
Turnout		2,937		
Conservative hold				

=== Castleton ===
Castleton
Party	Candidate	Votes	%	±%
Labour	Aasim Rashid	882	39.4	−5.4
Conservative	Malcolm Bywater	473	21.1	−6.1
Independent	David Jones	443	19.8	N/A
Liberal Democrats	John Swarbrick	227	10.1	−6.3
Green	Jonathan Kershaw	213	9.5	N/A
Majority		409		
Turnout		2,238		
Labour hold				

=== Central Rochdale ===
Central Rochdale
Party	Candidate	Votes	%	±%
Labour	Sameena Zaheer	2,487	72.9	+20.9
Liberal Democrats	Abdul Ghafoor	601	17.6	−18.0
Conservative	Shajan Ali	323	9.5	+5.5
Majority		1,886	55.3	
Turnout		3,411		
Labour hold				

=== East Middleton ===
East Middleton
Party	Candidate	Votes	%	±%
Labour	Terry Smith	1,588	61.7	+19.5
Middleton Ind.	Bernard Wynne	697	27.1	−17.9
Conservative	Aaron Slack	289	11.2	N/A
Majority		891	34.6	
Turnout		2,574		
Labour gain from Middleton Ind.				

=== Healey ===
Healey
Party	Candidate	Votes	%	±%
Labour	Tricia Ayrton	1,789	68.9	+17.9
Conservative	Sajid Mahmood	587	22.6	−9.4
Liberal Democrats	Safina Kauser	221	8.5	−3.6
Majority		1,202	46.3	
Turnout		2,597		
Labour hold				

=== Hopwood Hall ===
Hopwood Hall
Party	Candidate	Votes	%	±%
Labour	Peter Hodgkinson	1,415	64.9	+18.1
Conservative	Claudius Chonzi	408	18.7	−10.5
Middleton Ind.	Matthew Glaysher	257	11.8	−5.5
Liberal Democrats	Iain Donaldson	100	4.6	N/A
Majority		1,007	46.2	
Turnout		2,180		
Labour hold				

=== Kingsway ===
Kingsway
Party	Candidate	Votes	%	±%
Labour	Rachel Massey	1,650	68.6	+12.4
Conservative	Ibrahim Khalil	384	16.0	−7.8
Liberal Democrats	Sharon Taylor	200	8.3	−4.6
Green	Mark Hollinrake	172	7.1	−5.0
Majority		1,266	52.6	
Turnout		2,406		
Labour hold				

=== Littleborough Lakeside ===
Littleborough Lakeside
Party	Candidate	Votes	%	±%
Labour	Richard Jackson	1,103	44.1	+12.6
Conservative	John Hartley	1,096	43.9	+2.0
Green	Guy Otten	239	9.6	−5.8
Liberal Democrats	Zarah Kauser	64	2.6	−12.8
Majority		7	0.2	
Turnout		2,502		
Labour gain from Conservative				

=== Milkstone & Deeplish ===
Milkstone & Deeplish
Party	Candidate	Votes	%	±%
Labour	Aiza Rashid	1,898	80.0	+32.0
Liberal Democrats	Naveed Akhtar	232	9.8	−27.4
Conservative	Raja Miah	148	6.2	+1.8
Green	Feruz Ali	94	4.0	N/A
Majority		1,666	70.2	
Turnout		2,372		
Labour hold				

=== Milnrow & Newhey ===
Milnrow & Newhey
Party	Candidate	Votes	%	±%
Liberal Democrats	Dave Bamford	1,297	47.2	−7.7
Labour	Avis Gilmore	935	34.0	+9.5
Conservative	Aiden Forshaw	349	12.7	−3.4
Green	Stephen Sharp	167	6.1	N/A
Majority		362	13.2	
Turnout		2,748		
Liberal Democrats hold				

=== Norden ===
Norden
Party	Candidate	Votes	%	±%
Conservative	Mike Holly	1,462	53.9	+4.5
Labour	Farhat Kazmi	638	23.5	+2.7
Liberal Democrats	Stephanie Robertson	382	14.1	−4.5
Green	Sarah Croke	229	8.4	N/A
Majority		824	30.4	
Turnout		2,711		
Conservative hold				

=== North Heywood ===
North Heywood
Party	Candidate	Votes	%	±%
Labour	Beverley Place	1,268	78.6	+15.2
Conservative	Nigel Morrell	346	21.4	N/A
Majority		922	57.2	
Turnout		1,614		
Labour hold				

=== North Middleton ===
North Middleton
Party	Candidate	Votes	%	±%
Labour	Elizabeth Atewologun	1,236	50.0	+12.3
Middleton Ind.	Lee Wolf	1,006	40.7	+1.9
Conservative	Darren Bayman	228	9.2	−4.8
Majority		230	9.3	
Turnout		2,470		
Labour gain from Middleton Ind.				

=== Smallbridge & Firgrove ===
Smallbridge & Firgrove
Party	Candidate	Votes	%	±%
Labour	Amna Mir	1,153	51.2	+2.8
Liberal Democrats	Fezan Khalid	606	26.9	−4.1
Conservative	Saliah Begum	294	13.1	−5.1
Freedom Alliance	Paul Ashton	197	8.8	N/A
Majority		547	24.3	
Turnout		2,250		
Labour hold				

=== South Middleton ===
South Middleton
Party	Candidate	Votes	%	±%
Labour	Patricia Dale	1,527	51.8	+9.9
Middleton Ind.	Emma Hezelgrave-Whitworth	937	31.8	+0.6
Conservative	Bernard Braiden	486	16.5	−7.6
Majority		590	20.0	
Turnout		2,950		
Labour hold				

=== Spotland & Falinge ===
Spotland & Falinge
Party	Candidate	Votes	%	±%
Labour	Amber Nisa	1,479	49.3	+0.4
Liberal Democrats	Rabina Asghar	1,143	38.1	+7.5
Conservative	Annmarie Conway	198	6.6	−4.2
Green	Mick Coats	179	6.0	−5.3
Majority		336	11.2	
Turnout		2,999		
Labour hold				

=== Wardle, Shore & West Littleborough ===
Wardle, Shore & West Littleborough
Party	Candidate	Votes	%	±%
Conservative	John Taylor	1,504	59.6	+6.3
Labour	Julian Farnell	689	27.3	+3.9
Green	Hannah MacGuire	186	7.4	−1.7
Liberal Democrats	Eleanor Kelly	146	5.8	−4.1
Majority		815	32.3	
Turnout		2,525		
Conservative hold				

=== West Heywood ===
West Heywood
Party	Candidate	Votes	%	±%
Labour	Linda Robinson	1,184	60.4	+10.5
Conservative	Jordan Tarrant-Short	543	27.7	−6.8
Liberal Democrats	Tom Shaw	232	11.8	N/A
Majority		641	32.7	
Turnout		1,959		
Labour hold				

=== West Middleton ===
West Middleton
Party	Candidate	Votes	%	±%
Labour	Neil Emmott	1,120	60.9	+16.6
Middleton Ind.	Peter Shore	471	25.6	−6.3
Conservative	Matt Roughsedge	157	8.5	−2.7
Liberal Democrats	Nikki Edwards	90	4.9	+0.7
Majority		649	35.3	
Turnout		1,838		
Labour hold				
