= 2022 Rochdale Metropolitan Borough Council election =

2022 local election in Rochdale

← 2021	5 May 2022	2023 →

All 60 seats to Rochdale Metropolitan Borough Council 31 seats needed for a majority

	First party	Second party
Leader	Neil Emmott	Ashley Dearnley
Party	Labour	Conservative
Last election	45 seats, 49.4%	9 seats, 31.5%
Seats before	45	11
Seats won	42	10
Seat change	▼3	▲1
Popular vote	75,197	30,060
Percentage	50.8%	20.3%
Swing	▲1.4%	▼10.2%
	Third party	Fourth party
Leader	Unknown	Andy Kelly
Party	Middleton Ind.	Liberal Democrats
Last election	N/A	3 seats, 12.3%
Seats before	0	3
Seats won	5	3
Seat change	▲5	Steady
Popular vote	13,511	25,569
Percentage	9.1%	17.3%
Swing	N/A	▲5.0%
- Winner of each seat at the 2022 Rochdale Metropolitan Borough Council election
Council control before election
Labour
Council control after election
Labour

The 2022 Rochdale Metropolitan Borough Council election took place as of 5 May 2022. Due to boundary changes, all 60 councillors were elected at the same time. The election took place alongside other local elections across the United Kingdom.

In the previous council election in 2021, Labour maintained its control of the council, holding 45 seats after the election. The Conservatives formed the main opposition with nine seats, with the Liberal Democrats on four councillors and three independent councillors.

== Background ==
Result of the 2021 council election

The Local Government Act 1972 created a two-tier system of metropolitan counties and districts covering Greater Manchester, Merseyside, South Yorkshire, Tyne and Wear, the West Midlands, and West Yorkshire starting in 1974. Rochdale was a district of the Greater Manchester metropolitan county. The Local Government Act 1985 abolished the metropolitan counties, with metropolitan districts taking on most of their powers as metropolitan boroughs. The Greater Manchester Combined Authority was created in 2011 and began electing the mayor of Greater Manchester from 2017, which was given strategic powers covering a region coterminous with the former Greater Manchester metropolitan county.

Since its formation, Rochdale has variously been under Labour control, Liberal Democrat control, Conservative control and no overall control. Councillors have predominantly been elected from the Labour Party, Liberal Democrats and the Conservative Party, with some independent councillors also serving. The council has had an overall Labour majority since the 2011. In the most recent election in 2021, Labour won sixteen seats with 49.4% of the vote, the Conservatives won three seats with 31.5% of the vote and the Liberal Democrats won one with 12.3% of the vote.

Two councillors for the West Heywood ward, Jacqui Beswich and Alan McCarthy, had been originally elected as Labour candidates. They left the Labour Party in 2019 to sit as an independent councillor and a Brexit Party councillor. In June 2021 they both joined the Conservative Party.

Bury council underwent boundary changes ahead of this election. The Local Government Boundary Commission for England determined that the council should continue to elect 60 councillors and designed new election boundaries to reflect population change. The new boundaries include twenty three-member wards.

== Electoral process ==
The council generally elects its councillors in thirds, with a third being up for election every year for three years, with no election in the fourth year. However, due to a boundary review, all sixty councillors were elected at the same time. The election used plurality block voting, with each ward electing three councillors. Electors were able to vote for up to three candidates, and the three candidates with the most votes in each ward were elected.

All registered electors (British, Irish, Commonwealth and European Union citizens) living in Rochdale aged 18 or over were entitled to vote in the election. People who lived at two addresses in different councils, such as university students with different term-time and holiday addresses, were entitled to be registered for and vote in elections in both local authorities. Voting in-person at polling stations took place from 07:00 to 22:00 on election day, and voters were able to apply for postal votes or proxy votes in advance of the election.

== Campaign ==
Bernard Wynne, Peter Shore and Simon Footitt established the Middleton Independents Party to contest the election. They said that Middleton was sidelined in favour of Rochdale, and advocated regenerating the town centre and supporting local businesses. In a meeting, they said that if their candidates meant more Conservatives got elected, it "would not be a bad thing". Their application for electoral registration as a party was submitted after the Electoral Commission's deadline.

== Previous council composition ==
After 2021 election		Before 2022 election	
Party	Seats	Party	Seats
Labour	45	Labour	45
Conservative	9	Conservative	11
Liberal Democrats	3	Liberal Democrats	3
Independent	3	Independent	1

== Results ==
2022 Rochdale Metropolitan Borough Council election
Party	Seats	Gains	Losses	Net gain/loss	Seats %	Votes %	Votes	+/−
Labour	42			▼3	70.00	50.76	75,197	
Conservative	10			▲1	16.67	20.29	30,060	
Middleton Ind.	5			▲5	8.33	9.12	13,511	
Liberal Democrats	3			Steady	5.00	17.26	25,569	
Green	0			Steady	0.00	2.18	3,233	
Independent	0			▼3	0.00	0.29	431	
Freedom Alliance	0			Steady	0.00	0.10	142	

== Ward results ==
=== Balderstone & Kirkholt ===
Balderstone & Kirkholt (3)
Party	Candidate	Votes	%	±%
Labour	Philip Massey	1,225	57.1	
Labour	Daniel Meredith	1,224	57.1	
Labour	Elsie-Jane Wraighte	1,062	49.5	
Conservative	Mudassar Razzaq	505	23.5	
Conservative	Michael Smith	473	22.1	
Green	Jordan Eves	324	15.1	
Liberal Democrats	Judith Jones	313	14.6	
Freedom Alliance	Laura Grabowska	142	6.6	
Turnout		2,145		
Labour win (new seat)				
Labour win (new seat)				
Labour win (new seat)				

=== Bamford ===
Bamford (3)
Party	Candidate	Votes	%	±%
Conservative	Angela Smith	1,683	51.7	
Conservative	Patricia Sullivan	1,553	47.7	
Conservative	Steve Anstee	1,549	47.6	
Labour	Sultan Ali	1,066	32.7	
Labour	Rosie Choudhury	1,066	32.7	
Labour	Brian Meredith	1,014	31.1	
Liberal Democrats	Siobhane Cunnane	406	12.5	
Liberal Democrats	Peter Diestler	380	11.7	
Green	Edward Whittaker	307	9.4	
Liberal Democrats	Zarah Kauser	269	8.3	
Turnout		3,257		
Conservative win (new seat)				
Conservative win (new seat)				
Conservative win (new seat)				

=== Castleton ===
Castleton (3)
Party	Candidate	Votes	%	±%
Labour	Billy Sheerin	1,424	58.2	
Labour	Aisling-Blaise Gallagher	1,214	49.7	
Labour	Aasim Rashid	1,095	44.8	
Conservative	David Jones	664	27.2	
Conservative	Stephen Sanderson	629	25.7	
Conservative	Darren Bayman	584	23.9	
Liberal Democrats	Beverley Heyworth	401	16.4	
Liberal Democrats	Sarah Kisa-Smith	294	12.0	
Liberal Democrats	Sajid Hashmi	236	9.7	
Turnout		2,445		
Labour win (new seat)				
Labour win (new seat)				
Labour win (new seat)				

=== Central Rochdale ===
Central Rochdale (3)
Party	Candidate	Votes	%	±%
Labour	Iftikhar Ahmed	2,598	61.6	
Labour	Ali Ahmed	2,518	59.7	
Labour	Sameena Zaheer	2,193	52.0	
Liberal Democrats	Mohammed Sheraz	1,499	35.6	
Liberal Democrats	Zulfiqar Ali	1,306	31.0	
Liberal Democrats	Zaheer Abbas	1,280	30.4	
Conservative	Leonard Branton	170	4.0	
Conservative	Steven Scholes	159	3.8	
Turnout		4,215		
Labour win (new seat)				
Labour win (new seat)				
Labour win (new seat)				

=== East Middleton ===
East Middleton (3)
Party	Candidate	Votes	%	±%
Middleton Ind.	Paul Beswick	1,300	47.0	
Middleton Ind.	Dylan Williams	1,257	45.5	
Middleton Ind.	Bernard Wynne	1,245	45.0	
Labour	Kathryn Bromfield	1,193	43.2	
Labour	Elizabeth Atewologun	1,189	43.0	
Labour	Terry Smith	1,166	42.2	
Green	Connor Hibbert	269	9.7	
Turnout		2,764		
Middleton Ind. win (new seat)				
Middleton Ind. win (new seat)				
Middleton Ind. win (new seat)				

=== Healey ===
Healey (3)
Party	Candidate	Votes	%	±%
Labour	Sean O'Neill	1,582	52.6	
Labour	Shah Wazir	1,562	52.0	
Labour	Tricia Ayrton	1,533	51.0	
Conservative	Andrew Neilson	962	32.0	
Liberal Democrats	Mark Alcock	563	18.7	
Liberal Democrats	Shin Ingram	446	14.8	
Liberal Democrats	Safina Kauser	365	12.1	
Turnout		3,006		
Labour win (new seat)				
Labour win (new seat)				
Labour win (new seat)				

=== Hopwood Hall ===
Hopwood Hall (3)
Party	Candidate	Votes	%	±%
Labour	Susan Emmott	1,304	50.5	
Labour	Carol Wardle	1,226	47.5	
Labour	Peter Hodgkinson	1,209	46.8	
Conservative	Jacqueline Beswick	755	29.2	
Conservative	Alan McCarthy	674	26.1	
Conservative	Matthew Roughsedge	669	25.9	
Middleton Ind.	Matthew Glaysher	447	17.3	
Middleton Ind.	Caitlin O'Mara	433	16.8	
Middleton Ind.	Gavin Vitler	424	16.4	
Turnout		2,582		
Labour win (new seat)				
Labour win (new seat)				
Labour win (new seat)				

=== Kingsway ===
Kingsway (3)
Party	Candidate	Votes	%	±%
Labour	Shakil Ahmed	1,737	63.0	
Labour	Daalat Ali	1,584	57.5	
Labour	Rachel Massey	1,548	56.2	
Conservative	Ibrahim Khalil	655	23.8	
Liberal Democrats	Sharon Taylor	355	12.9	
Green	Mark Hollinrake	333	12.1	
Liberal Democrats	Barrie Nicholson	251	9.1	
Liberal Democrats	Chariss Peacock	197	7.2	
Turnout		2,755		
Labour win (new seat)				
Labour win (new seat)				
Labour win (new seat)				

=== Littleborough Lakeside ===
Littleborough Lakeside (3)
Party	Candidate	Votes	%	±%
Labour	Janet Emsley	1,349	47.8	
Labour	Tom Besford	1,287	45.6	
Conservative	Peter Reed	1,185	41.9	
Conservative	Lynn Butterworth	1,083	38.3	
Conservative	Daniel Nuttall	931	33.0	
Labour	Julian Farnell	889	31.5	
Liberal Democrats	Kate Clegg	434	15.4	
Green	Guy Otten	434	15.4	
Turnout		2,825		
Labour win (new seat)				
Labour win (new seat)				
Conservative win (new seat)				

=== Milkstone & Deeplish ===
Milkstone & Deeplish (3)
Party	Candidate	Votes	%	±%
Labour	Mohammad Arshad	1,726	53.9	
Labour	Shahid Mohammed	1,642	51.2	
Labour	Aiza Rashid	1,539	48.0	
Liberal Democrats	Mohammed Zaman	1,192	37.2	
Liberal Democrats	Salina Javid	1,182	36.9	
Liberal Democrats	Hassan Ali	1,107	34.6	
Conservative	Paul Ellison	141	4.4	
Conservative	Jacqueline Holt	131	4.1	
Turnout		3,204		
Labour win (new seat)				
Labour win (new seat)				
Labour win (new seat)				

=== Milnrow & Newhey ===
Milnrow & Newhey (3)
Party	Candidate	Votes	%	±%
Liberal Democrats	Irene Davidson	1,942	64.2	
Liberal Democrats	Andy Kelly	1,903	62.9	
Liberal Democrats	David Bamford	1,660	54.9	
Labour	Allen Brett	741	24.5	
Labour	Leanne Greenwood	583	19.3	
Labour	Alexander Royle	509	16.8	
Conservative	Steve Endacott	487	16.1	
Turnout		3,025		
Liberal Democrats win (new seat)				
Liberal Democrats win (new seat)				
Liberal Democrats win (new seat)				

=== Norden ===
Norden (3)
Party	Candidate	Votes	%	±%
Conservative	James Gartside	1,704	55.7	
Conservative	Peter Winkler	1,579	51.6	
Conservative	Mike Holly	1,511	49.4	
Labour	Tony Bennett	913	29.8	
Labour	Iain MacDonald	840	27.5	
Labour	Farhat Kazmi	637	20.8	
Liberal Democrats	Stephanie Robertson	568	18.6	
Liberal Democrats	Anne Colgan	482	15.8	
Liberal Democrats	Colette Duszczyk	433	14.2	
Turnout		3,059		
Conservative win (new seat)				
Conservative win (new seat)				
Conservative win (new seat)				

=== North Heywood ===
North Heywood (3)
Party	Candidate	Votes	%	±%
Labour	Liam O'Rourke	1,205	68.1	
Labour	Peter Rush	1,166	65.9	
Labour	Bev Place	1,121	63.4	
Liberal Democrats	Jennifer Kelly	368	20.8	
Liberal Democrats	Iain Donaldson	325	18.4	
Liberal Democrats	Richard Eden-Maughan	280	15.8	
Turnout		1,769		
Labour win (new seat)				
Labour win (new seat)				
Labour win (new seat)				

=== North Middleton ===
North Middleton (3)
Party	Candidate	Votes	%	±%
Middleton Ind.	Peter Allonby	1,140	41.7	
Labour	Sara Rowbotham	1,118	40.9	
Middleton Ind.	Lee Wolf	1,059	38.8	
Middleton Ind.	Keely O'Mara	1,059	38.8	
Labour	Donna Williams	1,029	37.7	
Labour	Neil Butterworth	886	32.4	
Conservative	David Bold	381	14.0	
Green	Alan Godson	282	10.3	
Turnout		2,731		
Middleton Ind. win (new seat)				
Labour win (new seat)				
Middleton Ind. win (new seat)				

=== Smallbridge & Firgrove ===
Smallbridge & Firgrove (3)
Party	Candidate	Votes	%	±%
Labour	Aftab Hussain	1,343	51.3	
Labour	John Blundell	1,312	50.1	
Labour	Amna Mir	1,269	48.4	
Liberal Democrats	Latafat Hussain	812	31.0	
Liberal Democrats	Eleanor Kelly	798	30.5	
Liberal Democrats	Dean Larder	695	26.5	
Conservative	Eileen Taylor	476	18.2	
Turnout		2,620		
Labour win (new seat)				
Labour win (new seat)				
Labour win (new seat)				

=== South Middleton ===
South Middleton (3)
Party	Candidate	Votes	%	±%
Labour	Peter Williams	1,540	45.9	
Labour	June West	1,473	43.9	
Labour	Patricia Dale	1,404	41.9	
Middleton Ind.	Adam Cornett	1,350	40.3	
Middleton Ind.	Emma Hezelgrave-Whitworth	1,046	31.2	
Middleton Ind.	Jo Hezelgrave-Whitworth	959	28.6	
Conservative	Bernard Braiden	809	24.1	
Conservative	Aaron Slack	567	16.9	
Turnout		3,354		
Labour win (new seat)				
Labour win (new seat)				
Labour win (new seat)				

=== Spotland & Falinge ===
Spotland & Falinge (3)
Party	Candidate	Votes	%	±%
Labour	Iram Faisal	1,832	53.3	
Labour	Faisal Rana	1,815	52.8	
Labour	Amber Nisa	1,681	48.9	
Liberal Democrats	Rabina Asghar	1,053	30.6	
Liberal Democrats	John Swarbrick	743	21.6	
Liberal Democrats	Hammas Majid	678	19.7	
Independent	Carl Faulkner	431	12.5	
Green	Mick Coats	388	11.3	
Conservative	John Kershaw	372	10.8	
Green	Neil Rutter	269	7.8	
Turnout		3,436		
Labour win (new seat)				
Labour win (new seat)				
Labour win (new seat)				

=== Wardle, Shore & West Littleborough ===
Wardle, Shore & West Littleborough (3)
Party	Candidate	Votes	%	±%
Conservative	Ashley Dearnley	1,881	67.6	
Conservative	Rina Paolucci	1,493	53.7	
Conservative	John Taylor	1,482	53.3	
Labour	Barbara Miller	652	23.4	
Labour	Mike Radanovic	564	20.3	
Labour	Muhammad Islam	454	16.3	
Green	Jules Howliston	375	13.5	
Liberal Democrats	Vickie Mason	275	9.9	
Green	Hannah MacGuire	252	9.1	
Turnout		2,781		
Conservative win (new seat)				
Conservative win (new seat)				
Conservative win (new seat)				

=== West Heywood ===
West Heywood (3)
Party	Candidate	Votes	%	±%
Labour	Angela Brown	1,241	60.7	
Labour	Peter Malcolm	1,102	53.9	
Labour	Linda Robinson	1,021	49.9	
Conservative	Christopher Harris	706	34.5	
Conservative	Ian Kilgannon	630	30.8	
Conservative	Martin Orson	621	30.4	
Turnout		2,046		
Labour win (new seat)				
Labour win (new seat)				
Labour win (new seat)				

=== West Middleton ===
West Middleton (3)
Party	Candidate	Votes	%	±%
Labour	Philip Burke	1,029	55.9	
Labour	Susan Smith	937	50.9	
Labour	Neil Emmott	816	44.3	
Middleton Ind.	Joan Aspinall	656	35.6	
Middleton Ind.	Peter Shore	587	31.9	
Middleton Ind.	Simon Footitt	549	29.8	
Conservative	Jordan Short	206	11.2	
Liberal Democrats	Nikki Edwards	78	4.2	
Turnout		1,841		
Labour win (new seat)				
Labour win (new seat)				
Labour win (new seat)				
