= Kimberley School =

The Kimberley School
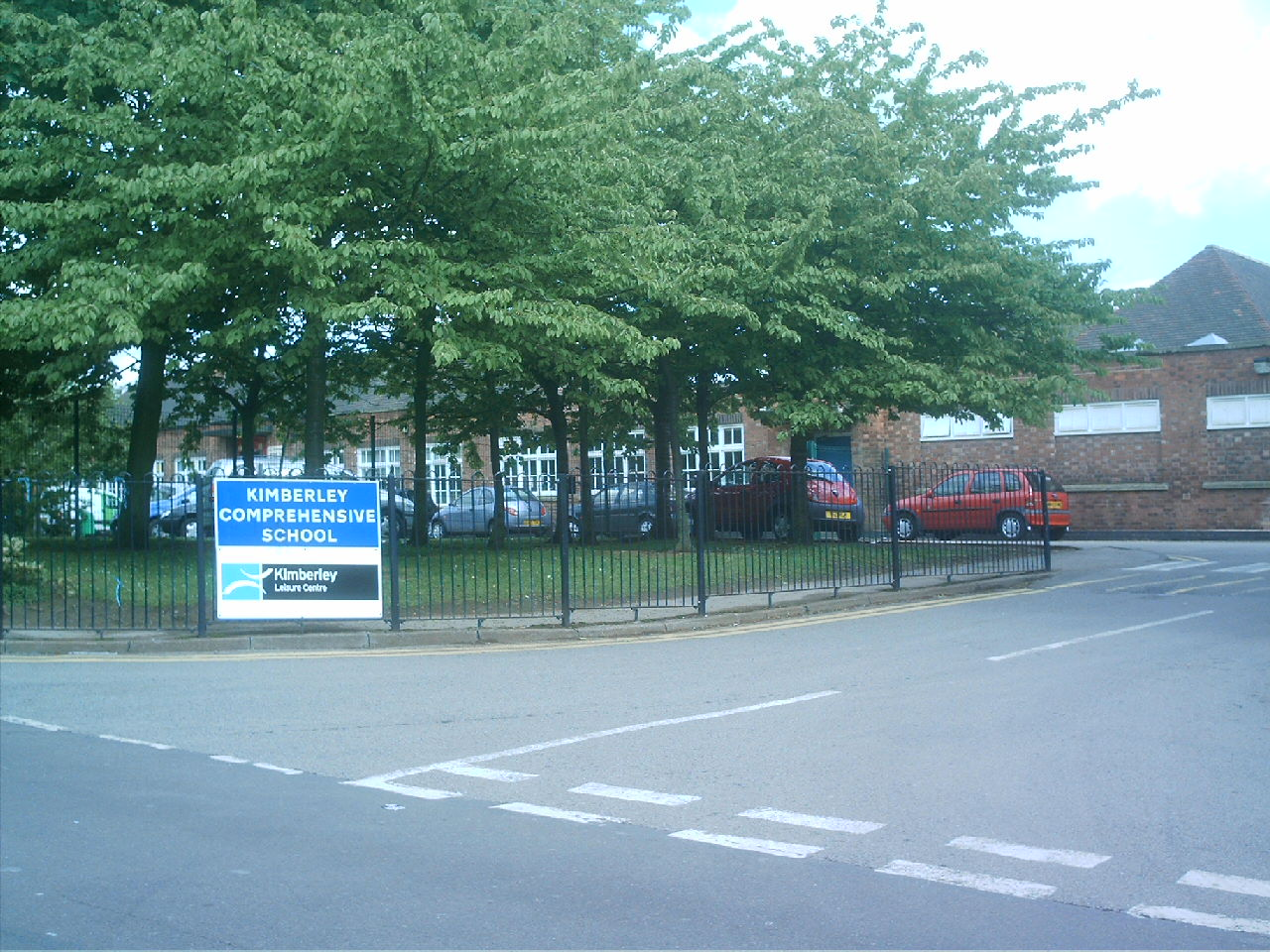
- in 2007

Location
- Newdigate Street; Kimberley, Nottinghamshire, NG16 2NJ; England
- Coordinates: 52°59′57″N 1°15′06″W

Information
- Former name: Kimberley Comprehensive School
- Type: Academy
- Established: 1946
- Trust: East Midlands Education Trust
- Department for Education URN: 138641 Tables
- Ofsted: Reports
- Chair of Governors: Nicole Clarke
- Headteacher: Andy Park
- Staff: 85
- Gender: Coeducational
- Age: 11 to 18
- Enrolment: 1328
- Capacity: 1375
- Houses: Boot, Clough, Lawrence, Nightingale
- Website: http://www.kimberleyschool.co.uk/

The Kimberley School, formerly Kimberley Comprehensive School, is a secondary school in Kimberley, Nottinghamshire, England. It has academy status. Part of the East Midlands Education Trust, it has many feeder schools in the Kimberley/Nuthall area. It opened a new multi-million pound sixth form centre in September 2020.

== Family of schools ==
Kimberley's school family is Awsworth Primary, Gilthill Primary, Hollywell Primary, Horsendale Primary, Kimberley Primary, Larkfields Junior, Larkfields Infant and Mornington Primary. Details of the admission rules to the school and its sixth form are published. The school has capacity for 1375 pupils.

== Notable staff ==
- Paul Rowen M.P. taught science here from 1977-80
