= Simon Danczuk =

British politician (born 1966)

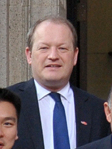
- Danczuk in 2013

Member of Parliament for Rochdale
- In office 6 May 2010 – 3 May 2017
- Preceded by: Paul Rowen
- Succeeded by: Tony Lloyd

Personal details
- Born: Simon Christopher Danczuk; 24 October 1966 (age 59) Hapton, Lancashire, England
- Party: Reform UK (2023–present)
- Other political affiliations: Labour (before 2017); Independent (2015–2023)
- Spouse: Karen Burke (m. 2012; sep. 2015) Claudine Uwamahoro (m. 2023)
- Education: Lancaster University
- Occupation: Author; politician

Simon Christopher Danczuk (/ˈdæntʃək/ DAN-chək; born 24 October 1966) is a British author and former politician, who was Member of Parliament (MP) for Rochdale between 2010 and 2017. Elected as a member of the Labour Party, he was suspended from the party in 2015 after it emerged he had exchanged explicit messages with a 17-year-old girl. He has co-written two books, Smile for the Camera: The Double Life of Cyril Smith (2014) and Scandal at Dolphin Square (2022). Danczuk was the unsuccessful Reform UK candidate at the 2024 Rochdale by-election, which was won by Workers Party of Britain leader George Galloway.

== Career ==
He began his working life at the age of sixteen in a factory making gas fires, before moving to the chemical company ICI. Whilst working, he studied at night school and gained qualifications he had missed at secondary school. He then gained a place as a mature student at Lancaster University, where he studied Economics, Politics and Sociology.

Danczuk became involved in the Labour movement after joining the Labour Party through the GMB trade union in the late 1980s. In 1993, at the age of 27, he was elected as a councillor to Blackburn with Darwen Borough Council and served for six years, with portfolios including economic development and education.

In 1999, Danczuk became the founding director of a research, public affairs and communications consultancy called Vision Twentyone alongside Ruth Turner, who would later become Director of Government Relations within Tony Blair's Downing Street office. Danczuk held this position until his election to Parliament in 2010. He also has held research positions at The Big Issue in the North, Opinion Research Corporation, Bolton Bury TEC and worked for academics at Lancaster University.

Danczuk founded the Necessary Group, a campaign group of businessmen and politicians which campaigned prior to the expected referendums for an elected Regional Assembly for the North West of England.

Danczuk was selected in early 2007 to be the Rochdale Labour Party's Prospective Parliamentary Candidate. He received death threats during the selection process, including a funeral wreath with flowers spelling 'Simon' and a four-foot cross being anonymously sent to his work office.

== Parliamentary career ==
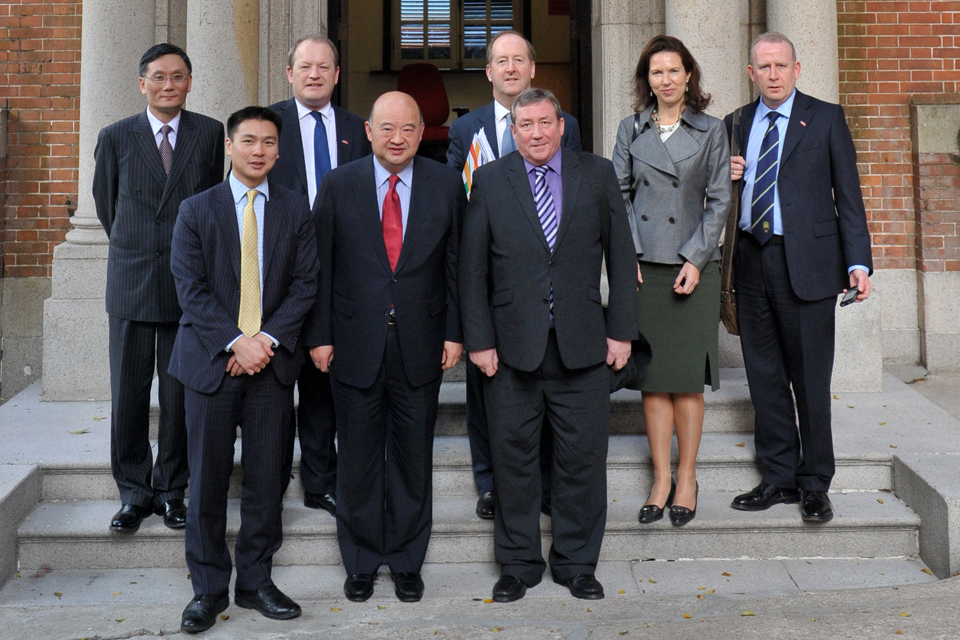
Danczuk (back row, second from left), in 2013, on a parliamentary visit to Hong Kong

Danczuk was first elected to Parliament in the 2010 general election. He unseated incumbent Liberal Democrat Paul Rowen and secured a majority of 889 votes. Danczuk won the seat for Labour despite a microphone picking up Prime Minister Gordon Brown calling Rochdale resident Gillian Duffy a "bigoted woman" on a visit to the constituency during the campaign.

In May 2011, Danczuk made a criminal complaint to Essex Police about Liberal Democrat MP and Secretary of State for Energy and Climate Change, Chris Huhne, after it was alleged that Huhne had asked his wife, economist Vicky Pryce, to take his penalty points for a speeding offence in 2003. On 3 February 2012, Huhne became the first Cabinet Minister in British political history to be forced from office as a result of criminal proceedings. Huhne was later tried and imprisoned, as was Vicky Pryce.

Danczuk was known as a "long time critic" of Ed Miliband's leadership of the party by the end of 2014, when he was alleged to be considering defection to UKIP due to his disagreement with Labour's stance on immigration and his positive appraisal of the 2013–2014 electoral successes of Nigel Farage's party.

Danczuk was re-elected as the Labour MP for Rochdale at the 2015 general election, substantially increasing his majority from 889 to 12,442 over the second-placed UKIP candidate.

Danczuk was critical of Jeremy Corbyn's leadership of the party following his election as leader on 12 September 2015. The Financial Times described him as Corbyn's "most outspoken internal critic".

Danczuk was particularly active investigating historical allegations of child abuse against politicians. His campaigning attracted significant media attention and as a result he was one of the most high-profile backbench MPs. In March 2014 Smile for the Camera: The Double Life of Cyril Smith was published, an exposé of child sexual abuse committed by former Rochdale MP Cyril Smith, written by Danczuk along with researcher and campaigner Matthew Baker. The book was serialised in the Daily Mail, and was named Political Book of the Year for 2014 by the Sunday Times.

=== 2016 IPSA investigation into expenses ===
In February 2016, the Independent Parliamentary Standards Authority (IPSA) conducted an investigation into expenses claimed by Danczuk, following several newspaper investigations and a complaint from the member of the public. The report, published on 18 March 2016 concluded that Danczuk had claimed residency expenses for his two oldest children over a period of 3 years, which was required to be repaid—a total of £11,583.20 as well as £96.50 claimed for car parking charges, which had been claimed while he was on holiday in Spain.

The report's conclusion stated: "The evidence points overwhelmingly to the conclusion that the MP obtained an increase to his Accommodation Expenditure budget by claiming dependant uplifts for his two oldest children for a period of over three years, when, at no point were either of the children routinely resident. The Compliance Officer must also conclude that this was done knowing that there was no reasonable prospect of the children staying at the accommodation."

Danczuk agreed to repay the £11,583.20 stating that he "I readily admit I did not read the rules. I relied on a member of staff to describe the rules to me at the time". In a later separate statement, Danczuk referred to the rules as "vaguely worded" and admitted error on his part, stating he would repay the money at the earliest available opportunity.

Following the report, the Metropolitan Police reported Danczuk referred the case to the Crown Prosecution Service for criminal charges however the criminal case was dropped due to insufficient evidence.

In July 2016, Danczuk was then later alleged by The Guardian newspaper to have claimed £500 to pay for a "crisis management" consultant's services over two days, three days after he was suspended from the Labour Party for his exchanging of sexually-explicit messages with then-17-year-old girl who had reached out to Danczuk's office seeking a career in politics.

=== Independent Inquiry into Child Sexual Abuse (IICSA) ===
During a Home Affairs Select Committee hearing in July 2014, Danczuk called for Leon Brittan, Home Secretary between 1983 and 1985, to make public what he knew about a dossier of allegations against politicians presented to him by Geoffrey Dickens (1931 – 1995, MP until 1995), which could identify several historic child sex abusers. The Home Office stated that the dossier had not been retained in their files. Former Director of Public Prosecutions Lord Macdonald said the circumstances in which the dossier had gone missing were alarming, and recommended an inquiry into what happened.

Prime Minister David Cameron subsequently asked the Home Office Permanent Secretary to investigate what happened to the missing dossier. The same month, Danczuk wrote to the Director of Public Prosecutions asking for a review of the decision not to investigate certain historical allegations of sexual abuse made against senior Westminster politicians.

Danczuk's investigation significantly contributed to the decision of the government to set up the Independent Inquiry into Child Sexual Abuse, a statutory inquiry under the Inquiries Act 2005, which opened on 9 July 2015. During the investigation, it was revealed that former Liberal Party leader David Steel learned about Cyril Smith's behaviour in 1979, but did nothing about it, and later nominated him for a knighthood. As a result, on 25 February 2020, he resigned from the Liberal Democrats and resigned from the House of Lords on 27 March 2020.

For his investigative work on child abuse, Danczuk was named Campaigner of the Year by the Political Studies Association in November 2014, and won the Contrarian Prize in June 2015.

== Suspension by the Labour Party and resignation ==
In December 2015, Danczuk's membership of the Labour Party was suspended, following reports he had exchanged explicit messages with a 17-year-old girl. Danczuk apologised for his behaviour, which he described as "inappropriate and stupid", and said the incident occurred during an extremely low point of his life after his second marriage had collapsed. Danczuk was not found to have broken the law and was not expelled from the party, but the National Executive Committee of the Labour Party ruled that he would not be endorsed as a Labour Party candidate for the snap 2017 United Kingdom general election. He resigned from the party in May 2017 and contested Rochdale as an independent candidate, finishing in fifth place. Labour candidate Tony Lloyd won the seat. After the result, he said that he would not stand for election again.

On the day he was nominated for the Rochdale election, he was accused of rape in the Westminster area of London, resulting in him receiving abuse online and on the streets. The Metropolitan Police confirmed they were taking no further action shortly before the election, with him believing the accusation was an attempt to "sabotage" his campaign.

== Subsequent career ==
In February 2024, Danczuk announced that he had joined Reform UK three months prior, and would be the party's candidate for the 2024 Rochdale by-election. Danczuk came sixth, and saved his deposit, gaining 6.3 per cent of the votes cast. His party alleged that the election was rigged, also claiming that Danczuk was threatened and subjected to "menacing behaviour". No further evidence was presented for the claim of rigging.

One individual was taken into custody, after posting a video online referencing Danczuk's leaflet, which stated "vote for Rochdale, not Gaza", and saying that Danczuk resembled the EastEnders TV character Phil Mitchell, before threatening Danczuk. The individual was later arrested.

== Personal life ==
Danczuk has been married three times; his first two marriages ended in divorce, and he has two children each with his first and second wives.

Danczuk married Karen Burke in 2012. They have two sons. The couple separated in June 2015. In July 2015, he said that he had been suffering from depression caused by his campaigning work on child sexual abuse and that this had affected their marriage.

In 2022, he became engaged to Claudine "Coco" Uwamahoro, a Rwandan beauty therapist whom he met on a business trip to Rwanda in March 2022, and they married in July 2023.

== Bibliography ==
- Danczuk, Simon and Baker, Matthew (2014). Smile for the Camera: The Double Life of Cyril Smith. Biteback Publishing. ISBN 978-1-849546-44-7. Extract
- Danczuk, Simon and Smith, Daniel (2022). Scandal at Dolphin Square. The History Press Ltd. ISBN 9780750997140.

Parliament of the United Kingdom
Preceded by Paul Rowen	Member of Parliament for Rochdale; 2010–2017	Succeeded by Tony Lloyd
