= Peter Roberts (councillor) =

Peter Roberts is a former British councillor who was Leader of Rochdale Borough Council from 1997-2006.

== Career ==
=== Rochdale Borough Council ===
He became (Labour) Deputy Leader of the council in 1996, then Leader in 1997. Labour lost control of the council in 2003. In the 2006 elections, the Lib Dems took over the council, and Alan Taylor became Leader of the council; Alan Taylor, Leader from 2006–10, died aged 75 in May 2019.

== Personal life ==
He lives just north of Rochdale Infirmary. He is married to Gill

Civic offices
Preceded by	Leader of Rochdale Metropolitan Borough Council; 1997 – June 2006	Succeeded by Alan Taylor
Preceded by	Deputy Leader of Rochdale Metropolitan Borough Council; 1996 – 1997	Succeeded by
