= 2024 Rochdale by-election =

UK parliamentary by-election

- 29 February 2024

Rochdale constituency
- Registered: 78,801
- Turnout: 39.7% (▼20.4 pp)
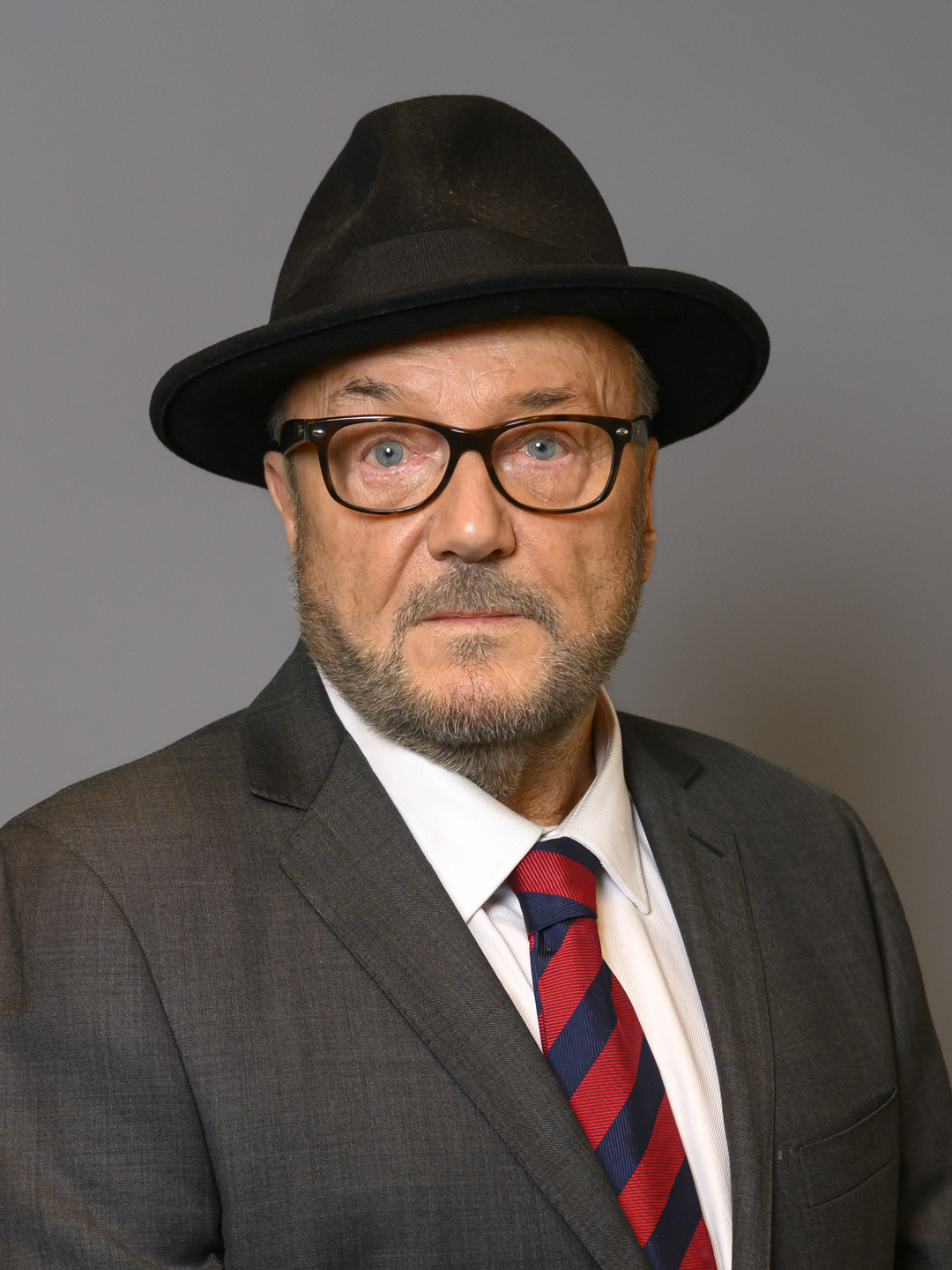

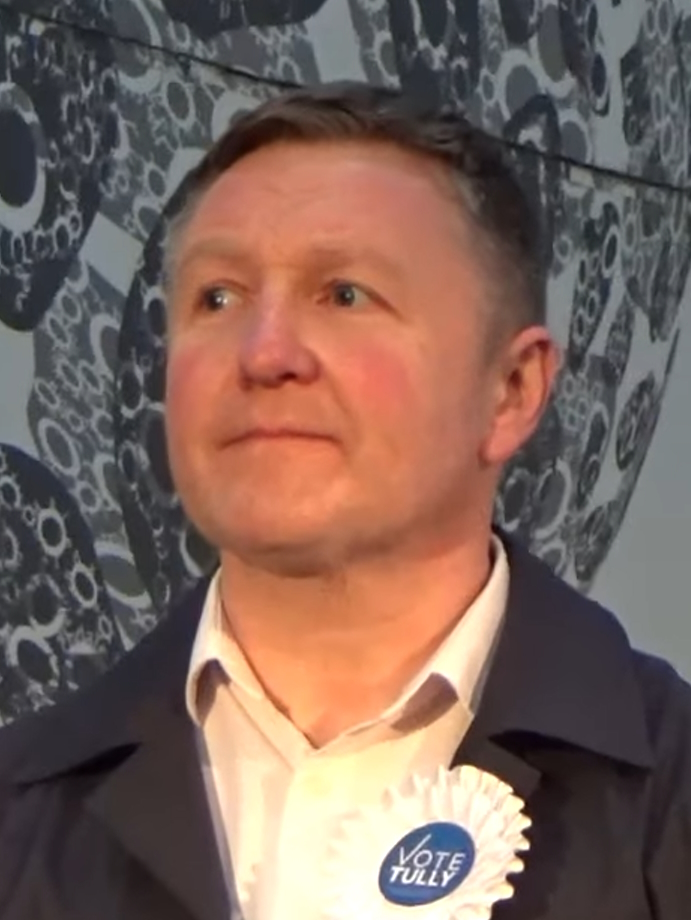

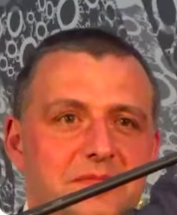

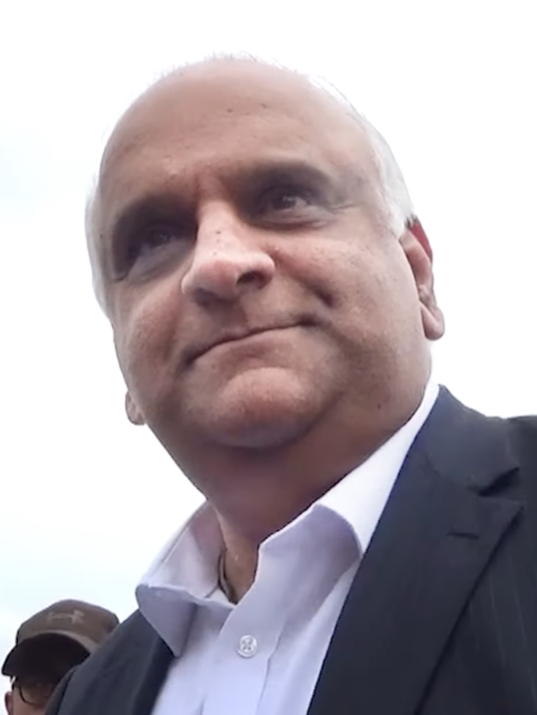

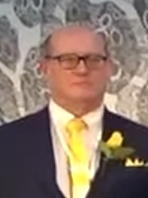

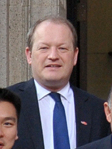
	First party	Second party	Third party
Candidate	George Galloway	David Tully	Paul Ellison
Party	Workers Party	Independent	Conservative
Popular vote	12,335	6,638	3,731
Percentage	39.7%	21.3%	12.0%
Swing	New	New	▼19.2 pp
	Fourth party	Fifth party	Sixth party
Candidate	Azhar Ali	Iain Donaldson	Simon Danczuk
Party	Labour (Note: Ali was suspended from the Labour Party on 12 February 2024, after nominations closed (2 February), so he was still identified as the Labour Party candidate on the ballot paper.)	Liberal Democrats	Reform
Popular vote	2,402	2,164	1,968
Percentage	7.7%	7.0%	6.3%
Swing	▼43.9 pp	pp	▼1.9 pp
- Boundary of Rochdale in Greater Manchester
MP before election
Tony Lloyd
Labour
Elected MP
George Galloway
Workers

A by-election for the United Kingdom parliamentary constituency of Rochdale was held on 29 February 2024, following the death of incumbent Labour MP Sir Tony Lloyd. It was won by George Galloway of the Workers Party of Britain, who received 40% of the vote and overturned a 9,668 vote Labour majority from the 2019 general election.

== Constituency ==
Rochdale is a constituency in the North West region of England, located in the east of Greater Manchester. The constituency is based on the town of the same name.

Following the 1997 general election, Rochdale was considered a Labour–Liberal Democrat marginal. This changed when the UK Independence Party finished second in the 2015 general election. In the 2016 European Union membership referendum, Rochdale voted 3:2 in favour of Brexit.

The constituency has above average unemployment and many people living in poverty. British Asians make up 18.5% of the population. Since 1997, the constituency has also included the semi-rural suburb of Littleborough, one of the relatively prosperous areas of the borough. A by-election last took place in this area in 1995, in the former Littleborough and Saddleworth constituency. The Liberal Democrats won the by-election, though Labour won both successor constituencies (the other being Oldham East and Saddleworth) at the 1997 general election. At the 2019 general election, there was a 60.1% turnout with an electorate of 78,909. Following the 2023 review of Westminster constituencies, the composition of the constituency was subject to minor boundary changes at the 2024 general election to bring the electorate within the permitted range, with the Spotland and Falinge ward being transferred to the new constituency of Heywood and Middleton North.

== Background ==
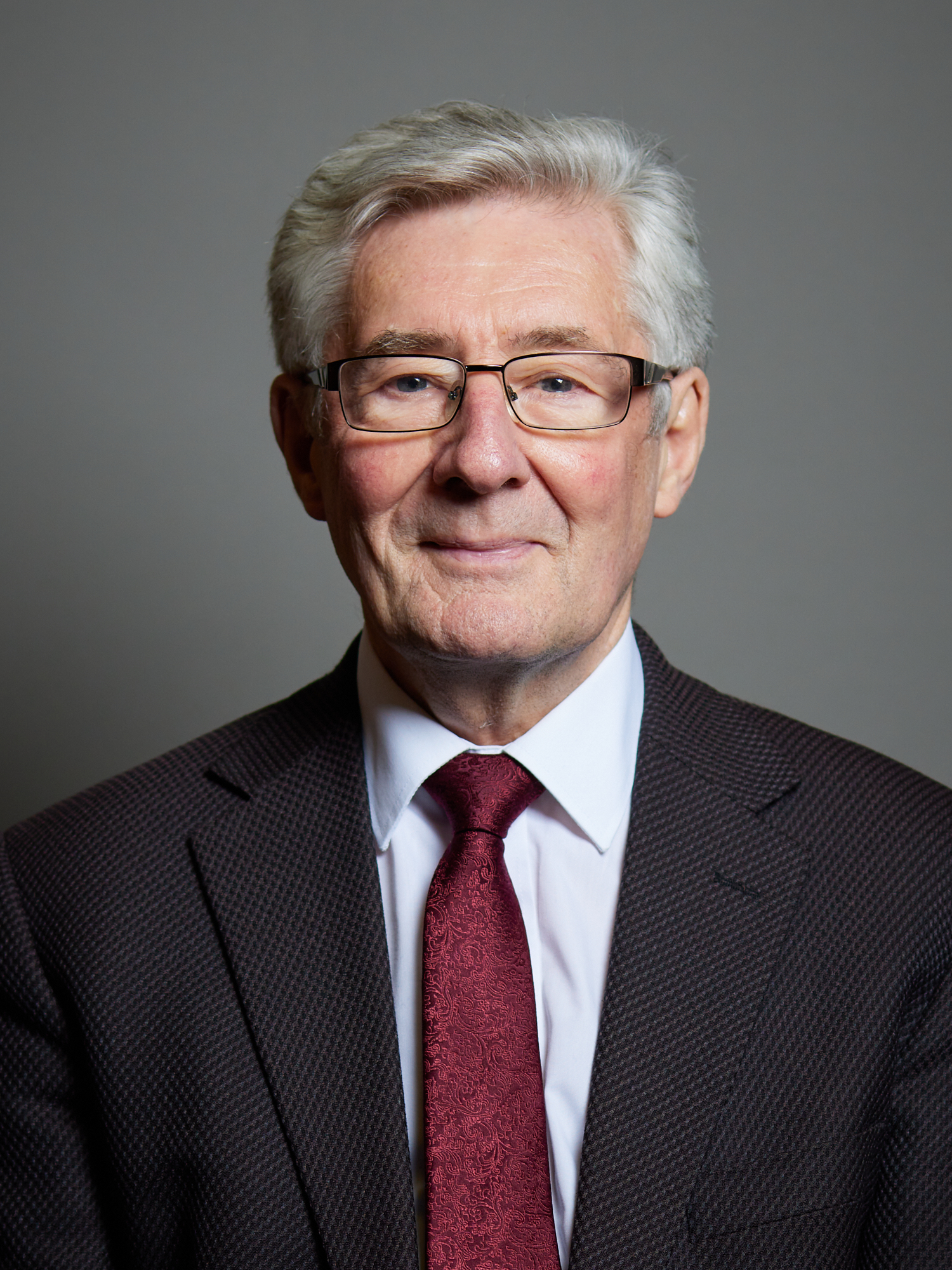
Sir Tony Lloyd served as the MP for Rochdale from 2017 until his death in 2024.

Tony Lloyd was elected Member of Parliament (MP) for the constituency in the 2017 general election, and was re-elected in the 2019 general election. He had previously been a Labour MP between 1983 and 2012, Greater Manchester Police and Crime Commissioner, the interim Mayor of Greater Manchester from 2015 to 2017, and Minister of State for Foreign Affairs under Prime Minister Tony Blair from 1997 to 1999.

Shortly after his election as MP for Rochdale, Lloyd returned to frontbench politics as Shadow Housing Minister in the Shadow Cabinet of Jeremy Corbyn from 2017 to 2018. He was promoted to Shadow Secretary of State for Northern Ireland in 2018 and became Shadow Secretary of State for Scotland in 2019. He was replaced as Shadow Scotland Secretary in the Shadow Cabinet of Keir Starmer but continued as Shadow Northern Ireland Secretary. He resigned from the frontbench in 2020 to recover from COVID-19.

In January 2023, Lloyd announced that he was undergoing chemotherapy after a diagnosis for cancer, and subsequently did not attend parliament or face-to-face functions under medical advice. On 11 January 2024, he stated that he had an untreatable form of leukaemia and had decided to end hospital treatment to spend his remaining time with his family. His family announced that he had "died peacefully" at home in the morning of 17 January.

On 29 January 2024, the writ was moved in the House of Commons, with the by-election due to take place on 29 February 2024.

== Candidates and campaign ==
Azhar Ali, who had been a candidate for the Westminster seat of Pendle in 2015 and 2019, was selected as the Labour Party candidate on 27 January 2024. He was a Lancashire county councillor and was, at the time of his selection, the leader of the Labour group on the council. He was selected from a shortlist of three, including Westminster lobby journalist Paul Waugh, and Nazia Rehman, a member of Wigan Metropolitan Borough Council and cabinet member. During the campaign, the Daily Mail obtained a recording of a meeting at which Ali suggested that Israel had allowed the October 7 attacks to go ahead, in order to "green light" an invasion of Gaza. Upon the publication of the recording, Ali retracted his comments and apologised. Following information about other comments made by Ali, Labour withdrew its support on 12 February, and the party announced it would no longer devote resources to his campaign. Prior to the withdrawal, Ali had received abuse for Labour's position on Israel, despite his own support for Palestine.

Simon Danczuk was selected as the candidate for Reform UK. Danczuk was the Labour MP for Rochdale from 2010 until 2015, when he was suspended from the party after it emerged he had exchanged explicit messages with a 17-year-old girl. He then sat as an independent until the 2017 election, when he ran for re-election as an independent, but finished in fifth place with 1.8 per cent, losing his deposit. Despite the right-wing orientation of Reform UK, Danczuk campaigned as an "old Labour" candidate with a focus on local issues, rather than what he describes as the "woke" politics of the Labour Party, or the Israel-Palestine conflict. According to Reform UK leader Richard Tice, Danczuk and Reform were the subject of violent threats during the campaign, including a threat to firebomb businesses whose owners campaigned for Reform. One man was arrested for malicious communication for threatening Danczuk.

Iain Donaldson was selected as the Liberal Democrat candidate; he was also the party's candidate for the nearby constituency of Blackley and Middleton South at the 2024 general election. He stated that his intention would be to hold the government to account over the NHS, cost of living crisis, and tolerance of water pollution. He received the endorsement of Paul Rowen, the constituency's most recent Liberal Democrat MP. Donaldson was a councillor in Manchester for 19 years, and worked as an administrator at the University of Manchester.

The Conservative Party candidate was Paul Ellison, the owner of a local landscaping firm. He was named "Man of Rochdale" in 2019 for his involvement with the Royal Horticultural Society's In Bloom campaign. His focus was on improving the town centre, reducing antisocial behaviours, and protecting greenery in Rochdale. He expressed concern over Rochdale's negative image.

Former Labour and Respect Party MP George Galloway contested the seat for the Workers Party of Britain. He focused his campaign on support for Gaza. The Labour candidate, Azhar Ali, said Galloway's campaign focused on Muslim voters in Rochdale. Freelance writer and socialist activist Michael Chessum wrote that Galloway's campaign sent out more than one letter to constituents during the campaign. One addressed issues most salient to Muslim voters, in particular focusing on the war in Gaza and using Arabic phrases such as "As-salamu alaykum" and "ummah", while the other highlighted "Galloway's record of backing Brexit, opposing Scottish independence and supporting family values". On 19 February, a Liberal Democrat candidate for the 2024 Rochdale Metropolitan Borough Council election was suspended by the party after being photographed campaigning with Galloway. Galloway was endorsed by former BNP leader Nick Griffin, which Galloway rejected, describing it as "unwelcome".

Guy Otten, a retired solicitor and tribunal judge, was selected as the Green Party candidate. On 7 February, after derogatory social media posts on Gaza and the Muslim faith he had made between 2013 and 2015 came to light, the party announced that they were no longer endorsing his candidacy. Otten subsequently said that he had "decided to leave the stage", and would not campaign in the election.

There were four independent candidates. The most successful was David Tully (b. 1974), owner of a local vehicle repair shop, who campaigned on various local issues, including the reinstatement of a local maternity ward, and support for local sports teams Rochdale AFC and Rochdale Hornets. He began his independent campaign four weeks before the election and received 6,638 votes, more than the Conservatives and Labour combined.

Another independent candidate was Michael Howarth, a local businessman who owned a number of bars in Rochdale and campaigned on local issues and support for additional NHS funding. William Howarth campaigned on issues related to the Rochdale child sex abuse ring and child sexual abuse at large, having previously founded the organisation Parents Against Grooming. Mark Coleman, a climate change activist and former vicar of Rochdale, campaigned for "radical action on climate". He was jailed in April 2023 for his part in a Just Stop Oil protest in Bishopsgate, London. Despite running as an independent, he had the support of two local Labour Party officers. He formerly ran as a Green Party candidate for council elections in Liverpool. The BBC reported that Green Party activists had been campaigning for Coleman, since their own candidate, Guy Otten, dropped out of the contest.

The Official Monster Raving Loony Party candidate was Ravin Rodent Subortna, who campaigned for the introduction of a 99p coin and the eradication of homelessness amongst hedgehogs.

== Result ==
The result marked the first by-election in Great Britain since the 1945 Combined Scottish Universities by-election at which neither of the two best-performing candidates were from the Conservative Party, Labour, or Liberal Democrats. 167 ballots were rejected, equivalent to a 0.5% share of the total votes cast.

Bar chart of the election result.

2024 Rochdale by-election
Party	Candidate	Votes	%	±%
Workers Party	George Galloway	12,335	39.7	N/A
Independent	David Tully	6,638	21.3	N/A
Conservative	Paul Ellison	3,731	12.0	–19.2
Labour	Azhar Ali	2,402	7.7	–43.9
Liberal Democrats	Iain Donaldson	2,164	7.0	±0.0
Reform	Simon Danczuk	1,968	6.3	–1.9
Independent	William Howarth	523	1.7	N/A
Independent	Mark Coleman	455	1.5	N/A
Green (Note: The Green Party withdrew Otten's endorsement on 7 February 2024, after nominations closed (2 February), so he was still identified as the Green Party candidate on the ballot paper.)	Guy Otten	436	1.4	–0.7
Independent	Michael Howarth	246	0.8	N/A
Monster Raving Loony	Ravin Rodent Subortna	209	0.7	N/A
Majority		5,697	18.4	N/A
Turnout		31,107	39.7	–20.4
Registered electors				
Workers Party gain from Labour		Swing		

== Previous result ==
General election 2019: Rochdale
Party	Candidate	Votes	%	±%
Labour	Tony Lloyd	24,475	51.6	–6.4
Conservative	Atifa Shah	14,807	31.2	+2.8
Brexit Party	Chris Green	3,867	8.2	N/A
Liberal Democrats	Andy Kelly	3,312	7.0	–1.0
Green	Sarah Croke	986	2.1	N/A
Majority		9,668	20.4	–9.2
Turnout		47,447	60.1	–4.0
Labour hold		Swing	–4.6	

== Reactions ==
The Gaza war dominated the campaign. In his election victory speech, Galloway said: "Keir Starmer, this is for Gaza. You will pay a high price for the role that you have played in enabling, encouraging and covering for the catastrophe presently going on in occupied Gaza, in the Gaza Strip". Alluding to the size of his win, over the Labour and Conservative candidates, he said, "Keir Starmer and Rishi Sunak are two cheeks of the same backside and they both got well and truly spanked tonight here in Rochdale."

Galloway also claimed he had been approached by Richard Tice to be the Reform UK party candidate.

During Galloway's victory speech a heckler accused him of being a climate change denier. The heckler stated that Galloway said at a hustings that he wanted to "extract oil and gas from the North Sea".

The largest Jewish community organisation in the UK, the Board of Deputies of British Jews, claimed that Galloway's victory marked "a dark day" for Britain's Jewish community.

On 1 March, Prime Minister Rishi Sunak held a press conference outside 10 Downing Street, at which he spoke about what he called the "shocking increase in extremist disruption and criminality" in Britain. During the conference he said, "And it's beyond alarming that last night, the Rochdale by-election returned a candidate that dismisses the horror of what happened on 7 October, who glorifies Hezbollah and is endorsed by Nick Griffin, the racist former leader of the BNP".

Labour Party Leader Sir Keir Starmer issued an apology to the people of Rochdale, saying, "I regret we had to withdraw our candidate, and apologise to voters in Rochdale. I took that decision. It was the right decision." He stated that Labour's candidate in the next general election would be a "unifier".

Reform UK performed worse than its Brexit Party counterpart in 2019, although Danczuk did win enough votes to retain his deposit, unlike his run as an independent in 2017. Richard Tice, leader of Reform UK, alleged that the election was rigged and said that Danczuk had received several threats during the campaign.

== See also ==
- International reactions to the Gaza war
- Gaza war protest vote movements
- List of United Kingdom by-elections (2010–present)
- 2012 Bradford West by-election
