= Lorna Fitzsimons =

British politician

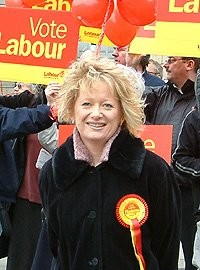
- Fitzsimons in 2005

Member of Parliament for Rochdale
- In office 1 May 1997 – 11 April 2005
- Preceded by: Liz Lynne
- Succeeded by: Paul Rowen

45th President of the National Union of Students
- In office 1992–1994
- Preceded by: Stephen Twigg
- Succeeded by: Jim Murphy

Personal details
- Born: 6 August 1967 (age 59) Littleborough, Lancashire, England
- Party: Labour
- Education: Loughborough College of Art and Design (BA)

Lorna Fitzsimons (born 6 August 1967) is a British businesswoman and former politician. A member of the Labour Party, she served as Member of Parliament (MP) for Rochdale from 1997 to 2005.

== Early life ==
Fitzsimons was born on 6 August 1967 in Littleborough, Lancashire. She attended St James CE Primary School in Wardle and Wardle High School. She then studied at Rochdale College of Art and Design, followed by Loughborough College of Art and Design where she studied for a BA in Textile Design.

Fitzsimons was the President of the National Union of Students (NUS) from 1992 to 1994, having previously held the position of NUS Vice-president (Education). She was a Director of NUS Services from 1990 to 1994, and of Endsleigh Insurance from 1992 to 1994.

== Parliamentary career ==
In 1997, at 29, Fitzsimons was elected as the Member of Parliament for Rochdale, a position she held until her defeat at the 2005 election by the Liberal Democrat candidate Paul Rowen, who had also been her opponent in the 2001 election; her defeat in 2005 was one of the narrowest at only 444 votes. She was one of the youngest MPs elected in 1997.

During her time in Parliament she held various positions, including Chair of the APPG on Kashmir and Secretary of the APPG on Pakistan. She was the Chair of the Parliamentary Labour Party Women's Committee, with 101 women MPs, from 1997 to 2001, and then vice-chair from 2001 to 2005. Fitzsimons was PPS to Robin Cook from 2001 until his resignation.

She was involved in working to modernise the procedures and practices of the House of Commons in her role as a member of both the Procedures and Modernisation Select Committees.

== Business career ==
Fitzsimons runs her own company, Lorna Fitzsimons Consulting Ltd. She was CEO of Britain Israel Communications and Research Centre from 2006 to 2012. Before entering Parliament in 1997, Fitzsimons worked at the Saatchi subsidiary Rowland Sallingbury Casey holding various positions including associate director. Her clients included BT, Manweb, P&G, UKAEA and Brown and Root.

Whilst at Rowland's Fitzsimons, won the first IPR Young Communicator of the year award in 1995. She was part of the two person team that ran the 'Soap Wars' campaign for Procter & Gamble. She has held many elected and appointed positions for national organisations, as well as being a member of governing bodies for such institutions as Sheffield Hallam University.

== Personal life ==
Fitzsimons married Stephen Benedict Cooney on 8 April 2000 in Rochdale. She has a step-daughter and step-son, and a son (born in September 2002).

Parliament of the United Kingdom
Preceded by Liz Lynne	Member of Parliament for Rochdale; 1997–2005	Succeeded by Paul Rowen
Political offices
Preceded by Stephen Twigg	President of the National Union of Students; 1992–1994	Succeeded by Jim Murphy
