= Karen C. Burke =

American legal scholar

Karen Burke

Academic background
- Education: LL.M., Boston University; J.D., Stanford Law School; Ph.D., Harvard University; M.A., Harvard University; B.A., Smith College

Academic work
- Discipline: law
- Institutions: University of Florida Levin College of Law, University of San Diego School of Law

Karen Burke is an American legal scholar and Richard B. Stephens Eminent Scholar Chair in Taxation and Professor of Law at the University of Florida Levin College of Law. Previously she was Warren Distinguished Professor of Law at the University of San Diego School of Law.

== Books ==
- Federal Income Taxation of S Corporations, 3d ed. (Foundation Press, forthcoming 2022) (with John K. McNulty)
- Partnership Taxation, 4th ed. (Aspen Law & Business, forthcoming 2021) (with George K. Yin)
- Federal Income Taxation of Partners and Partnerships, 6th ed. (West Group, 2020)
- Federal Income Taxation of Corporations and Stockholders, 8th ed. (West Group, 2019)
- Partnership Taxation, 3d ed. (Aspen Law & Business, 2017) (with George K. Yin)
- Corporate Taxation, 2d ed. (Aspen Law & Business, 2016) (with George K. Yin)
