= Karen Danczuk =

British former local politician

Karen Marie Danczuk
- Born: Karen Marie Burke; 1983 (age 42–43); Middleton, Rochdale, England
- Occupations: Former councillor, television personality, campaigner
- Organizations: Patron of the National Association for People Abused in Childhood
- Known for: Councillor for Kingsway (Rochdale), media appearances, advocacy for abuse survivors
- Television: NHS in Crisis: Live Debate (2015); Celebrity Island with Bear Grylls (2016); Loose Women (guest appearances)
- Spouse: Simon Danczuk (m. 2012; sep. 2015)
- Children: 2 sons

Karen Marie Danczuk, née Burke (born 1983) is a British former local councillor for Kingsway, Rochdale metro. She came to prominence as the wife of Simon Danczuk, who was Member of Parliament for the Rochdale constituency from 2010 to 2017. In 2017, she applied to be a Labour MP.

== Personal life ==
Danczuk is from Middleton, Rochdale. She married Simon Danczuk in 2012. They have two sons. The couple separated in June 2015. In July 2015, he said that he had been suffering from depression caused by his campaigning work on child sexual abuse and that this had affected their marriage.

== Television work ==
Danczuk took part in 2015 in the TV programme, NHS in Crisis: Live Debate and was a participant in 2016's Celebrity Island with Bear Grylls. She has appeared on Loose Women several times.

She is a campaigner for victims of sexual abuse, and a patron for the National Association for People Abused in Childhood.
