= Elsie Blundell =

British politician

Elsie Blundell MP
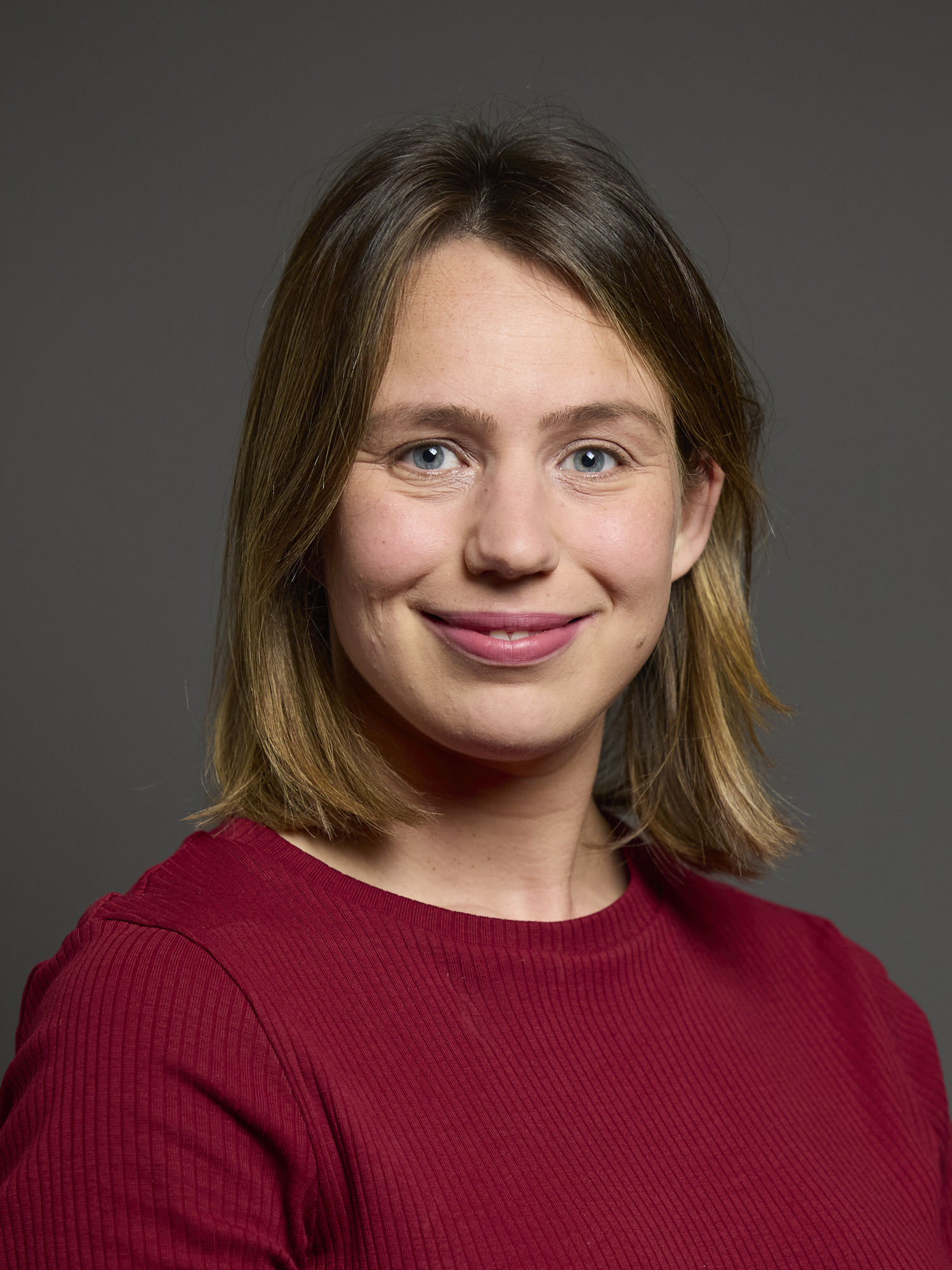
- Official portrait, 2024

Member of Parliament for Heywood and Middleton North
- Incumbent
- Assumed office 4 July 2024
- Preceded by: Chris Clarkson
- Majority: 6,082 (16.4%)

Personal details
- Born: Elsie Jane Wraighte; August 1990 (age 36) Barrow-in-Furness, Cumbria, England
- Party: Labour
- Spouse: John Blundell (m. 2022)
- Education: Ulverston Victoria High School; Barrow Sixth Form College
- Alma mater: University of Manchester

Elsie-Jane Blundell (née Wraighte; born August 1990) is a British Labour politician who has been Member of Parliament (MP) for Heywood and Middleton North since the 2024.

== Early life and education ==
Blundell is from Barrow-in-Furness, Cumbria, England. She attended Ulverston Victoria High School and Barrow Sixth Form College. She studied politics and international relations at the University of Manchester, graduating in 2012. She moved to Rochdale in 2015.

== Political career ==
From 2019 until 2025, she was a Labour and Co-operative councillor for the Balderstone and Kirkholt ward of Rochdale Metropolitan Borough Council; she was re-elected in 2022 and 2023.

In the 2024 general election, Blundell was elected as a Labour MP for Heywood and Middleton North with 15,069 votes (40.6%) and a majority of 6,082.

== Personal life ==
In 2022, she married John Blundell, a fellow councillor on Rochdale Borough Council. She is a Christian.
