= Paul Rowen =

British politician

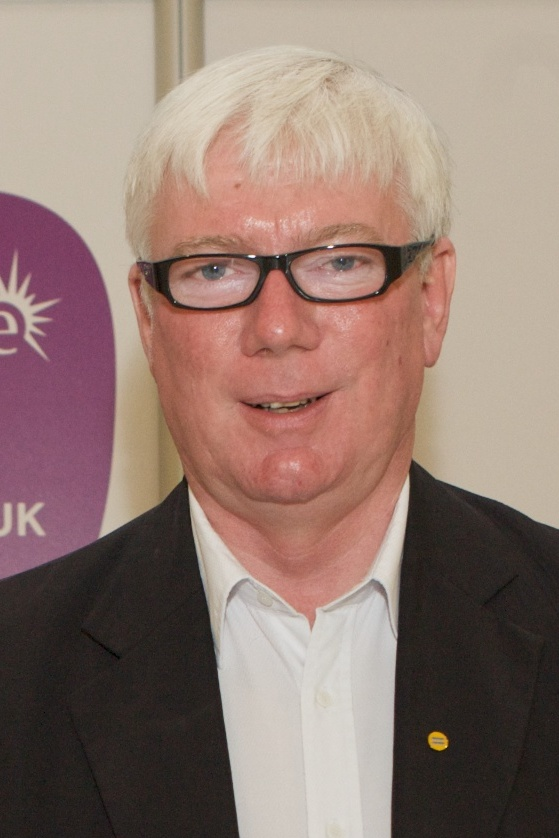
- Rowen during the 2009 Liberal Democrat Conference

Member of Parliament for Rochdale
- In office 6 May 2005 – 12 April 2010
- Preceded by: Lorna Fitzsimons
- Succeeded by: Simon Danczuk
- Majority: 444 (1.1%)

Personal details
- Born: Paul John Rowen; 11 May 1955 (age 71) Rochdale, Lancashire, England
- Party: Liberal Democrat
- Education: University of Nottingham

Paul John Rowen (born 11 May 1955) is a British Liberal Democrat politician. He was the Member of Parliament (MP) for Rochdale from 2005 until the 2010 general election, when he was defeated by Labour Party candidate Simon Danczuk.

== Early life and career ==
Born in Rochdale, Rowen went to the Bishop Henshaw RC Memorial High School in Rochdale. From the University of Nottingham, he graduated with a BSc in Chemistry and Geology in 1976. From 1977 to 1980, he taught Science at Kimberley School in Nottinghamshire. From 1980 to 1986, he was Head of Chemistry at St Albans RC High School, Warren Lane in Oldham (now closed), then Head of Science at Our Ladys RC High School from 1986 to 1990. From 1990 to 2005, he was Deputy Headteacher of Yorkshire Martyrs Catholic College on Westgate Hill Street in Tong, West Yorkshire.

== Political career ==
Rowen was leader of Rochdale Council from 1992 to 1996. He contested the Rochdale seat in the 2001 general election, and won the seat in 2005 by around 400 votes; this reclaimed the seat for the Liberal Democrats since they lost the seat in 1997.

In the House of Commons he became a Liberal Democrat spokesman for Work and Pensions, having previously worked on disability issues.

He is a member of the Beveridge Group.

== Outside Parliament ==
Rowen is the Patron of the Greater Manchester branch of domestic violence charity the ManKind Initiative.

He is also a paid director of a Ugandan property company called Corinya.

== Independent Inquiry into Child Sexual Abuse (IICSA) ==
On 24 October 2017, Rowen gave evidence to the Independent Inquiry into Child Sexual Abuse (IICSA) as part of its investigation into Cambridge House, Knowl View and Rochdale.

During his evidence Rowen admitted to recommending that known sex offender Cyril Smith be made a governor of Knowl View School, a residential facility in Rochdale where boys had been subjected to child sexual abuse, including by Smith. Rowen said he made the recommendation despite being aware of allegations that had been made about Smith as far back as 1979.

Rowen had also previously defended making Smith a governor of the school. In a 2014 newspaper interview, he said: "At the time there was concern that we needed people with some stature and standing that could keep an eye on the place". In the interview he denied knowing allegations had been made against Smith but during the IICSA hearings three years later admitted reading a local newspaper article about the allegations and being aware that the former leader of the Liberal Democrats, David Steele had interviewed Smith.

In its report, which was published in 2018, IICSA said: "We think that Mr Rowen bore considerable responsibility for the school as Leader (of the council). We felt he was prepared to blame others for their faults without acknowledging his own failures of leadership. At best, he was insufficiently inquisitive about Knowl View School when the evidence that he knew about was that serious problems persisted there, which would not be resolved quickly; at worst, he turned a blind eye to the very serious problems that were in his judgment low down on the priority list."

== Personal life ==
Rowen lists on his website that he enjoys hill-walking, travel and reading.

He is a practising Roman Catholic.

== Notes and references ==
Parliament of the United Kingdom
Preceded by Lorna Fitzsimons	Member of Parliament for Rochdale; 2005–2010	Succeeded by Simon Danczuk
