= 2021 Rochdale Metropolitan Borough Council election =

2021 local election in England

2021 Rochdale Council election
- 6 May 2021

One third of seats (20) of Rochdale Metropolitan Borough Council 31 seats needed for a majority
	First party	Second party	Third party
Leader	Allen Brett	Ashley Dearnley	Andy Kelly
Party	Labour	Conservative	Liberal Democrats
Last election	16 seats, 49.4%	3 seats, 21.3%	1 seat, 10.9%
Seats before	45	9	3
Seats won	16	3	1
Seats after	45	9	3
Seat change	Steady	Steady	Steady
Popular vote	27,846	17,771	6,949
Percentage	49.4%	31.5%	12.3%
Swing	Steady	▲10.2%	▲1.4%
- Map showing the results of the 2021 Rochdale Metropolitan Borough Council election
Council control before election
Allen Brett
Labour
Subsequent council control
Neil Emmott
Labour

The 2021 Rochdale Metropolitan Borough Council election took place on 6 May 2021 to elect members of Rochdale Borough Council in England. This was on the same day as other local elections. One-third of the seats were up for election.

== Results ==
2021 Rochdale Metropolitan Borough Council election
Party	This election				Full council			This election		
Party	Candidates	Seats	Net	Seats %	Other	Total	Total %	Votes	Votes %	+/−
Labour	{{{candidates}}}	16	Steady	80.0	29	45	75.0	27,846	49.4	Steady
Conservative	{{{candidates}}}	3	Steady	15.0	6	9	15.0	17,771	31.5	▲10.2
Liberal Democrats	{{{candidates}}}	1	Steady	5.0	2	3	5.0	6,949	12.3	▲1.4
Independent	{{{candidates}}}	0	Steady	0.0	3	3	5.0	922	1.6	New
Green	{{{candidates}}}	0	Steady	0.0	0	0	0.0	2,621	4.7	▲1.1
Freedom Alliance	{{{candidates}}}	0	Steady	0.0	0	0	0.0	88	0.2	New
UKIP	{{{candidates}}}	0	Steady	0.0	0	0	0.0	74	0.1	▼14.8
SDP	{{{candidates}}}	0	Steady	0.0	0	0	0.0	71	0.1	New

== Ward results ==
=== Balderstone and Kirkholt ===
Balderstone and Kirkholt
Party	Candidate	Votes	%	±%
Labour	Philip Massey	1,473	60.0	+15.0
Conservative	Jacqueline Holt	710	28.9	+18.5
Green	James O'Meara	186	7.6	+1.3
Freedom Alliance	Laura Grabowska	88	3.6	N/A
Majority		763		
Labour hold		Swing		

=== Bamford ===
Bamford
Party	Candidate	Votes	%	±%
Conservative	Stephen Anstee	1,809	56.0	+8.2
Labour	Elizabeth Atewologun	988	30.6	−2.8
Green	Edward Whittaker	223	6.9	+0.6
Liberal Democrats	Siobhain Cunnane	211	6.5	+2.0
Majority		821		
Conservative hold		Swing		

=== Castleton ===
Castleton
Party	Candidate	Votes	%	±%
Labour	Billy Sheerin	1,510	55.6	+8.1
Conservative	David Jones	840	30.9	+8.8
Liberal Democrats	Sarah Kisa-Smith	197	7.3	+3.1
Green	Jonathan Kershaw	169	6.2	−2.8
Majority		670		
Labour hold		Swing		

=== Central Rochdale ===
Central Rochdale
Party	Candidate	Votes	%	±%
Labour	Iftikhar Ahmed	2,756	84.6	+5.9
Conservative	David Jones	218	6.7	−0.2
Liberal Democrats	Barrie Nicholson	166	5.1	−9.4
Green	Adam Mir	118	3.6	N/A
Majority		2,538		
Labour hold		Swing		

=== East Middleton ===
East Middleton
Party	Candidate	Votes	%	±%
Labour	Terrance Smith	1,449	58.3	+0.9
Conservative	Stephen Sanderson	774	31.2	+14.3
Liberal Democrats	Ian Aspinall	190	7.6	N/A
SDP	Robert Mudd	71	2.9	−22.8
Majority		675		
Labour hold		Swing		

=== Healey ===
Healey
Party	Candidate	Votes	%	±%
Labour	Shaun O'Neill	1,660	54.7	+8.5
Conservative	Robert McLean	950	31.3	+8.7
Liberal Democrats	Mark Alcock	259	8.5	−5.7
Green	AJ Rennie	166	5.5	N/A
Majority		710	23.4	
Labour hold		Swing		

=== Hopwood Hall ===
Hopwood Hall
Party	Candidate	Votes	%	±%
Labour	Linda Robinson	1,206	48.7	−2.8
Conservative	Paul Ellison	922	37.3	+15.7
Independent	Ian Kilgannon	254	10.3	N/A
Liberal Democrats	Tony Hughes	92	3.7	N/A
Majority		284		
Labour hold		Swing		

=== Kingsway ===
Kingsway
Party	Candidate	Votes	%	±%
Labour	Shakil Ahmed	2,235	71.9	+1.7
Conservative	Andrew Nelson	461	14.8	+4.3
Liberal Democrats	Stephen Thornley	210	6.8	−1.9
Green	Mark Hollinrake	203	6.5	−4.1
Majority		1,774		
Labour hold		Swing		

=== Littleborough Lakeside ===
Littleborough Lakeside
Party	Candidate	Votes	%	±%
Labour	John Hartley	1,097	37.0	+2.3
Conservative	Gareth Hobson	998	33.7	+6.6
Liberal Democrats	Kate Clegg	866	29.2	+12.1
Majority		99	3.3	
Labour hold		Swing		

=== Milkstone and Deeplish ===
Milkstone and Deeplish
Party	Candidate	Votes	%	±%
Labour	Allen Brett	2,020	63.5	−20.3
Liberal Democrats	Hassan Ansari	637	20.0	+14.3
Conservative	Rizwan Shafiq	409	12.8	+7.6
Green	Feruz Ali	117	3.7	−1.5
Majority		1,383	43.4	
Labour hold		Swing		

=== Milnrow and Newhey ===
Milnrow and Newhey
Party	Candidate	Votes	%	±%
Liberal Democrats	Irene Davidson	1,650	55.9	−4.1
Labour	Neil Butterworth	802	27.2	+6.4
Conservative	Daniel Nuttal	499	16.9	+10.5
Majority		848		
Liberal Democrats hold		Swing		

=== Norden ===
Norden
Party	Candidate	Votes	%	±%
Conservative	James Gartside	2,110	66.5	+11.3
Labour	Shahid Mohammed	476	15.0	−3.7
Liberal Democrats	Stephanie Robertson	340	10.7	+2.3
Green	Sarah Croke	246	7.8	+0.6
Majority		1,634		
Conservative hold		Swing		

=== North Heywood ===
North Heywood
Party	Candidate	Votes	%	±%
Labour	Liam O'Rourke	1,156	53.6	−1.2
Conservative	Nigel Morrell	658	30.5	+15.0
Independent	Martin Orson	166	7.7	N/A
Liberal Democrats	Donna Chadwick	103	4.8	N/A
UKIP	Bernard Akin	74	3.4	−26.4
Majority		498		
Labour hold		Swing		

=== North Middleton ===
North Middleton
Party	Candidate	Votes	%	±%
Labour	Donna Williams	1,315	58.1	+3.3
Conservative	Adrian Coan	713	31.5	+16.8
Green	Kat Horrex	142	6.3	N/A
Liberal Democrats	Ben Keane-Lyons	92	4.1	N/A
Majority		602		
Labour hold		Swing		

=== Smallbridge and Firgrove ===
Smallbridge and Firgrove
Party	Candidate	Votes	%	±%
Labour	Amna Mir	1,449	55.0	−3.7
Conservative	Leonard Branton	520	19.7	+9.4
Liberal Democrats	Dean Larder	505	19.2	+6.3
Green	Jules Howliston	161	6.1	N/A
Majority		929	35.3	
Labour hold		Swing		

=== South Middleton ===
South Middleton
Party	Candidate	Votes	%	±%
Labour	Peter Joinson	1,663	54.3	+6.6
Conservative	Karen Winkler	1,032	33.7	+7.6
Green	Martin Collinge	249	8.1	N/A
Liberal Democrats	Emma Griffin	118	3.9	−4.6
Majority		631	20.6	
Labour hold		Swing		

=== Spotland and Falinge ===
Spotland and Falinge
Party	Candidate	Votes	%	±%
Labour	Iram Faisal	1,283	39.5	−22.2
Liberal Democrats	Rabina Asghar	1,030	31.8	+24.7
Conservative	Steven Scholes	624	19.2	+3.6
Green	Mick Coats	307	9.5	−6.0
Majority		253	7.7	
Labour hold		Swing		

=== Wardle and West Littleborough ===
Wardle and West Littleborough
Party	Candidate	Votes	%	±%
Conservative	Ashley Dearnley	2,112	69.9	+20.7
Labour	Julian Farnell	599	19.8	−4.3
Green	Hannah Macguire	206	6.8	N/A
Liberal Democrats	Richard Eden-Maughan	103	3.4	−10.2
Majority		1,513	50.1	
Conservative hold		Swing		

=== West Heywood ===
West Heywood
Party	Candidate	Votes	%	±%
Labour	Wendy Cocks	1,154	46.2	−3.1
Conservative	Jordan Tarrant-Short	715	28.6	+13.8
Independent	Colin Lambert	502	20.1	N/A
Green	Guy Otten	128	5.1	N/A
Majority		439	17.6	
Labour hold		Swing		

=== West Middleton ===
West Middleton
Party	Candidate	Votes	%	±%
Labour	Susan Smith	1,555	63.9	+7.7
Conservative	Aaron Slack	697	28.7	+14.6
Liberal Democrats	Nikki Edwards	180	7.4	N/A
Majority		858	35.2	
Labour hold		Swing		
