= Neil Emmott =

British Labour politician

Leader of Rochdale Borough Council
- Incumbent
- Assumed office 19 May 2021
- Preceded by: Allen Brett

Member of the Greater Manchester Combined Authority
- Incumbent
- Assumed office May 2021

Member of Rochdale Metropolitan Borough Council for West Middleton
- Incumbent
- Assumed office 6 May 2010
- Majority: 893

Personal details
- Party: Labour
- Education: Swansea University

Neil Patrick Emmott is a British Labour politician and leader of Rochdale Metropolitan Borough Council in Greater Manchester. As leader he is also a member of the Greater Manchester Combined Authority and is the combined authority's portfolio lead for Culture.

First elected to the council in 1986, he served on the council until 1994 before stepping down. He returned to politics in 2010 where he was elected to his current seat in the West Middleton ward, and was elected as leader of the council following the 2021 elections after challenging former leader Allen Brett for the leadership position.

Political offices
Preceded by Allen Brett	Leader of Rochdale Metropolitan Borough Council; 2021–present	Incumbent
