= Rochdale Borough Council =

Local government body in England

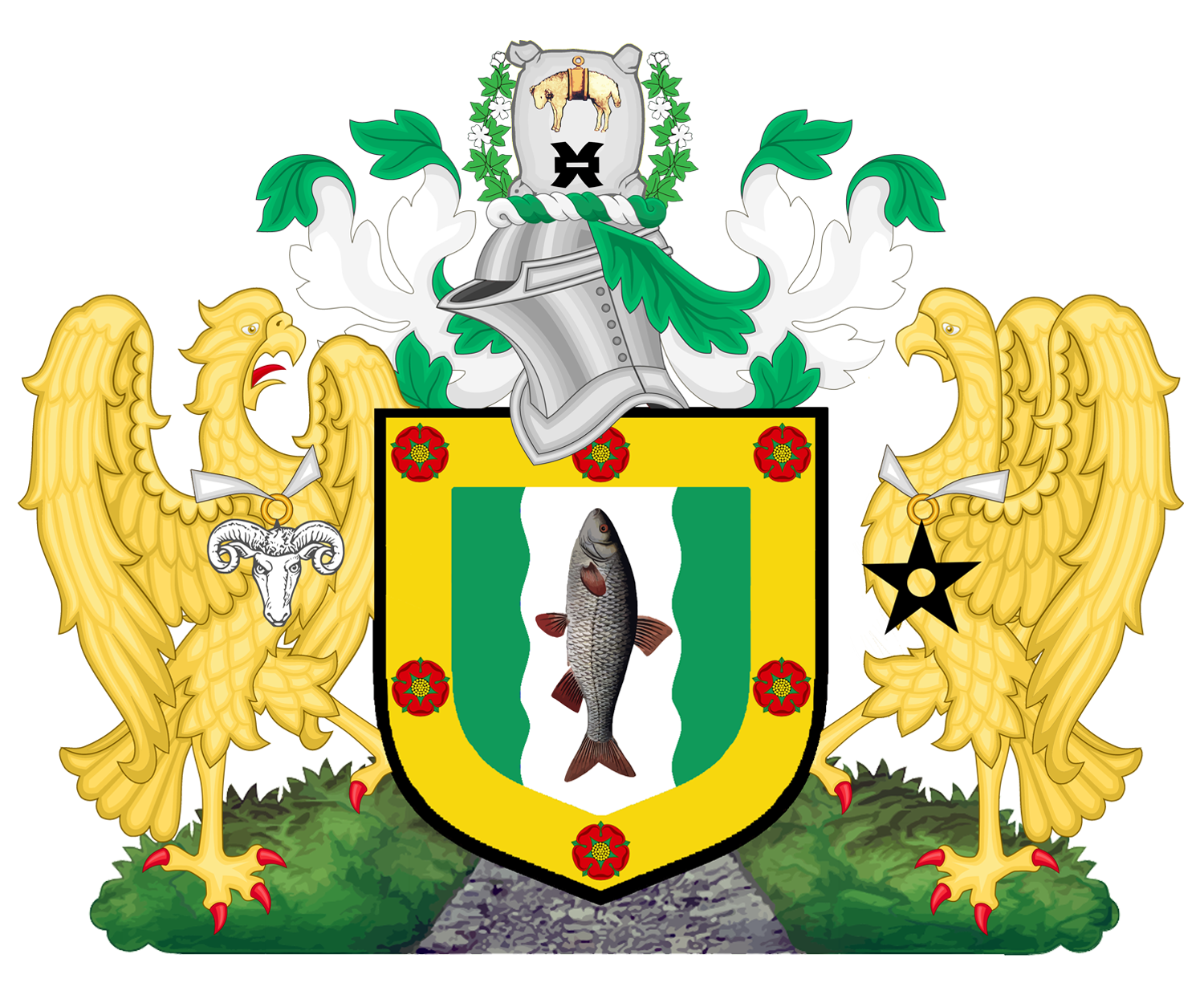
- Coat of arms

- Corporate logo

Type
- Type: Metropolitan borough

History
- Founded: 1 April 1974

Leadership
- Mayor: Faisal Rana, Labour since 20 May 2026
- Leader: Neil Emmott, Labour since 19 May 2021
- Chief Executive: Julie Murphy since December 2025

Structure
- Seats: 60 councillors
- Graph of the party split among 60 seats.
- Political groups: Administration (31) Labour (31) Other parties (29) Reform (15) Conservative (7) Workers Party (4) Liberal Democrats (3)
- Joint committees: Greater Manchester Combined Authority; Greater Manchester Police, Fire and Crime Panel
- Length of term: 4 years

Elections
- Voting system: First-past-the-post
- Last election: 7 May 2026
- Next election: 6 May 2027

Meeting place
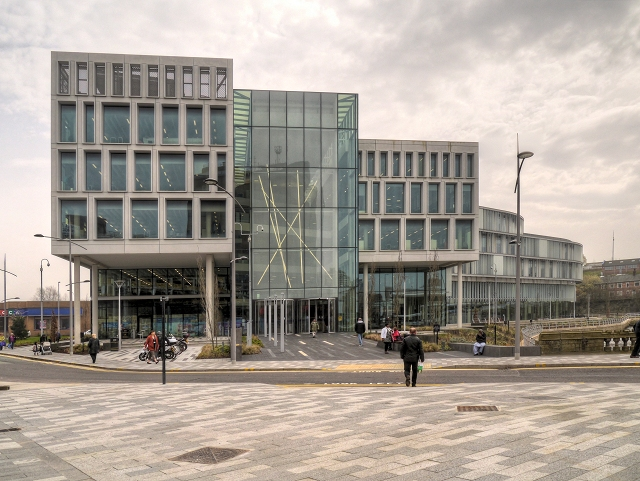
- Number One Riverside, Smith Street, Rochdale

Website
- www.rochdale.gov.uk

Rochdale Borough Council is the local authority of the Metropolitan Borough of Rochdale in Greater Manchester, England. It is a metropolitan borough council and provides the majority of local government services in the borough. The council has been a member of the Greater Manchester Combined Authority since 2011.

The council has been under Labour majority control since 2011. It is based at Number One Riverside.

== History ==
The town of Rochdale had been governed by improvement commissioners from 1825. In 1856 the town was incorporated as a municipal borough, governed by a body formally called the 'mayor, aldermen and burgesses of the borough of Rochdale', generally known as the corporation, town council or borough council. When elected county councils were established in 1889, Rochdale was considered large enough for its existing council to provide county-level services, and so it was made a county borough, independent from the new Lancashire County Council, whilst remaining part of the geographical county of Lancashire.

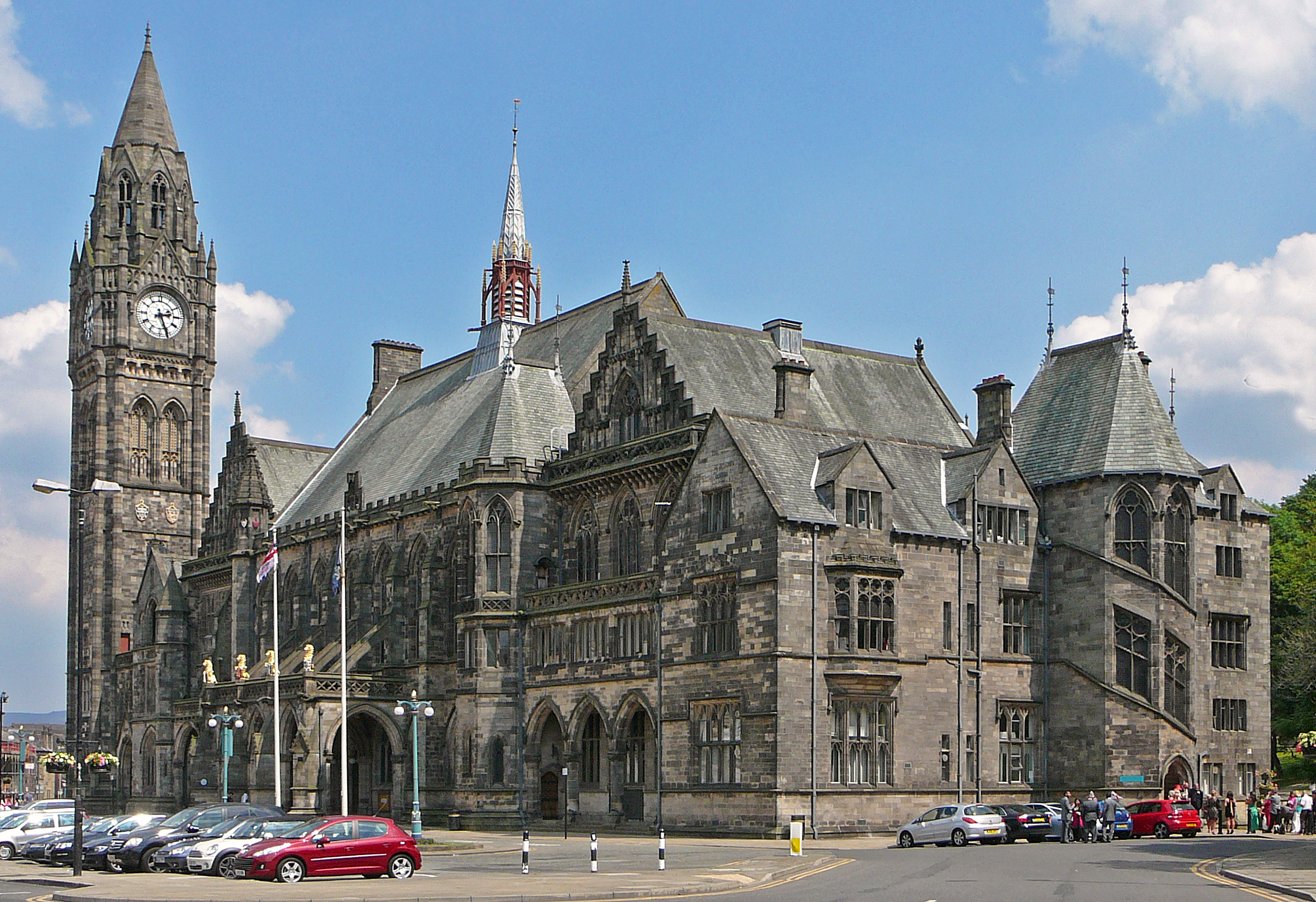
Rochdale Town Hall: Completed 1871 for old borough council and served as modern council's headquarters until 2013. Still used by council for annual mayor-making ceremony.

The larger Metropolitan Borough of Rochdale and its council were created in 1974 under the Local Government Act 1972 as one of ten metropolitan districts within the new metropolitan county of Greater Manchester. The first election was held in 1973. For its first year the council acted as a shadow authority alongside the area's six outgoing authorities, being the borough councils of Rochdale, Heywood and Middleton and the urban district councils of Littleborough, Milnrow and Wardle. The new metropolitan district and its council formally came into being on 1 April 1974, at which point the old districts and their councils were abolished.

The metropolitan district was awarded borough status from its creation, allowing the chair of the council to take the title of mayor, continuing Rochdale's series of mayors dating back to 1856. The council styles itself Rochdale Borough Council rather than its full formal name of Rochdale Metropolitan Borough Council.

From 1974 until 1986 the council was a lower-tier authority, with upper-tier functions provided by the Greater Manchester County Council. The county council was abolished in 1986 and its functions passed to Greater Manchester's ten borough councils, including Rochdale, with some services provided through joint committees.

Since 2011 the council has been a member of the Greater Manchester Combined Authority, which has been led by the directly elected Mayor of Greater Manchester since 2017. The combined authority provides strategic leadership and co-ordination for certain functions across Greater Manchester, notably regarding transport and town planning, but Rochdale Council continues to be responsible for most local government functions.

== Governance ==
Rochdale Borough Council provides metropolitan borough services. Some strategic functions in the area are provided by the Greater Manchester Combined Authority; the leader of Rochdale Council sits on the combined authority as Rochdale's representative. There are no civil parishes in the borough.

=== Political control ===
Rochdale has been under Labour majority control since 2011.

Political control of the council since the 1974 reforms took effect has been as follows:

Party in control	Years
Labour	1974–1975
No overall control	1975–1976
Conservative	1976–1979
No overall control	1979–1980
Labour	1980–1982
No overall control	1982–1986
Labour	1986–1992
No overall control	1992–1996
Labour	1996–2003
No overall control	2003–2007
Liberal Democrats	2007–2010
No overall control	2010–2011
Labour	2011–present

=== Leadership ===
The role of mayor is largely ceremonial in Rochdale. Political leadership is instead provided by the leader of the council. The leaders since 1974 have been:

Councillor	Party	From	To
Derrick Walker	Labour	1 Apr 1974	1976
Edward Collins	Conservative	1976	May 1980
Stephen Moore	Labour	May 1980	May 1982
Edward Collins	Conservative	May 1982	Jan 1986
Ron Lewis	Conservative	Jan 1986	May 1986
Richard Farnell	Labour	May 1986	May 1992
Paul Rowen	Liberal Democrats	13 May 1992	May 1996
Jim Dobbin	Labour	May 1996	May 1997
Peter Roberts	Labour	May 1997	2006
Alan Taylor	Liberal Democrats	2006	Jan 2010
Irene Davidson	Liberal Democrats	Jan 2010	24 Nov 2010
Colin Lambert	Labour	15 Dec 2010	4 Jun 2014
Richard Farnell	Labour	4 Jun 2014	8 Dec 2017
Allen Brett	Labour	13 Dec 2017	May 2021
Neil Emmott	Labour	19 May 2021	

=== Composition ===
Following the 2026 election, the composition of the council was:

Party	Seats
Labour	31
Reform	15
Conservative	7
Workers Party	4
Liberal Democrats	3
Total	60

The next election is due in May 2027.

== Elections ==
Since the last boundary changes in 2022, the council has comprised 60 councillors representing 20 wards, with each ward electing three councillors. Elections are held three years out of every four, with a third of the council (one councillor for each ward) elected each time for a four-year term of office.

== Wards and councillors ==
Each ward of the council's 20 wards is represented by three councillors.

Ward	Councillor	Party	Term of office
Bamford	Stephen Anstee	Conservative	2021–2027
Bamford	Angela Smith	Conservative	2018–2026
Bamford	Philip Beal	Conservative	2024–2028
Balderstone and Kirkholt	Jordan Tarrant-Short	Reform	2025–2027 (Note: Elected in a by-election in May 2025)
Balderstone and Kirkholt	Ashley-Louise Gilbert	Reform	2026-2030
Balderstone and Kirkholt	Daniel Meredith	Labour	2024–2028
Castleton	Aisling-Blaise Gallagher	Labour	2024–2028
Castleton	Aasim Rashid	Labour	2023–2027
Castleton	Dave Jones	Reform	2026-2030
Central Rochdale	Farooq Ahmed	Workers Party	2024–2028
Central Rochdale	Waqar Khan	Workers Party	2026-2030
Central Rochdale	Sameena Zaheer	Labour	2023–2027
East Middleton	Georgina Jaques	Labour	2026-2030
East Middleton	Terry Smith	Labour	2023–2027
East Middleton	Dylan James Williams	Labour	2024–2028
Healey	Tricia Ayrton	Labour	2022–2027
Healey	Mark Stephens	Reform	2026-2030
Healey	Shah Wazir	Labour	2024–2028
Hopwood Hall	Stephen Potter	Reform	2026-2030
Hopwood Hall	Peter Hodgkinson	Labour	2023–2027
Hopwood Hall	Carol Wardle	Labour	2024-2028
Kingsway	Shakil Ahmed	Labour	2026-2030
Kingsway	Daalat Ali	Labour	2024–2028
Kingsway	Rachel Massey	Labour	2023–2027
Littleborough Lakeside	Tom Besford	Labour	2024–2028
Littleborough Lakeside	Victoria Howard	Reform	2026-2030
Littleborough Lakeside	Richard Jackson	Labour	2023–2027
Milkstone and Deeplish	Mohammed Shafiq	Workers Party	2026-2030
Milkstone and Deeplish	Minaam Ellahi	Workers Party	2024–2028
Milkstone and Deeplish	Aiza Rashid	Labour	2023–2027
Milnrow and Newhey	David Bamford	Liberal Democrats	2023–2027
Milnrow and Newhey	Anthony Gilbert	Reform	2026-2030
Milnrow and Newhey	Andy Kelly	Liberal Democrats	2024–2028
Norden	Paul Eillison	Conservative	2026-2030
Norden	Michael Holly	Conservative	2023–2027
Norden	Peter Winkler	Conservative	2024–2028
North Heywood	Michael Howard	Reform	2026-2030
North Heywood	Bev Place	Labour	2023–2027
North Heywood	Paul O'Neill	Labour	2024–2028
North Middleton	Lee Wolf	Reform	2026-2030
North Middleton	Elizabeth Atewologun	Labour	2023–2027
North Middleton	Kath Bromfield	Labour	2024–2028
Smallbridge and Firgrove	John Blundell	Labour	2024–2028
Smallbridge and Firgrove	Mohammed Khizer	Liberal Democrats	2026-2030
Smallbridge and Firgrove	Amna Mir	Labour	2023-2027
South Middleton	Patricia Mary Dale	Labour	2023–2027
South Middleton	June West	Labour	2024–2028
South Middleton	Matthew Pilkington	Reform	2026-2030
Spotland and Falinge	Carl Faulkner	Reform	2026-2030
Spotland and Falinge	Amber Nisa	Labour	2023–2027
Spotland and Falinge	Faisal Rana	Labour	2024–2028
Wardle, Shore & West Littleborough	Philip Barrett	Reform	2026-2030
Wardle, Shore & West Littleborough	Adam Branton	Conservative	2024–2028
Wardle, Shore & West Littleborough	John Taylor	Conservative	2023–2027
West Heywood	Stuart Crawford	Reform	2026-2030
West Heywood	Peter Joinson	Labour	2024–2028
West Heywood	Linda Robinson	Labour	2023–2027
West Middleton	Trevor Taylor	Reform	2026-2030
West Middleton	Neil Emmott	Labour	2023–2027
West Middleton	Susan Smith	Labour	2024–2028

== Premises ==
The council is based at Number One Riverside on Smith Street in the centre of Rochdale. It was purpose-built for the council and opened in 2013. Prior to 2013 the council met and had some offices at Rochdale Town Hall, which had been completed in 1871 for the old borough council, with additional offices spread across numerous other buildings. The Town Hall is still used for certain ceremonial functions, including the annual council meeting when new mayors are appointed.
