= Premiership of Gordon Brown =

Period of the Government of the United Kingdom from 2007 to 2010

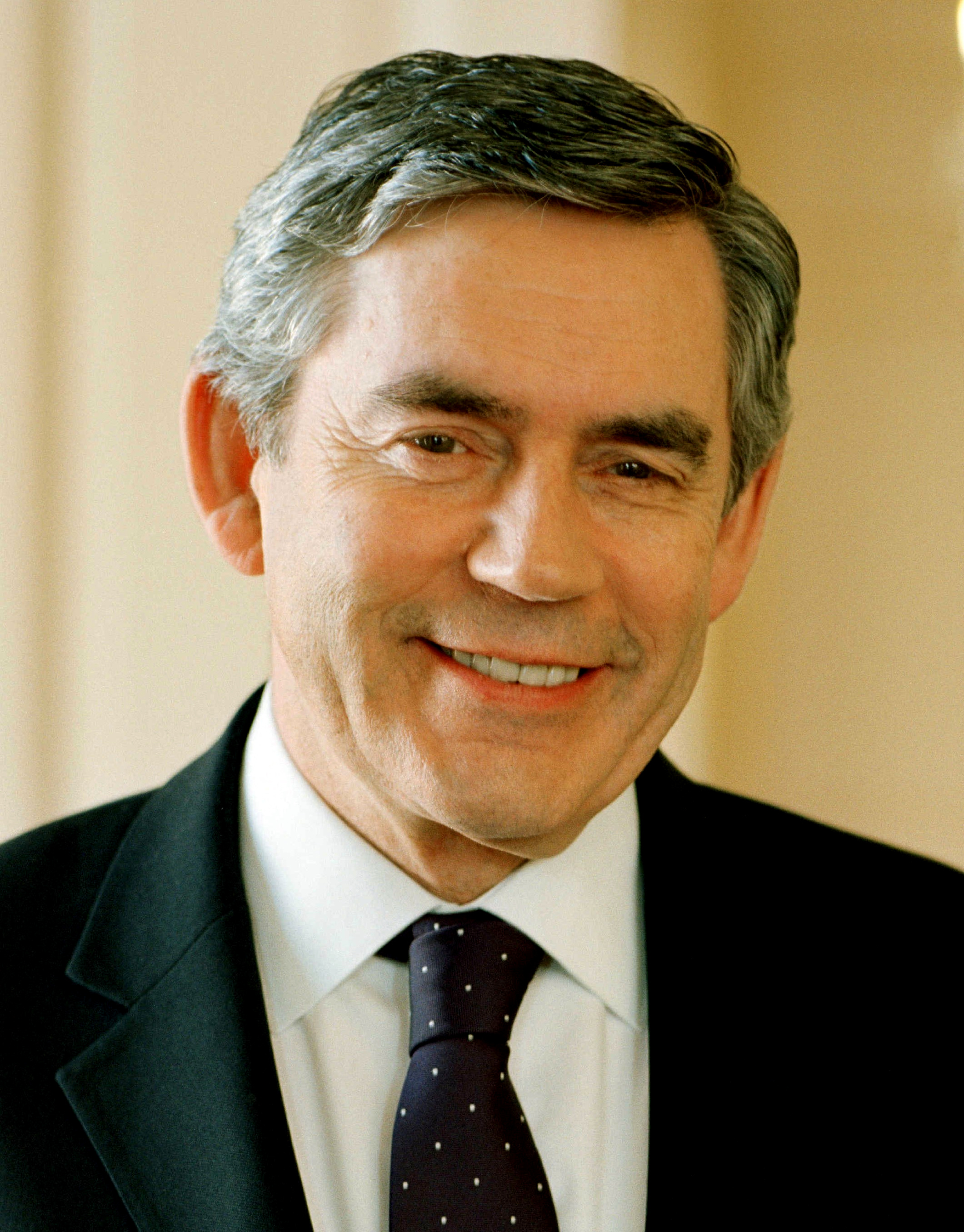
- Official portrait, 2008
- Premiership of Gordon Brown; 27 June 2007 – 11 May 2010
- Monarch: Elizabeth II
- Cabinet: Brown ministry
- Party: Labour
- Seat: 10 Downing Street
- Coat of Arms of HM Government

Gordon Brown's tenure as Prime Minister of the United Kingdom began on 27 June 2007 when he accepted an invitation from Queen Elizabeth II to form a government, succeeding Tony Blair, and ended on 11 May 2010 upon his resignation. As prime minister, Brown also served simultaneously as First Lord of the Treasury, Minister for the Civil Service, and Leader of the Labour Party. He and Blair both extensively used the New Labour branding while in office, though Brown's style of government differed from that of his predecessor. Brown rescinded some of the policies which had been introduced or were planned by Blair's administrations. He remained committed to close ties with the United States and to the war in Iraq, although he established an inquiry into the reasons for Britain's participation in the conflict. He proposed a "government of all the talents" which would involve co-opting leading personalities from industry and professional occupations into government positions. Brown also appointed Jacqui Smith as the UK's first female home secretary, while Brown's former position as Chancellor of the Exchequer was taken over by Alistair Darling.

Brown's government introduced monetary and fiscal policies to help keep the banks afloat during the 2008 financial crisis, and as a result the United Kingdom's national debt increased dramatically. The Government took majority shareholdings in Northern Rock and Royal Bank of Scotland, both of which experienced financial difficulties. Large amounts of money were injected into several other banks, including newly merged HBOS-Lloyds TSB, which received £17 billion. Domestic policies focusing on education, employment and health were introduced by the administration. The Labour Party was persuaded to give Gurkhas settlement rights in Britain by the campaign of actress Joanna Lumley and attracted criticism for its handling of the Scottish Government's release of Abdelbaset al-Megrahi—the only person to have been convicted over the 1988 Lockerbie bombing.

During the first four months of his premiership, Brown enjoyed a substantial lead in the polls. His popularity amongst the public may have been because his handling of numerous serious events during his first few weeks as prime minister, including two attempted terrorist attacks in London and Glasgow at the end of June 2007. However, between the end of 2007 and September 2008, his popularity fell significantly; two contributing factors were believed to be his perceived change of mind over plans to call a general election in October 2007 and his handling of the 10p tax rate cut in 2008, which led to allegations of weakness and dithering. Brown has since claimed that Labour would have won a 2007 election but he did not believe an early election was in the national interest. His unpopularity led eight Labour MPs to call for a leadership contest in September 2008, less than 15 months into his premiership. The threat of a leadership contest receded due to his perceived strong handling of the 2008 financial crisis in October, but his popularity hit an all-time low and his position became increasingly untenable following the May 2009 expenses scandal and Labour's poor results in the 2009 local and European elections.

With the onset of the Great Recession, the Labour government under Brown took the blame from a worsening economic climate, soaring unemployment and the expenses scandal. Brown's cabinet began to rebel; there were several key resignations in the run up to local elections in June 2009. However, Brown was backed by his party. He faced a second attempt to launch a leadership challenge by former Cabinet colleagues Geoff Hoon and Patricia Hewitt in January 2010, but the plot failed to gather momentum and Brown remained as both Labour leader and prime minister to lead his party into the 2010 general election. The election resulted in a hung parliament, with the Conservative Party winning the largest number of seats but falling short of an overall majority.

Brown remained prime minister while the Liberal Democrats entered separate negotiations with Labour and the Conservatives with a view to forming a coalition government. He announced his intention to resign on 10 May 2010 to help broker a Labour-Liberal Democrat deal. However, this became increasingly unlikely and on 11 May, realising that a deal between the Conservatives and the Liberal Democrats was imminent, Brown resigned as prime minister and Labour Party leader, ending 13 years of Labour government. He was succeeded as prime minister by Conservative leader David Cameron and as Labour leader by Ed Miliband. Brown's premiership has generally been viewed as average in historical rankings and public opinion of British prime ministers.

== Labour leadership bid ==
In October 2004, Tony Blair announced he would not lead the party into a fourth general election, but would serve a full third term. Political comment over the relationship between Blair and his chancellor Gordon Brown continued up to and beyond the 2005 election, which Labour won with a reduced majority and reduced vote share. Blair announced on 7 September 2006 that he would step down within a year. Brown was the clear favourite to succeed Blair; he was the only candidate spoken of seriously in Westminster. Appearances and news coverage leading up to the handover were interpreted as preparing the ground for Brown to become Prime Minister, in part by creating the impression of a statesman with a vision for leadership and global change. This enabled Brown to signal the most significant priorities for his agenda as prime minister; speaking at a Fabian Society conference on 'The Next Decade' in January 2007, he stressed education, international development, narrowing inequalities (to pursue 'equality of opportunity and fairness of outcome'), renewing Britishness, restoring trust in politics, and winning hearts and minds in the war on terror as key priorities.

On 11 May 2007, following months of speculation, Brown formally announced his bid for the Labour leadership and replaced Blair as prime minister on 27 June 2007. Brown launched his campaign website the same day as formally announcing his bid for leadership, titled "Gordon Brown for Britain". On 16 May, Channel 4 News announced that Andrew MacKinlay had nominated Brown, giving him 308 nominations—enough to avoid a leadership contest. A BBC report states that the decisive nomination was made by Tony Wright with MacKinlay yet to nominate at that point. Following Blair's announcement of his resignation and Brown's bid for leadership, the Labour Party rose in popularity in the polls, gaining three points after months of low polls and trailing behind the opposition Conservative Party. However, Labour subsequently lost this lead.

After Blair tendered his resignation to Queen Elizabeth II, Brown was invited by the Queen to form a government and become prime minister. After accepting the Queen's invitation to form a government, Brown and his wife Sarah Brown were driven from Buckingham Palace to Downing Street. In his first speech as prime minister, Brown said "This will be a new government with new priorities and I have been privileged to have been granted the great opportunity to serve my country. And at all times I will be strong in purpose, steadfast in will, resolute in action, in the service of what matters to the British people, meeting the concerns and aspirations of our whole country."

== Core policies ==
Brown was careful not to imply that there would be any reversals in the key areas of Blair's social policy, or any radical breakaway from New Labour. He did propose a different style of government than that of Blair's much-criticised 'presidential-style' government. Brown was unclear on certain parts of his policies, but he said that a Brown-led government would introduce the following;:

- Sleaze-busting package: Following the cash for honours scandal, Brown said he would reduce sleaze, which led to the belief that Brown would introduce a new Ministerial Code that would set out clear standards of behaviour for ministers. Brown said that he intended to strip the Prime Minister of some the powers conferred on it by royal prerogative—including the ability to declare war. This would give Parliament more powers and rights to vet and veto appointments to senior public positions, in a bid to eliminate cronyism.
- Environment: Brown pledged to make Britain a "world leader" in combating climate change; there would be large cuts in carbon emissions that were bigger than those of most developed nations.
- Constitutional reform: Brown did not clarify whether he proposed a written constitution—something the UK has never had—or a looser bill of rights. He said when announcing his bid that he wanted a "better constitution" that was "clear about the rights and responsibilities of being a citizen in Britain today". He planned to set up an all-party convention which would consider new powers for Parliament and the rebalancing of powers between Whitehall and local government. Brown also said that he would allow Parliament to decide whether British troops are sent into action.
- Housing: It was suggested that House Planning restrictions could be relaxed. Brown said that he wanted to release more land and make house ownership easier with shared equity schemes. He backed a proposal to build five eco-towns, each housing between 10,000 and 20,000 people—up to 100,000 new homes.
- Health: Brown said he wanted doctors' surgeries to open at weekends, and GPs to be on-call in the evenings. Doctors had been given the right to opt out of out-of-hours care two years before under a controversial pay deal signed by then-Health Secretary John Reid, that awarded them a 22 per cent pay rise in 2006. Lord Ara Darzi was appointed to review NHS service delivery, especially in London. Proposed policies included the induction of polyclinics, which would be open to tender and possibly run by private companies.
- Foreign policy: Brown remained committed to the Iraq War, but said that he would "learn the lessons" from mistakes made in Iraq. He remained supportive of American policies but said that he wanted a "solid but not slavish" relationship with the US.
- SOCPA: Brown intended to repeal sections 132 to 137 of the Serious Organised Crime and Police Act 2005, thereby enabling protest within the area around Parliament without prior permission from the Metropolitan Police.
- ID cards: Brown's campaign manager had said that one of Blair's unpopular key policies would be reviewed. The cost of the £5.5 billion identity card scheme was rapidly increasing. However, Brown said on 12 May that he would continue with it.
- Europe: Brown supported the EU Reform Treaty and repeatedly dismissed calls for a referendum on the issue.

== First acts as prime minister ==
On his first day in office, Brown rescinded the Order in Council which gave his predecessor's political advisers Alastair Campbell—who left office in 2003—and Jonathan Powell, authority to issue instructions to civil servants. Brown's senior advisers, including Spencer Livermore, Sue Nye, Mike Ellam and Gavin Kelly, continued to exert considerable influence on the government. Brown's other senior advisers included former Treasury Special Advisers Damian McBride, Jonathan Ashworth and Jo Dipple, and former senior Labour Party official Fiona Gordon.

Brown faced a major prime-ministerial challenge two days after entering office, when two unexploded car bombs were discovered in London on 29 June. The following day, a car was driven into the entrance of the main terminal of Glasgow International Airport in a second apparent terrorist attack, causing a fire and considerable damage to the building. Brown was born in Glasgow, leading to speculation that the attacks were motivated against him. As a result of both the London and Glasgow incidents, Brown chaired emergency COBRA meetings to review plans to protect the British public. He also spoke to the First Minister of Scotland Alex Salmond regarding the incidents.

On 3 July, Brown announced a programme of constitutional reforms, including limits to the powers of the prime minister, extensions to the powers of Parliament, a consultation on a bill of rights and a possible lowering of the minimum voting age. On 7 July 2007, he announced £14m in aid for the flood-hit areas in the north of England. On 11 July, Brown announced that housing would be at the top of his political agenda, promising that three million new homes would be built by 2020.

== Domestic reforms ==
The minimum statutory entitlement for paid holidays was increased from 4.8 to 5.6 weeks per annum, and Child Benefit was disregarded in calculating income for Housing and Council Tax Benefit as a means of improving work incentives and the incomes of many low-income families. Parents with children up to the age of 16 were given the statutory right to request flexible working arrangements.

Extra penalties for employers paying wages below the national minimum were introduced, while the September Guarantee was extended to 17-year-olds in 2008. The Mortgage Repossessions (Protection of Tenants Etc.) Act of 2010 created protection for unauthorised tenants. The Marine and Coastal Access Act 2009 granted new powers to tackle erosion and "underwrote a path to run round England's coastland", while the Community Energy Saving Programme (2009) obliged energy suppliers and generators to deliver energy efficiency measures in certain low income areas.

Compulsory personal, social and health education was introduced in 2009. The Additional Paternity Leave Regulations 2010 provided parents with the option to split the year's maternity leave the mother could then take from her employment, allowing parents greater flexibility with childcare arrangements. An extension of 10–15 hours free nursery provision for disadvantaged 2-year-olds was also carried out. Between 2008 and 2010, additional money was put into tax credits for families with children, while child poverty fell during Brown's last year as prime minister.

The Education and Skills Act 2008 introduced measures to extend educational opportunities and raised the school-leaving age to 18, while the Apprenticeships, Skills, Children and Learning Act 2009 introduced a statutory framework for apprenticeships and the right to an apprenticeship for suitably qualified 16- to 18-year-olds. The Housing and Regeneration Act 2008 created a new Homes and Communities Agency tasked with improving the supply and quality of housing in England. The Concessionary Bus Travel Act 2007 entitled disabled people and those past retirement age to free travel on local buses at off-peak times anywhere in England. The Pensions Act 2007 and the Pensions Act 2008 introduced improvements to pension provisions, while the Employment Act 2008 strengthened existing legislation governing working conditions.

Brown promised free prescription cancer medicines, which became available in January 2009, although concerns were raised in September that year that many patients entitled to such prescriptions were not benefiting from them. A Health in Pregnancy Grant which provided financial assistance to expectant mothers was also introduced. In 2008, a Local Housing Allowance for people on low incomes or on benefits who were renting from private landlords was introduced.

The Autism Act 2009 was passed to improve services and support for adults with autism. The Agency Workers Regulations 2010 was intended to improve the workplace rights of people working for employment agencies. The Equality Act 2010 required equal treatment in access to employment, private and public services. The Child Poverty Act 2010 set targets for governments to eliminate child poverty.

== "Government of All the Talents" ==
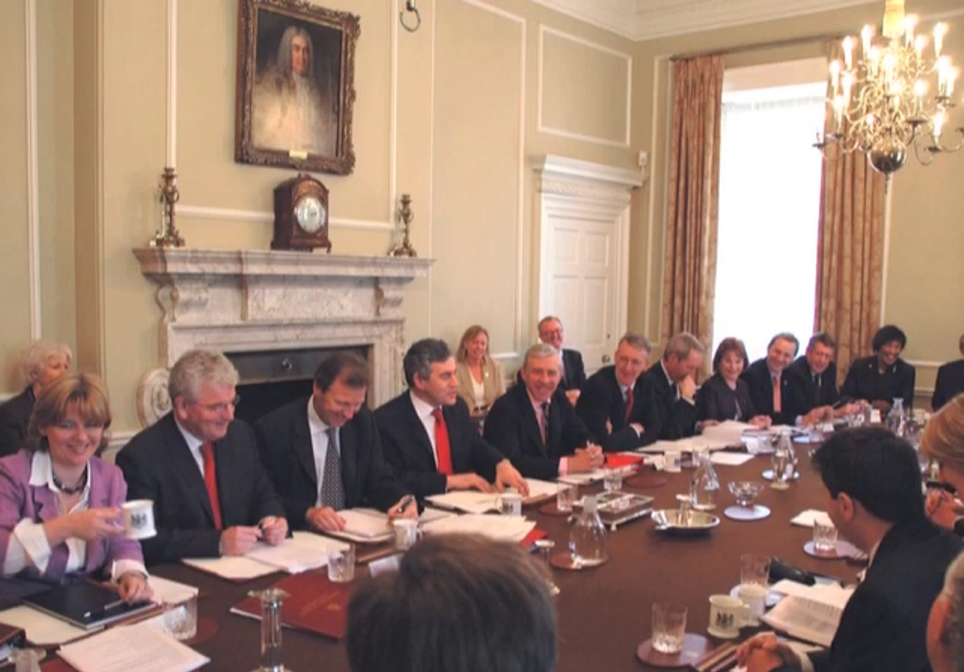
Brown chairing the first meeting of his cabinet.

Brown appointed his first cabinet in the first few days of his premiership. David Miliband was appointed Foreign Secretary while Alistair Darling succeeded Brown as Chancellor of the Exchequer. Brown's team also included Jacqui Smith, who became Britain's first female Home Secretary. Jack Straw was appointed to the new role of Secretary of State for Justice. Brown advocated a "Government of All the Talents" (GOAT) in which people who had not previously been members of the Labour Party but had expertise in specific areas would be appointed as ministers. Consequently, five new ministers were appointed, including Sir Ara Darzi—a consultant surgeon who became a health minister in the House of Lords, Sir Digby Jones—a former director general of the CBI who became minister of state for trade and investment and Sir Alan West—the former head of the Royal Navy who became a security minister at the Home Office.

== Foreign policy ==
Brown's first overseas trip as prime minister was to Berlin, where he spoke with German chancellor Angela Merkel.

In a speech to the Labour Friends of Israel in April 2007, Brown—whose father was the chairman of the Church of Scotland's Israel Committee —spoke of his long-standing interest in Israel and the Jewish community. He said that he "had a very clear view from household slides and projectors about the history of Israel, about the trials and tribulations of the Jewish people, about the enormous suffering and loss during the Holocaust, as well as the extraordinary struggle that he described to me of people to create this magnificent homeland".

Brown did not attend the opening ceremony of the 2008 Summer Olympics on 8 August 2008 in Beijing, and instead attended the closing ceremony on 24 August 2008. Brown had been under intense pressure from human rights campaigners to send a message to China, concerning the 2008 Tibetan unrest. His decision not to attend the opening ceremony was not an act of protest; the decision was made several weeks in advance of the Games.

=== Diplomatic relationship with the United States ===
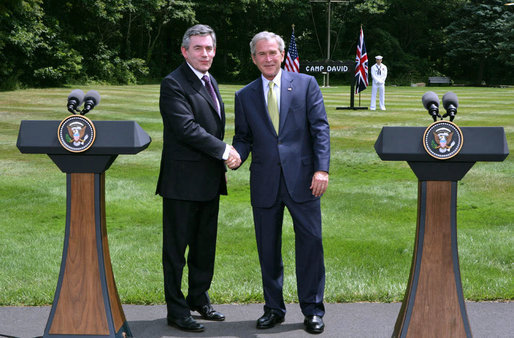
Brown with President George W. Bush at Camp David in 2007

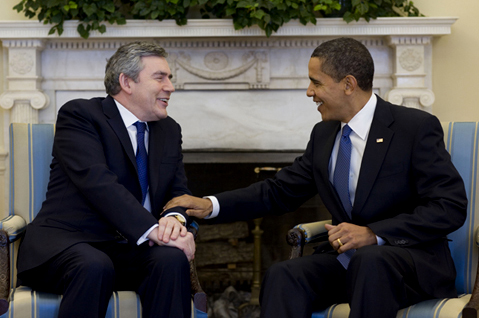
Brown with President Barack Obama at the White House Oval Office in 2009

There was widespread speculation on the nature of the UK's relationship with the US under Brown's government. Brown's close aide Douglas Alexander said in a Washington D.C speech, "In the 21st century, strength should be measured on what we can build together ... we need to demonstrate by our deeds, words and our actions that we are internationalist, not isolationist, multilateralist, not unilateralist, active and not passive, and driven by core values, consistently applied, not special interests". This was widely reported as both a policy shift and a message to the US.

However, Downing Street's spokesman strongly denied the suggestion that Alexander was trying to distance Britain from US foreign policy and show that Britain would not necessarily, in Tony Blair's words, stand "shoulder to shoulder" with George W. Bush over future military interventions. The spokesman said, "I thought the interpretation that was put on Douglas Alexander's words was quite extraordinary. To interpret this as saying anything at all about our relationship with the U.S. is nonsense."

Brown personally clarified his position. He said, "We will not allow people to separate us from the United States of America in dealing with the common challenges that we face around the world. I think people have got to remember that the relationship between Britain and America and between a British prime minister and an American president is built on the things that we share, the same enduring values about the importance of liberty, opportunity, the dignity of the individual. I will continue to work, as Tony Blair did, very closely with the American administration."

=== European Union ===
Brown continued to be dogged by controversy about not holding a referendum on the EU Treaty of Lisbon. On the morning of 13 December 2007, Foreign Secretary David Miliband stood in for Brown at the official signing ceremony in Lisbon of the EU Reform Treaty, which was attended by all other European heads of government. At the time, Brown was appearing before the Liaison Committee; he went to Portugal to sign the treaty that afternoon. Brown was criticised by opponents on both sides of the House and in the press. His critics said that neither Brown nor Labour had a mandate to ratify the treaty without public consent. Conservative leader David Cameron pointed to Labour's 2005 manifesto, which had pledged to give the British public a referendum on the original EU Constitution. Brown said the Treaty differed on significant points from the Constitution and was no longer a constitution but an ordinary treaty, and as such did not require a referendum. Most notably the Supremacy Clause was removed and replaced with a substantially weaker declaration. He also responded with plans for a lengthy debate on the topic and stated that he believed the document to be too complex to be decided by referendum.

=== Iraq Inquiry ===
Brown remained committed to the Iraq War, but said in June 2007 that he would learn from the mistakes made in Iraq. Brown said in a letter published on 17 March 2008 that the UK would eventually hold an inquiry into the war. The Iraq Inquiry was announced on 15 June 2009; Brown said that it would investigate the UK's role in the Iraq War and would be held in camera, a decision which was subsequently changed. Brown stated, "no British documents and no British witness will be beyond the scope of the inquiry". The announcement and nature of the inquiry were widely criticised. David Cameron dismissed the inquiry as "an establishment stitch-up", and the Liberal Democrats threatened a boycott. The open sessions of the inquiry began on 24 November 2009 and were televised from the Queen Elizabeth II Conference Centre.

On 5 March 2010, Gordon Brown appeared before the inquiry. In a four-hour hearing he told the inquiry that he believed the war had been "right" and that intelligence briefings had convinced him that Iraq was a threat that "had to be dealt with". He said that his predecessor Tony Blair had kept him informed despite Blair not being aware of some developments and that the main issue which concerned him was that Iraq was in breach of UN resolutions. He feared the "new world order we were trying to create would be put at risk" if the international community did not act together to deal with Iraq. When asked about equipment, Brown said that British troops in Iraq had all the equipment they needed. The BBC's political editor Nick Robinson said, "Gordon Brown's aim today appears to be to look and sound different from Tony Blair whilst simultaneously opening up no gap of substance with him and the decisions he took".

In 2017, Brown revised his assessment of the Iraq War following a leak of US military documents, explaining in his memoir My Life, Our Times that the "war could not be justified" given the lack of Weapons of Mass Destruction in Iraq prior to the 2003 invasion.

=== Gurkha settlement rights ===
On 24 April 2009, the Brown government announced a long-awaited decision on Gurkhas' rights to settle in the UK, leading to criticism of its decision to apply five criteria to any Gurkha soldier applying for British citizenship. On 29 April 2009, with the support of both opposition parties and Labour rebel MPs a Liberal Democrat motion that all Gurkhas be offered an equal right of residence was passed, allowing Gurkhas who served before 1997 to live in the UK. Following the Government defeat, the Minister for Immigration Phil Woolas announced that a further review would be completed by the middle of July. This was followed by a high-profile campaign by actress Joanna Lumley, which included a meeting with Brown at 10 Downing Street and a confrontation with Phil Woolas at the BBC Westminster studios, leading to an impromptu press conference in which she pressured Woolas into further talks over the issue. Finally, after a Commons Home Affairs Committee meeting between campaigners, the Ministry of Defence and the Home Office on 19 May, Brown announced to the House of Commons on 20 May that the home secretary Jacqui Smith would make a statement on the issue the following day. Smith subsequently announced that all Gurkha veterans who had served four years or more in the British Army before 1997 would be allowed to settle in Britain.

=== Release of Abdelbaset al-Megrahi ===
In the days following the release and high-profile return to Libya of Lockerbie bomber Abdelbaset al-Megrahi in August 2009, speculation about the possible involvement of the UK Government in the Scottish Government's decision to release him grew, particularly after Saif Gaddafi, the son of Libyan leader Colonel Gaddafi, said that Megrahi's case had been discussed during business talks with the UK, and after Colonel Gaddafi thanked Brown for "encouraging" the release. This prompted Downing Street to confirm that Brown had discussed a possible release with Gaddafi during the G8 summit in Italy in July 2009, but that a letter sent by Brown to the Libyan leader had stated, "When we met I stressed that, should the Scottish Government decide that Megrahi can return to Libya, this should be a purely private, family occasion".

On 16 August 2009, The Financial Times reported that Business Secretary, Peter Mandelson had met with Saif Gaddafi a week before Megrahi's release, and that a possible release had been discussed. Mandelson confirmed this, but said that he had told Gaddafi that any release was a matter for the Scottish justice secretary. Saif Gaddafi told Libyan television the discussion was part of a wider conversation about a trade deal involving Libyan oil and gas, but Mandelson described suggestions that a release had been linked to a trade deal with Libya as "offensive".

== Financial policy ==
=== Banking crisis ===
On 14 September 2007, the Northern Rock Bank sought and received a liquidity support facility from the Bank of England, following problems in the credit markets during the 2008 financial crisis. The government took Northern Rock into public ownership in February 2008 as a result of its financial problems caused by the subprime mortgage crisis.

The global recession grew steadily worse throughout 2008, and saw large falls in the stock market at the beginning of October when Britain's leading share index, the FTSE100, recorded its largest single-day points fall since 1987. On 8 October, in response to the crisis, the government announced a bank rescue package of £500 billion; approximately US$850 billion. The plan aimed to restore market confidence, help stabilise the British banking system and provide for a range of short-term loans and guarantees of interbank lending, and up to £50 billion of state investment in the banks themselves. Paul Krugman, the Nobel prize-winning economist, said that Brown "defined the character of the worldwide financial rescue effort".

=== Recession and fiscal stimulus ===
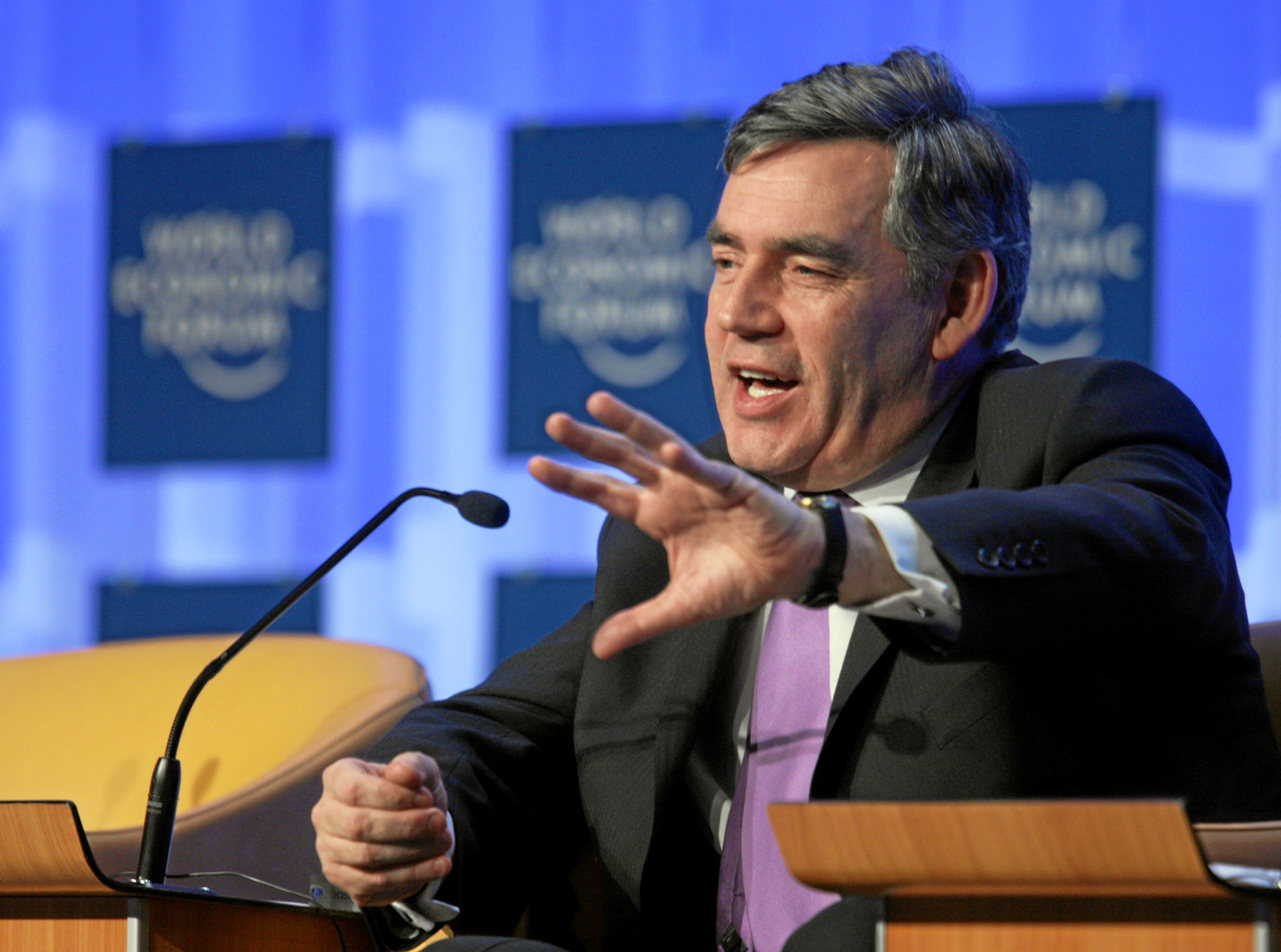
Brown at the Annual Meeting 2008 of the World Economic Forum in Davos, Switzerland

With the onset of the recession, the UK government led calls to stimulate aggregate demand. Throughout 2008, a number of fiscal measures—including a £145 tax cut for basic rate (below £34,800 pa earnings) tax payers, a temporary 2.5% cut in Value-added tax (VAT), £3 billion worth of spending brought forward from 2010 and a £20 billion Small Enterprise Loan Guarantee Scheme—were introduced. The cost of these measures, most of which were announced in the November 2008 Pre-Budget Report, was about £20 billion excluding counting loan guarantees. Further measures worth £5 billion—including training for the young unemployed and a car scrappage scheme which offered a £2,000 subsidy for the purchase of a new car in exchange for the scrapping of a car more than 10 years old—were announced in the 2009 budget.

Despite entering the crisis with a low level of public debt—roughly 40% of GDP—and a moderate deficit compared to many European nations, the UK's ability to take discretionary fiscal action was limited by the burden of bank bail-outs on public finances. The tax revenue from financial services, which was conservatively estimated at 13.9% of UK tax income in 2007, fell alarmingly as the crisis affected bank profits. This contributed to a significant rise in the deficit to an estimated £175 billion (12.4% of GDP) in 2009–10 and a rise in the national debt to above 80% of GDP at its peak. The UK had significant automatic stabilisers which contributed far more than discretionary action and more than most other countries.

=== 2009 pre-Budget report ===
On 9 December, in his final pre-Budget report before the 2010 general election, Chancellor Alistair Darling said that the recession had been deeper than predicted during the Budget in April, and that the government's programme of quantitative easing had made a "real difference" to families and businesses. He also announced measures to help economic recovery, including a public sector pay freeze, a levy on bank bonuses and a package of measures to help the unemployed. He said the country must choose "between securing the recovery or wrecking it". Darling also said that the UK's total net debt would continue to rise until the financial year 2014–15. Borrowing would reach 56% of GDP in 2009–10 and peak at 78% in 2014–15; later than previously forecast and in line with other G7 economies.

The measures would see tax increases for a large section of the population. Shadow Chancellor George Osborne said that Labour should "never be trusted" with people's money again, while Labour was also accused of electioneering after Darling announced a 1.5 per cent rise in Child Benefit and Disability Living Allowance from April 2010—weeks ahead of an expected election—but made no comment on whether the rise could be sustained after April 2011. Labour was also criticised because it had delayed vital spending decisions until after the general election. Darling said on Radio 4's Today programme the following day that he had not carried out a full spending review because of continued economic uncertainty. He said that he had announced he was over-riding the normal requirement to link the rise in benefits to the previous September's rate of inflation; the benefits would have effectively been frozen because inflation was negative at that point. Later the same day, Brown also said that the announcement had not been a pre-election stunt.

in December 2009, the Institute for Fiscal Studies (IFS) estimated that there would be a public spending shortfall of £36 billion in the three years from 2011—with £15 billion of the cuts needed yet to be identified. The country's leading economic think tank forecast that with spending on health and education protected, defence, housing, transport and higher education would be the most likely areas to be cut. The IFS also estimated that the cost to each family of paying back the national debt would be £2,400 a year for eight years. On 11 December, the BBC reported that the Treasury had wanted a tougher approach to public spending to lend credibility to its plan to cut the deficit, but that Brown had over-ruled it following an aggressive campaign for a real-terms increase in education spending by Schools Minister Ed Balls. Brown said the report was "completely wrong".

== Military covenant ==
In November 2007, several former Chiefs of Defence—including General Lord Guthrie, Admiral Lord Boyce, Marshal of the Royal Air Force Lord Craig, Field Marshal Lord Bramall and Field Marshal Lord Inge—criticised Brown for departing from the military covenant, a convention within British politics stating that in exchange for risking their lives for the sake of national security, members of the armed forces should be suitably looked after by the government. Brown was accused by senior opposition politicians, including Conservative leader David Cameron, and Nick Clegg of the Liberal Democrats of failing to provide proper support for soldiers and their families.

== 42-day detention ==
Following the rejection of a previous bill under Tony Blair's government to allow the detention of terror suspects for up to 90 days without charge, Brown championed a new bill extending the pre-charge detention period to 42 days. The bill was opposed on both sides of the House and Brown was facing a growing backbench rebellion. Jenny Percival wrote in The Guardian that Brown's critics accused him of "vote-buying" to ensure he won the vote on this issue. The bill was passed by nine votes, with Brown relying on the support of Conservative MP Ann Widdecombe and a handful of Democratic Unionist MPs.

In a session of Prime Minister's Questions some weeks later, David Cameron challenged Brown to concede on record that "no deals were done" in ensuring the bill was passed. Brown stood before the House and said, "yes". Cameron quoted from a letter written by Labour's chief whip Geoff Hoon to Keith Vaz—the chairman of the Home Affairs Committee—in which Hoon expressed deep thanks for Vaz's support and closed the letter with the line, "I trust that you will be appropriately rewarded". Hoon said that this was just a joke between friends but others, such as Conservative leader David Cameron and Shadow Home Secretary David Davis viewed this letter as proof that deals were indeed done behind the scenes and that Brown lied on the record when he said there had been none. The House of Lords defeated the bill, which Lords said was "fatally flawed, ill thought through and unnecessary", stating that "it seeks to further erode ... fundamental legal and civil rights".

== Leadership ==
=== The "election that never was" ===
Gordon Brown caused controversy during September and early October 2007 by letting speculation that he would call a snap general election continue. The Labour Party launched an advertising campaign, Not flash, just Gordon, which was seen largely as pre-election promotion of Brown as prime minister. Following the negative reaction to his visit to British troops in Iraq during the 2007 Conservative Party Conference, an unrehearsed conference speech made by David Cameron and an opinion poll showing Labour 6% behind the Conservative Party in key marginal seats, Brown announced that there would be no election in the near future. He was subsequently accused by his political opponents as being indecisive. Cameron accused Brown of "bottling" the election because of opinion polls, which Brown denied.

=== Plots against leadership ===
The first signs of internal disquiet towards Brown's policies surfaced in May 2008. The 2007 budget—his last as Chancellor—abolished the 10% income tax rate for the lowest earners (5.1 million people), increasing their rate to the next highest, 20%. Earners who fell within the 22% tax rate band had their rate reduced to 20%, and tax allowances were also made for over-65s. These measures came into effect in April 2008. The "10p tax rate cut" as it was commonly referred to, was sharply criticised by Frank Field and several other backbenchers. Field also said that Brown did not seem to be enjoying his job. Health Secretary Alan Johnson believed that Field was motivated primarily by a personal dislike of Brown, and Field later apologised, saying that he had regretted allowing his campaign to become personal. Chancellor Alistair Darling cut the tax rate for 22 million people and borrowed around £2.7 billion to reimburse those on lower and middle incomes who had suffered.

In mid-2008, a large number of senior MPs openly called upon Brown to resign. This event was dubbed the "Lancashire Plot"; two backbenchers from North West England urged Brown to step down and a third questioned his chances of holding on to the Labour Party leadership. Several MPs said that if Brown did not recover in the polls by early 2009, he should call for a leadership contest. However, prominent MPs—including Jacqui Smith and Bill Rammell—said that Brown was the right person to lead Britain through its economic crisis.

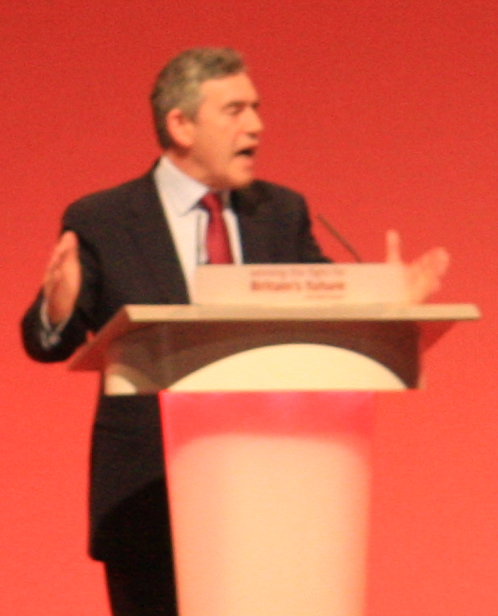
Brown at the Labour Party Conference in 2008

A second assault upon Brown's premiership was launched in September 2008 when Siobhain McDonagh—an MP who had never voted against the government—spoke of the need for discussion over Brown's position. McDonagh, a junior government whip, was sacked from her role on 12 September. McDonagh did not state that she wanted Brown deposed, but she implored the Labour Party to hold a leadership election. McDonagh spoke of a "huge number" of Labour MPs who wanted a leadership election. In the following days, several Labour MPs—including Field, Joan Ryan (who applied, as McDonagh had, for leadership nomination papers, and became the second rebel to be fired from her job), Jim Dowd, Greg Pope, and others who had previously held positions in government—said they wanted a contest. In an unrelated incident, 12 backbenchers signed a letter criticising Brown that was published in Progress magazine. One of these MPs, Eric Joyce, said that Brown's future hinged on his performance at the upcoming Labour Party Conference.

A Downing Street source responded to these incidents by stating, "The Blairites have been talking up the idea of loads of ministers resigning. But the best they can come up with is an assistant government whip". Tony Lloyd, chairman of the parliamentary Labour Party, called the rebellion a "bit of a sideshow", and Emily Thornberry MP called Brown the "best qualified" to lead Britain through the economic crisis of 2008. The Labour Party said that it had received letters from a small number of MPs asking why no nomination papers had been released. David Miliband continued to show his support for Brown in the face of the challenge in September, as did Business Secretary John Hutton, Environment Secretary Hilary Benn, and Chief Whip Geoff Hoon.

Despite growing speculation over Brown's future, most of his ministers wanted him to lead the party. Harriet Harman and Foreign Secretary David Miliband said they were not preparing leadership bids. After Labour lost the Glasgow East by-election in July, Harman—the deputy leader of the party—suppressed rumours regarding her intentions, saying that Brown was the "solution", not the "problem"; Home Secretary Jacqui Smith, Justice Secretary Jack Straw, Schools Secretary Ed Balls and Cabinet Office Minister Ed Miliband re-affirmed their support for Brown. The deputy prime minister under Blair, John Prescott, also pledged his support. David Miliband was then forced to deny that he was plotting a leadership bid; in July, an article written by him for The Guardian was interpreted by the media as an attempt to undermine Brown. In the article, Miliband outlined the party's future but did not mention the prime minister. Miliband was forced to quell rumours that he would run against Brown in a leadership election, adding that he was confident Brown could lead Labour to victory in the 2010 general election, and that his article was actually an attack against the fatalism that had dogged the party since the loss of Glasgow-East.

=== 2009 local and European elections ===
Labour suffered a historic defeat in the European elections, finishing third place behind the Conservatives and the UK Independence Party (UKIP). Voter apathy was evident in the historically low turnout of around 33%. In Scotland, voter turnout was only 28%. In the local elections, Labour finished third place behind the Conservatives and Liberal Democrats; Labour lost control of the four councils it had held prior to the election. The vote was widely considered to be a reaction to the expenses scandal; the share of the votes for all the major parties fell; Labour was down 1%, the Conservative share was down 5%. The minor parties, including the Green party and UKIP, were considered to have benefited from the public backlash against the major parties. Brown said that the results were "a painful defeat for Labour", and that "too many good people doing so much good for their communities and their constituencies have lost through no fault of their own".

The days leading up to the elections saw the resignations of several high-profile cabinet ministers. These included the Europe Minister Caroline Flint, Home Secretary Jacqui Smith, the Minister for Children Beverley Hughes, Secretary of State for Communities and Local Government Hazel Blears, and Work and Pensions Secretary James Purnell, who resigned minutes after the polls for the local and European elections had closed and sent a letter to the prime minister calling on him to step aside.

The results of the local elections were announced the following day; the remaining councils under Labour control all became Conservative-controlled. The projected national vote shares predicted that the Conservatives achieved 38% of the vote, the Liberal Democrats 28% and Labour 23%. In the aftermath of these results, Brown reshuffled his cabinet amidst some pressure on his leadership. Further pressure followed the results of the European parliamentary elections, which were announced on 7 June. These showed large declines in the Labour Party's vote. The far-right British National Party won seats in North West England and Yorkshire and the Humber—its first ever seats won in a national election.

All of these events led to mounting speculation about Brown's future as prime minister and a possible leadership challenge. However, Brown faced down his critics and was applauded at a meeting of the Parliamentary Labour Party on 8 June 2009. Brown continued to be unpopular; in September, Britain's biggest selling newspaper The Sun announced that after 12 years of supporting Labour, it would withdraw its support in favour of the Conservatives. A challenge to Brown's leadership was made in January 2010 when Patricia Hewitt and Geoff Hoon wrote to Labour MPs calling for a secret ballot on the issue. Their letter said that the party was "deeply divided" and the issue should be sorted out "once and for all". However, the plot failed to gather any momentum after several senior cabinet ministers spoke out in support of Brown.

=== Allegations of bullying ===
On 31 January 2010, The Mail on Sunday reported that a book, The End of the Party written by the journalist Andrew Rawnsley, would make allegations that Brown had flown into a series of rages and had physically attacked members of his staff. The claims were fiercely denied by Brown and his colleagues. In an interview with the television presenter Piers Morgan, Brown said, "I have never hit anybody in my life".

In February 2010 Christine Pratt, founder of the National Bullying Helpline said that the helpline had taken calls from Downing Street staff, although she later stated that the calls did not refer to Brown himself. This led to the resignations of three of the charity's patrons; Cary Cooper, Ann Widdecombe and Sarah Cawood. The Charity Commission later said that it had received over 160 complaints about the helpline's handling of the situation. The helpline service was voluntarily suspended; it resumed two days later.

== 2010 general election ==
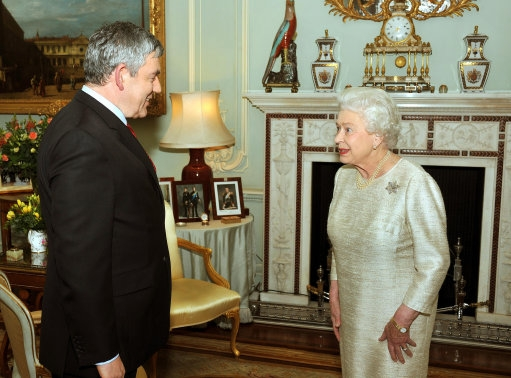
The Queen receiving Brown at Buckingham Palace where he officially tendered his resignation as Prime Minister, 2010

On 6 April 2010, Brown visited Buckingham Palace to seek the Queen's permission to dissolve Parliament on 12 April, initiating a general election on 6 May. He announced the election shortly afterwards and described it as the "least well-kept secret of recent years", since 6 May had been predicted as the most likely date for an election for some time. Brown unveiled Labour's election manifesto on 12 April under the party's election slogan "A future fair for all", saying that Labour had a "plan for the future". Key pledges in the manifesto included:

- No rise in the income tax rate during the next Parliament
- No extension of VAT to food and children's clothes
- A new global banks levy
- No stamp duty for first time buyers on homes below £250,000
- A pledge to raise the National Minimum Wage in line with earnings
- The right for constituents to recall MPs
- Referendums on a democratic House of Lords and proposed changes to the voting system
- Plans to double paternity leave from two weeks to four
- A pledge not to privatise Royal Mail during the next Parliament.

The main opposition parties were critical in their responses to the manifesto. The Conservative Party said that it would "change nothing", while the Liberal Democrats said that Labour would not reform tax and politics. Conservative leader David Cameron said, "There is nothing new there, there is nothing different there". Liberal Democrat leader Nick Clegg asked how Labour could deliver "fairness and new politics" when they had promised the same at previous general elections but had failed to do so.

The election campaign saw the UK's first televised debates between the leaders of the three main parties. While Cameron and Clegg were generally perceived to have performed well in these, Brown was perceived to have done less well. Brown also attracted criticism from the media after privately describing a 65-year-old pensioner as a "bigoted woman" after she stated that entitled people were not receiving benefits because non-entitled people are receiving them. She also expressed her displeasure at immigration from Eastern Europe. His remarks—said on 28 April whilst in a car with his staff—were picked up by a Sky News microphone he was still wearing following a visit to Rochdale and were widely broadcast.

At the election, Labour lost 91 seats in the House of Commons, but the Conservatives failed to achieve an overall majority, resulting in the first hung parliament since 1974. Under the constitution governing what happens in the event of a hung parliament, Brown remained temporarily as prime minister, while the Liberal Democrats and Conservatives entered into talks aimed at forming a coalition government. Talks between the Liberal Democrats and Labour also took place. On 10 May, Brown announced his intention to resign as leader of the Labour Party and instructed the party to initiate the election of a new leader. Brown's continued presence as prime minister was seen an obstacle to the negotiation of a Labour-Liberal Democrat deal. By 11 May, the possibility of a deal was becoming less likely as talks between the Conservatives and Liberal Democrats continued. Following a telephone conversation with his predecessor Tony Blair where Blair informed Brown that the election had shown that the British voters had lost faith in both him and the Labour Party and that the United Kingdom would not accept him continuing as prime minister. With this he concluded that he would not be able to form a government, and announced his resignation as prime minister. He also resigned as leader of the Labour Party with immediate effect. Brown travelled to Buckingham Palace and officially tendered his resignation to the Queen. Soon after Brown was succeeded as prime minister by David Cameron, while Harriet Harman became acting leader of the Labour Party. She stepped down after Ed Miliband became Labour leader and Brown's successor.

== Peter Mandelson and Jeffrey Epstein scandal ==
A major political scandal emerged over a decade after the end of Brown's premiership, amid the premiership of Keir Starmer, involving Peter Mandelson's friendship with child sex offender Jeffrey Epstein. Their friendship spanned at least from 2002 to 2011, continuing even after Epstein's first conviction in 2008. While their friendship had been public knowledge for some time, a fresh wave of scrutiny and public outrage erupted in September 2025 following the release of U.S. court documents and a cache of private emails between the two men by the U.S. House Oversight Committee, which ultimately led to Mandelson's dismissal as the British Ambassador to the United States and his resignation from the Labour Party and from the Lords.

The released documents revealed the depth and nature of their relationship, particularly after Epstein's 2008 conviction in Florida for soliciting prostitution from a minor. Among the most damaging early revelations were a 2003 birthday book message where Mandelson called Epstein his "best pal," and emails from 2008 where he expressed support for Epstein, told him he "thought the world of him," and advised him to "fight for early release" from his 18-month sentence. It also emerged that Epstein had paid for Mandelson's travel in 2003 and that Mandelson had reportedly sought Epstein's help with a banking deal while serving as a UK cabinet minister in 2010. In February 2026 there were further reports that Mandelson and his husband had received payments from Epstein, and that in 2009 and 2010 Mandelson allegedly passed government information to Epstein amid the 2008 financial crisis, while Mandelson was business secretary in the Brown ministry. Mandelson resigned from the Labour Party and from the Lords, and the Metropolitan Police launched a criminal investigation into alleged misconduct in a public office.

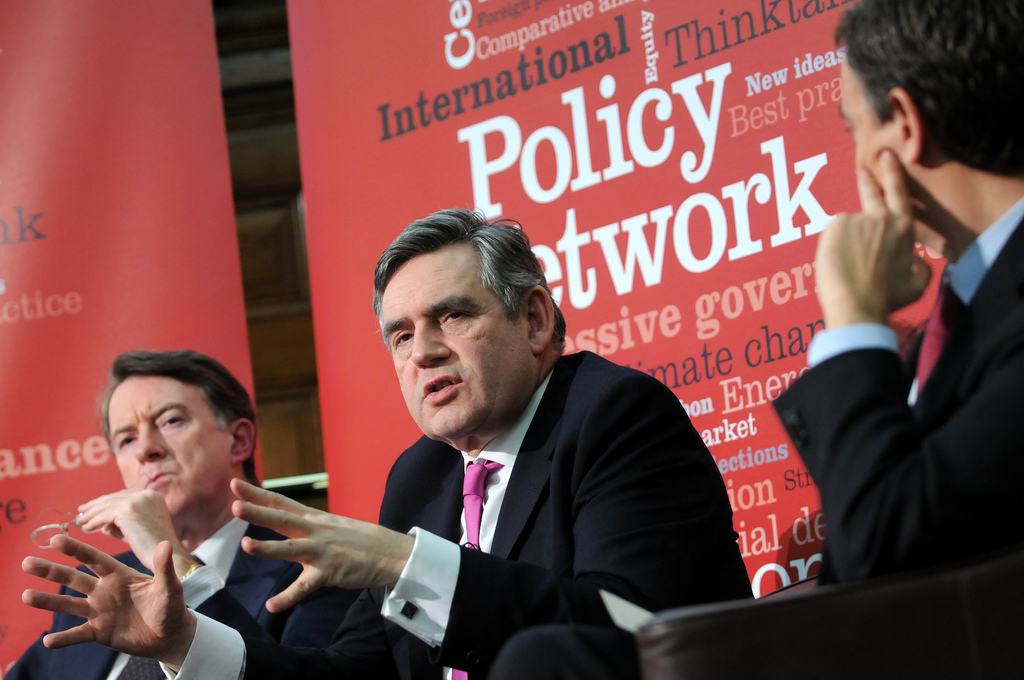
Brown issued a series of public condemnations of Mandelson and expressed deep personal revulsion and regret

On 13 June 2009, Mandelson allegedly leaked to Epstein a high-level Downing Street document that proposed £20bn of asset sales and revealed Labour's tax policy plans. The memo was written on 13 June 2009 by Nick Butler, who was a special adviser to Prime Minister Gordon Brown from 2009 to 2010. A December 2009 email from Mandelson appeared to suggest that JPMorgan Chase boss Jamie Dimon should "mildly threaten" Alistair Darling over a bankers' bonus tax; the pressure was reportedly exerted through references to the role of US banks as buyers of UK gilts, as well as investment plans in London. Epstein acted as a middleman, helping Dubai's DP World CEO Sultan Ahmed bin Sulayem lobby Mandelson—who had become the UK Business Secretary—for government support of the London Gateway port project.

On 31 March 2010, Mandelson allegedly forwarded confidential minutes of a meeting between Chancellor of the Exchequer Alistair Darling and the director of the U.S. National Economic Council, Larry Summers, five minutes after he received them, which discussed new banking regulation and taxation that Summers wanted to see, in addition to discussion on how the US should engage with France and Germany. The following day, 1 April 2010, Mandelson met with Larry Summers, and forwarded the minutes of his meeting two minutes after he received them. On 3 February 2026, London's Metropolitan Police announced that they would formally launch a criminal investigation into Mandelson. It was also reported that Mandelson had lobbied the Barack Obama administration in March 2010, to water down proposed restrictions on US bank trading activities, on behalf of Epstein and Jes Staley.

On 9 May 2010, Mandelson gave Epstein advance notice of a €500bn bailout from the EU to save the euro. On 10 May 2010, Mandelson emailed Epstein saying "finally got him to go today", with Brown resigning the following day. In another email on 10 May 2010, Mandelson appeared to reveal to Epstein the existence of a secret underground tunnel between 10 Downing Street and the Ministry of Defence.

=== Brown's response ===
In September 2025, Brown defended Prime Minister Keir Starmer in the wake of Mandelson's dismissal over his links to Epstein, and stated he believes that Starmer will be "completely exonerated" over the affair. In an interview with Sky News on 15 September 2025, Brown supported Starmer's handling of the crisis and suggested that the public ultimately cares more about policy than about political personalities and scandals. When asked if the situation was a lapse in Starmer's judgement, Brown acknowledged that it "calls somewhat into his judgement" but maintained that Starmer faced difficult decisions. He predicted that Starmer would be "completely exonerated" once the full record of events was revealed, comparing the scrutiny to situations he faced during his own premiership.

In February 2026, Brown issued a series of public condemnations of Mandelson following the release of US Department of Justice documents detailing Mandelson's relationship with Epstein. Writing in The Guardian and speaking on BBC Radio 4’s Today programme, Brown described Mandelson's alleged actions as a "betrayal of his country" and expressed deep personal revulsion and regret.

Brown specifically alleged that Mandelson "betrayed" the UK by leaking market-sensitive government information to Epstein during the 2008 global financial crisis, an act he claimed put the British currency at risk and could have caused "huge commercial damage". He admitted it was a "mistake" to bring Mandelson back into his Cabinet in 2008, stating he had been misled by reports that Mandelson's record as an EU Commissioner was "unblemished". In a Sky News interview, Brown described himself as feeling "shocked, sad, angry, betrayed, let down" by the email exchanges, which he characterized as a "systematic abuse of power" by a global network that believed it was above the law.

Furthermore, Brown defended Starmer, arguing that Starmer had been "misled and betrayed" by Mandelson during the vetting process for his US Ambassadorship. Brown proposed sweeping ethical reforms to address what he called a "systemic failure" in vetting, including US-style public confirmation hearings for senior appointments and the creation of an independent anti-corruption commission with statutory powers of search and seizure. He also noted that the leaked emails suggested Mandelson was planning a private-sector career and discussing potential jobs with banks while still serving as a government minister, which he called a "complete betrayal of his colleagues".

== See also ==
- Brownism
- Premiership of Tony Blair
- 2010s in United Kingdom political history
- Politics of the United Kingdom

British premierships
| Preceded by Blair | Brown premiership 2007–2010 | Succeeded by Cameron |
