= 2008 Rochdale Metropolitan Borough Council election =

2008 UK local government election

Elections to Rochdale Metropolitan Borough Council in Greater Manchester, England were held on 1 May 2008. One third of the council was up for election. The Liberal Democrats stayed in control of the council after gaining seats in Balderstone and Kirkholt, and North Heywood from the Labour Party but losing East Middleton back to Labour.

After the election, the composition of the council was:

- Liberal Democrat 33
- Labour 19
- Conservative 8

== Election result ==
Rochdale local election result 2007
Party	Seats	Gains	Losses	Net gain/loss	Seats %	Votes %	Votes	+/−
Liberal Democrats	11	2	1	+1	50.0	36.1	18,572	-2.4
Labour	5	1	2	-1	40.0	31.3	16,109	-4.4
Conservative	4	0	0	0	10.0	30.5	15,701	+5.2
BNP	0	0	0	0	0.0	0.8	421	+0.8
Independent	0	0	0	0	0.0	1.2	637	+0.7

== Ward results ==
=== Balderstone and Kirkholt ward ===
Balderstone and Kirkholt ward
Party	Candidate	Votes	%	±%
Liberal Democrats	Pat Colclough	821	36.7%	−8.7
Labour	Darren Pedley	760	33.9%	−6.2
Conservative	Ian Duckworth	658	29.4%	+14.9
Majority		61	2.7	−2.6
Turnout		2,239		
Liberal Democrats gain from Labour		Swing		

=== Bamford ward ===
Bamford ward
Party	Candidate	Votes	%	±%
Conservative	Jane Gartside	1,766	56.2	+11.3
Liberal Democrats	Mohammed Shafiq	988	31.4	−13.8
Labour	Ben "Timmy Howard" Robertson	388	12.3	+2.5
Majority		778	24.8	
Turnout		3,142		
Conservative hold		Swing		

=== Castleton ward ===
Castleton ward
Party	Candidate	Votes	%	±%
Liberal Democrats	Pat Flynn	1,386	55.7	+2.2
Labour	Jean Hornby	637	25.6	+3.5
Conservative	Ronnie Crossley	467	18.8	−4.6
Majority		749	30.0	−1.4
Turnout		2,490		
Liberal Democrats hold		Swing		

=== Central Rochdale ward ===
Central Rochdale ward
Party	Candidate	Votes	%	±%
Liberal Democrats	Zulfiqar Ali	1,869	51.9	+11.9
Labour	Daalat Ali	1,422	39.5	−11.6
Conservative	Roger Howarth	309	8.6	−0.3
Majority		447	12.4	
Turnout		3,600		
Liberal Democrats hold		Swing		

=== East Middleton ward ===
East Middleton ward
Party	Candidate	Votes	%	±%
Labour	Malcolm Boriss	1,030	48.0	+1.1
Conservative	John Cardus	625	29.1	+10.9
Liberal Democrats	Irene Cooper	492	22.9	−11.2
Majority		405	18.9	+6.0
Turnout		2,147		
Labour gain from Liberal Democrats		Swing		

=== Healey ward ===
Healey ward
Party	Candidate	Votes	%	±%
Liberal Democrats	Tom Bailey	1,214	45.7%	−4.4
Conservative	Andrew Neilson	920	34.6%	+5.1
Labour	Phillip Bethell	525	19.7%	−0.7
Majority		294	11.1%	−9.6
Turnout		2,659		
Liberal Democrats hold		Swing		

=== Hopwood Hall ward ===
Hopwood Hall ward
Party	Candidate	Votes	%	±%
Labour	Linda Robinson	1,325	53.7	−7.7
Conservative	Keith Taylor	761	30.8	+2.7
Liberal Democrats	Harry Boota	382	15.5	+5.0
Majority		564	22.8	−10.5
Turnout		2,468		
Labour hold		Swing		

=== Kingsway ward ===
Kingsway ward
Party	Candidate	Votes	%	±%
Liberal Democrats	David Clayton	1,245	46.5%	+1.8
Labour	Tom Stott	1,116	41.7%	+0.7
Conservative	Phil Grantham	314	11.7%	−2.0
Majority		129	4.8	+1.6
Turnout		2,675		
Liberal Democrats hold		Swing		

=== Littleborough Lakeside ward ===
Littleborough Lakeside ward
Party	Candidate	Votes	%	±%
Liberal Democrats	Peter Evans	1,086	44.8	+3.4
Conservative	Andrew Jones	1001	41.3	+2.8
Labour	John Hartley	335	13.8	−6.3
Majority		85	3.5	+0.6
Turnout		2,422		
Liberal Democrats hold		Swing		

=== Milkstone and Deeplish ward ===
Milkstone and Deeplish ward
Party	Candidate	Votes	%	±%
Liberal Democrats	Mohammed Sharif	1,872	53.7	+7.3
Labour	Ghulam Shahzad	796	22.9	−25.6
Independent	Javed Iqbal	637	18.3	+18.3
Conservative	Sue Pawson	178	5.1	+0.0
Majority		1,076	30.8	
Turnout		3,483		
Liberal Democrats hold		Swing		

=== Milnrow and Newhey ward ===
Milnrow and Newhey ward
Party	Candidate	Votes	%	±%
Liberal Democrats	Irene Davidson	1,193	48.2	−9.4
Conservative	Michael Butler	663	26.8	−0.7
Labour	Debbie Abrahams	620	25.0	+10.1
Majority		530	21.4	−8.7
Turnout		2,476		
Liberal Democrats hold		Swing		

=== Norden ward ===
Norden ward
Party	Candidate	Votes	%	±%
Conservative	James Gartside	1,450	48.0	+1.9
Liberal Democrats	Hilary Rodgers	874	28.9	−14.1
BNP	Peter Greenwood	421	13.9	+13.9
Labour	Anthony Bennett	278	9.2	−1.7
Majority		576	19.0	+15.9
Turnout		3,023		
Conservative hold		Swing		

=== North Heywood ward ===
North Heywood ward
Party	Candidate	Votes	%	±%
Liberal Democrats	Malcolm Bruce	936	44.8	+1.3
Labour	Susan Coates	799	38.3	−2.4
Conservative	Darren Bayman	353	16.9	+1.1
Majority		137	6.6	+3.8
Turnout		2,088		
Liberal Democrats gain from Labour		Swing		

=== North Middleton ward ===
North Middleton ward
Party	Candidate	Votes	%	±%
Labour	Maureen Rowbotham	746	42.3	−9.1
Conservative	David Harris	537	30.4	−0.4
Liberal Democrats	Rhoda Morley	481	27.3	+9.5
Majority		209	11.8	−8.8
Turnout		1,764		
Labour hold		Swing		

=== Smallbridge and Firgrove ward ===
Smallbridge and Firgrove ward
Party	Candidate	Votes	%	±%
Liberal Democrats	Jean Ashworth	1,053	45.7	+1.8
Labour	Amna Mir	841	36.5	−1.6
Conservative	Len Branton	412	17.9	−0.2
Majority		212	9.2	+3.5
Turnout		2,306		
Liberal Democrats hold		Swing		

=== South Middleton ward ===
South Middleton ward
Party	Candidate	Votes	%	±%
Conservative	Teresa Fitzsimons	1,713	58.4	+15.4
Labour	John Orford	993	33.8	−11.0
Liberal Democrats	Neil Lever	228	7.8	−4.4
Majority		720	24.6	
Turnout		2,934		
Conservative hold		Swing		

=== Spotland and Falinge ward ===
Spotland and Falinge ward
Party	Candidate	Votes	%	±%
Liberal Democrats	Barbara Todd	1,304	44.9	−10.1
Labour	Surinder Biant	1,151	39.6	+6.6
Conservative	Steven Scholes	452	15.5	+3.6
Majority		153	5.3	−16.7
Turnout		2,907		
Liberal Democrats hold		Swing		

=== Wardle and West Littleborough ward ===
Wardle and West Littleborough ward
Party	Candidate	Votes	%	±%
Conservative	Ashley Dearnley	2,157	80.4	+12.6
Liberal Democrats	Andy Kelly	264	9.8	−9.4
Labour	Mike Radanovic	263	9.8	−3.2
Majority		1,893	70.5	+21.9
Turnout		2,684	30.1%	8.8%
Conservative hold		Swing		

=== West Heywood ward ===
West Heywood ward
Party	Candidate	Votes	%	±%
Labour	Colin Lambert	1,087	53.3	−2.7
Conservative	John Kershaw	541	26.5	+4.2
Liberal Democrats	George Kinder	410	20.1	−1.6
Majority		546	26.8	−6.9
Turnout		2,038		
Labour hold		Swing		

=== West Middleton ward ===
West Middleton ward
Party	Candidate	Votes	%	±%
Labour	Lil Murphy	997	52.6	+0.9
Liberal Democrats	Terry Smith	474	25.0	−8.4
Conservative	Dave Pawson	424	22.4	+7.5
Majority		523	27.6	+9.3
Turnout		1,895		
Labour hold		Swing		
