= 1995 Littleborough and Saddleworth by-election =

UK parliamentary by-election

← 1992	27 July 1995	1997 →
- Turnout: 64.5%
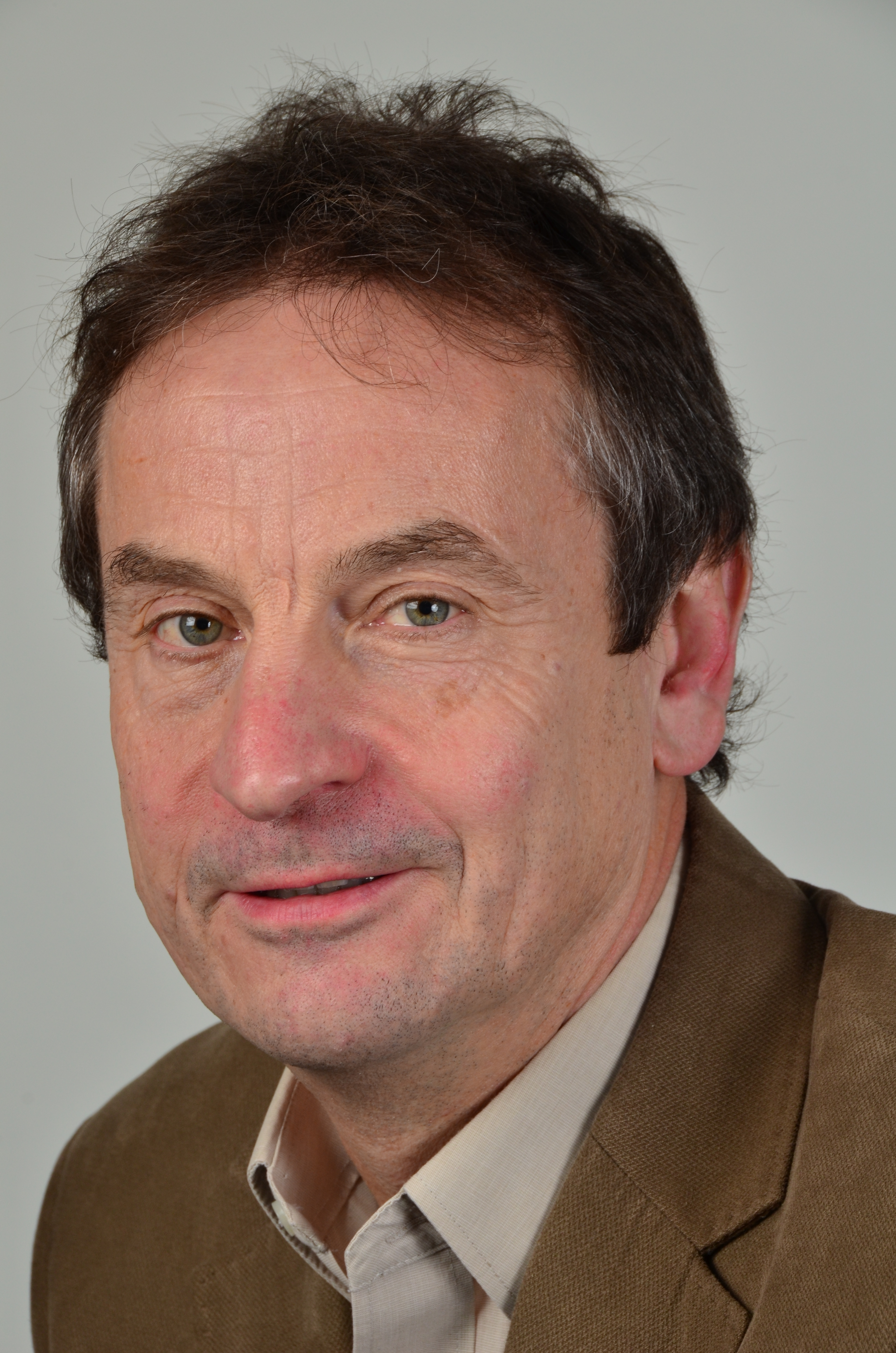

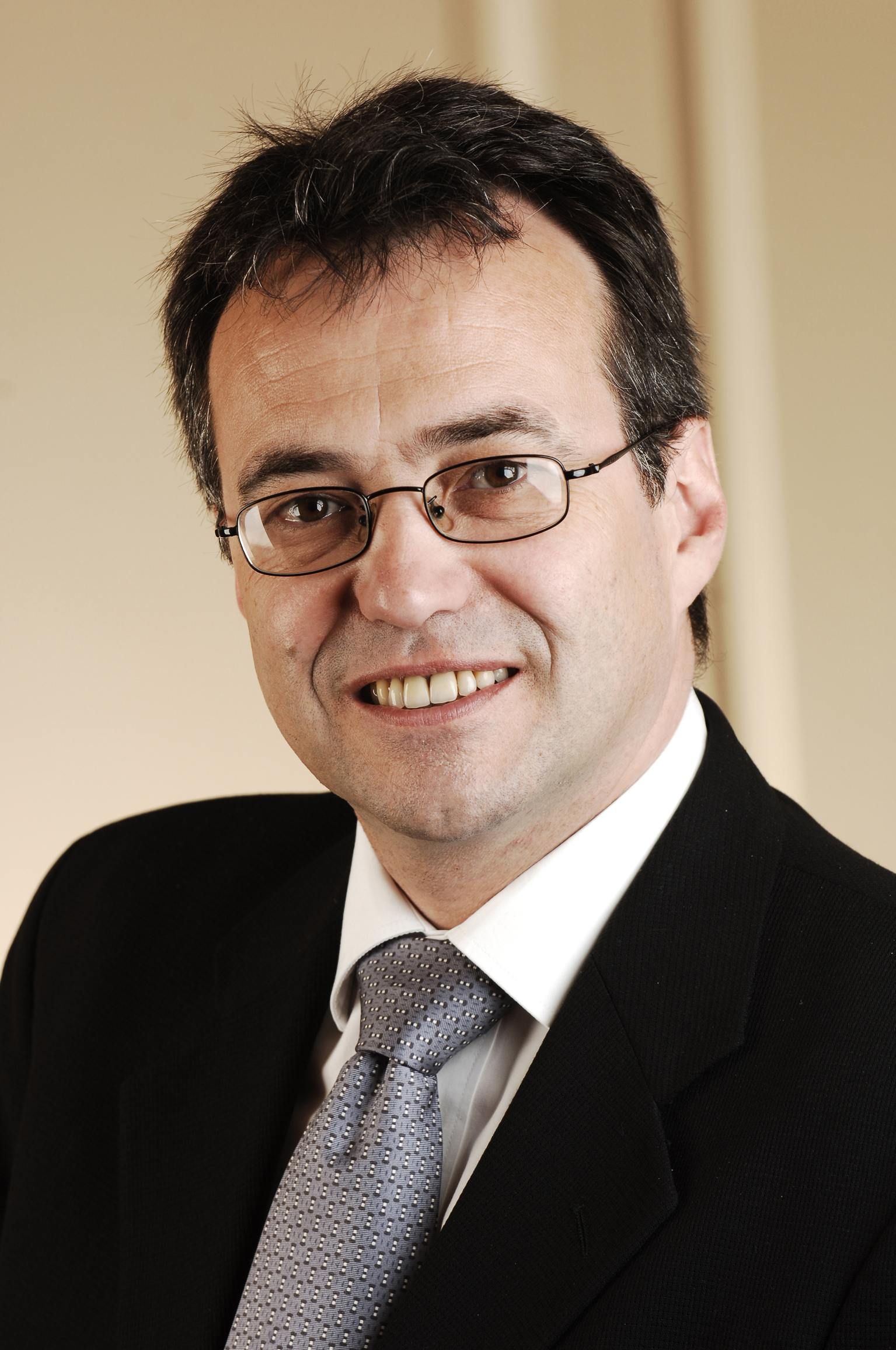
	First party	Second party	Third party
			CON
Candidate	Chris Davies	Phil Woolas	John Hudson
Party	Liberal Democrats	Labour	Conservative
Popular vote	16,231	14,238	9,934
Percentage	38.5%	33.8%	23.6%
Swing	▲2.7 pp	▲14.9 pp	▼20.7 pp
MP before election
Geoffrey Dickens
Conservative
Elected MP
Chris Davies
Liberal Democrats

A by-election was called to take place on 27 July 1995 in the constituency of Littleborough and Saddleworth in Greater Manchester, England, following the death of Conservative Party MP Geoffrey Dickens on 17 May of that year.

The contest was a win for the Liberal Democrat candidate Chris Davies. The result was notable, for the incumbent Conservative Party fell from first to third place, coming behind both the Labour Party and the Liberal Democrats. Davies' conduct during the by-election was controversial owing to his openly campaigning while the sitting MP Geoffrey Dickens was dying from liver cancer.

The second-placed Labour candidate, Phil Woolas, defeated Davies at the 1997 general election in the successor seat of Oldham East and Saddleworth. He held the seat until 2010. Davies went on to represent the North West England region in the European Parliament from 1999 to 2014.

== Result ==
Littleborough and Saddleworth by-election 1995
Party	Candidate	Votes	%	±%
Liberal Democrats	Chris Davies	16,231	38.5	+2.7
Labour	Phil Woolas	14,238	33.8	+14.9
Conservative	John Hudson	9,934	23.6	–20.6
Monster Raving Loony	Screaming Lord Sutch	782	1.9	New
UKIP	John Whittaker	549	1.3	New
Conversative Party	Peter Douglas	193	0.5	New
Independent	Mr Blobby	105	0.2	New
Socialist (GB)	Andrew Pitts	46	0.1	New
Independent	Lawson McLaren	33	0.1	New
Independent	Colin Palmer	25	0.1	New
Majority		1,993	4.7	N/A
Turnout		42,136	64.5	–17.1
Liberal Democrats gain from Conservative		Swing	–6.0	

== Notes on candidates ==
- Mr Blobby was a character on the British television show Noel's House Party. The candidate had changed his name from John McLagan for the purposes of the election. The candidate was not officially endorsed by the BBC, nor was McLagan the actual actor of Mr Blobby.
- The candidate L. McLaren used the party description "Probity for Imposed Candidates"

== See also ==
- Littleborough and Saddleworth
- Oldham East and Saddleworth
- 2011 Oldham East and Saddleworth by-election
- Lists of United Kingdom by-elections
