= Geoffrey Dickens =

British politician (1931–1995)

Geoffrey Dickens MP

Member of Parliament for Littleborough and Saddleworth
- In office 9 June 1983 – 17 May 1995
- Preceded by: New constituency
- Succeeded by: Chris Davies

Member of Parliament for Huddersfield West
- In office 3 May 1979 – 13 May 1983
- Preceded by: Kenneth Lomas
- Succeeded by: Constituency abolished

Personal details
- Born: Geoffrey Kenneth Dickens; 26 August 1931 London, England
- Died: 17 May 1995 (aged 63) Hertfordshire, England
- Party: Conservative
- Spouse: Norma Boothby (m. 1956)
- Children: 2

Geoffrey Kenneth Dickens (26 August 1931 – 17 May 1995) was a British Conservative politician. He was MP for Huddersfield West from 1979 until the seat was abolished in 1983. He was then elected for Littleborough and Saddleworth and held the seat until his death in 1995.

Dickens is known for his anti-paedophile work, including the naming of diplomat Sir Peter Hayman as a paedophile in the House of Commons.

== Early life ==
Geoffrey Kenneth Dickens was born on 26 August 1931 in London and fostered until he was eight years old. He never had contact with his mother afterwards. He was educated at schools at East Lane in Wembley and at Acton Technical College. He contracted polio when he was 13, for which he had to spend two years in hospital.

During his youth Dickens became a heavyweight boxer, sparring with Don Cockell and Henry Cooper. He had 60 bouts, of which he won 40. He worked as an Aviation Design Draughtsman at BSP Industries in Borehamwood, Herts, whom he represented as a talented goalkeeper; he became a member of St Albans Rural District Council from 1967 to 1974, and was its chairman in 1970–71. He also was a member of Hertfordshire County Council in 1970–1975.

In 1972 Dickens was awarded the Royal Humane Society's Testimonial on Vellum after he saved two boys and a man from drowning in the sea off Mallorca.

== Member of Parliament ==
A Conservative politician, Dickens stood unsuccessfully for Middlesbrough in February 1974 (coming second out of two, behind Labour, on 33.7%) and for Ealing North in October 1974 (finishing second of three, with 39.7%). He won Huddersfield West in 1979 but this seat was abolished after boundary reviews. He was selected as the Conservative candidate for Littleborough and Saddleworth, which he won in 1983. Described as "Falstaffian" and "the original 'rent-a-quote' man", over his time in parliament he campaigned for causes as diverse as the return of hanging and the banning of dangerous teddy bears. He indicated in a 1987 BBC Heart of the Matter documentary that consideration should be given to re-criminalising homosexuality to prevent the spread of HIV/AIDS, and opposed the Lesbian and Gay Christian Movement (LGCM) and ordination of gay priests. He once held a press conference announcing an affair without, apparently, warning his wife. He served on the Commons Energy Select Committee.

== Paedophile ring investigation ==
Between 1981 and 1985, Dickens campaigned against a suspected paedophile ring he claimed to have uncovered that was connected to trading child pornography. In 1981, Dickens named the former British High Commissioner to Canada, Sir Peter Hayman, as a paedophile in the House of Commons, using parliamentary privilege so he could not be sued for slander. Dickens asked why he had not been jailed after the discovery on a bus of violent pornography.

In 1983, Dickens alleged there was a paedophile network involving "big, big names – people in positions of power, influence and responsibility" and threatened to name them in the Commons. The next year, he successfully campaigned for the banning of the Paedophile Information Exchange (PIE) organisation, of which Hayman was a closet member. Dickens had a thirty-minute meeting with the Home Secretary, Leon Brittan, after giving him a dossier containing the child abuse allegations. Although Dickens said he was "encouraged" by the meeting, he later expressed concern that PIE had not (by then) been banned; though it was disbanded in 1984.

On 29 November 1985, Dickens said in a speech to the Commons that paedophiles were "evil and dangerous" and that child pornography generated "vast sums". He further alleged that: "The noose around my neck grew tighter after I named a former high-flying British diplomat on the Floor of the House. Honourable Members will understand that where big money is involved and as important names came into my possession so the threats began. First, I received threatening telephone calls followed by two burglaries at my London home. Then, more seriously, my name appeared on a multi-killer's hit list". Dickens' son later said that about the time when the dossier was given to the Home Secretary, the MP's London flat and constituency home were both broken into but nothing was taken, presumably in a search for documents.

The Labour MP Tom Watson asked the Home Office for Dickens' dossier in February 2013. A Home Office review that year concluded that any information requiring investigation was referred to the police, but revealed that Mr Dickens' dossier was "not retained".

After the issue had been raised again by Labour MP Simon Danczuk in July 2014, the former Director of Public Prosecutions, Lord Macdonald, said the circumstances in which the dossier had gone missing were alarming, and recommended an inquiry into the fate of the dossier.

Prime Minister David Cameron asked the Home Office Permanent Secretary to investigate what had happened to the missing dossier. Danczuk responded that another internal inquiry was merely trying to limit damage, and that a public inquiry was necessary to retain public confidence. The missing dossier has been linked with investigations into the Elm Guest House child abuse scandal.

In 2015, a file from 1981 was released into the National Archives titled SECURITY. Sir Peter Hayman: allegations against former public official of unnatural sexual proclivities; security aspects, showing that the then-Prime Minister Margaret Thatcher had been briefed on the matter before the allegations were made public by Dickens.

== Legacy ==
The journalist Patrick Cosgrave said of Dickens in his obituary: "Nobody thought more highly of his capacities than Dickens himself." Michael Brown, who had been his whip, remembered "a superb constituency man who held down a Tory majority in difficult northern, working-class seats..." Tristan Garel-Jones wrote that "Despite the conscious self-deprecation, he was shrewder than he let on."

== Personal life and death ==
Dickens married Norma Boothby in 1956 and the couple had two children. He died from liver cancer in Hertfordshire on 17 May 1995, at the age of 63. Controversially, his Liberal Democrat successor, Chris Davies, openly campaigned for election during Dickens's illness.

== Sources ==
- Times Guide to the House of Commons, Times Newspapers Limited, 1992 edition.

Parliament of the United Kingdom
Preceded by Kenneth Lomas	Member of Parliament for Huddersfield West; 1979–1983	Constituency abolished
New constituency	Member of Parliament for Littleborough and Saddleworth; 1983–1995	Succeeded by Chris Davies
