= Phil Woolas =

British politician (1959–2026)

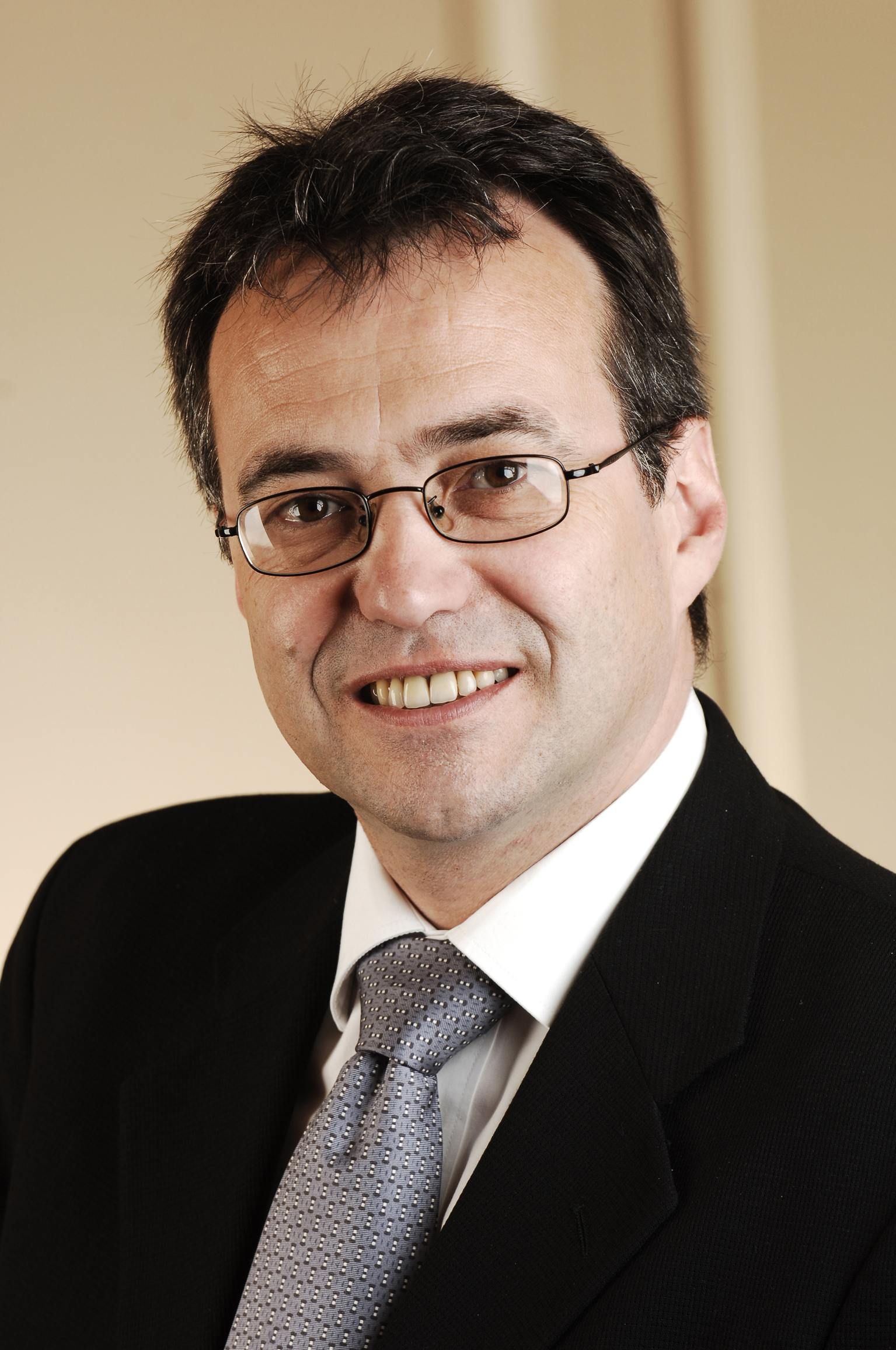
- Official portrait, 2005

Minister of State for Borders and Immigration (Note: Office held jointly at the Home Office and HM Treasury.)
- In office 4 October 2008 – 11 May 2010
- Prime Minister: Gordon Brown
- Preceded by: Liam Byrne
- Succeeded by: Damian Green

Minister of State for the Environment
- In office 28 June 2007 – 4 October 2008
- Prime Minister: Gordon Brown
- Preceded by: Ian Pearson
- Succeeded by: The Lord Hunt of Kings Heath

Minister of State for Local Government
- In office 10 May 2005 – 28 June 2007
- Prime Minister: Tony Blair
- Preceded by: Nick Raynsford
- Succeeded by: John Healey

Minister for Social Exclusion
- In office 9 May 2005 – 5 May 2006
- Prime Minister: Tony Blair
- Preceded by: Barbara Roche
- Succeeded by: Hilary Armstrong

Deputy Leader of the House of Commons
- In office 13 June 2003 – 9 May 2005
- Prime Minister: Tony Blair
- Preceded by: Ben Bradshaw
- Succeeded by: Nigel Griffiths

Lord Commissioner of the Treasury
- In office 29 May 2002 – 13 June 2003
- Prime Minister: Tony Blair
- Preceded by: Tony McNulty
- Succeeded by: Derek Twigg

Member of Parliament for Oldham East and Saddleworth
- In office 1 May 1997 – 5 November 2010
- Preceded by: Constituency established
- Succeeded by: Debbie Abrahams

Personal details
- Born: Philip James Woolas; 11 December 1959 Scunthorpe, Lincolnshire, England
- Died: 14 March 2026 (aged 66)
- Party: Labour
- Spouse: Tracey Allen
- Children: 2
- Education: Victoria University of Manchester
- Occupation: Television producer

Philip James Woolas (11 December 1959 – 14 March 2026) was a British environmental consultant, political lobbyist, television producer and politician who served as Minister of State for Borders and Immigration from 2008 to 2010. A member of the Labour Party, he was Member of Parliament (MP) for Oldham East and Saddleworth from 1997 to 2010.

Before being elected at the 1997 general election, Woolas was president of the National Union of Students (NUS), a producer for BBC programme Newsnight and an official at the GMB trade union. In November 2010, he was found to have breached the Representation of the People Act 1983 in the course of the 2010 general election. As a result, his victory of 103 votes at the election was declared void, he lost his seat in the House of Commons and he was barred from standing again at the subsequent by-election. He was also suspended from the Labour Party until January 2011, when his suspension was lifted.

== Early life ==
Woolas was born in Scunthorpe, Lincolnshire, on 11 December 1959. He went to Nelson Grammar School and, after O levels, Nelson and Colne College. He received a BA in philosophy from the Victoria University of Manchester.

He joined the Labour Party at the age of 16, and became involved in student politics through the Anti-Nazi League. Before becoming an MP, he was president of the National Union of Students from 1984 to 1986, a television producer for the BBC on Newsnight from 1988 to 1990 (where he became firm friends with fellow Manchester United supporter Michael Crick), producer at ITN's Channel 4 News from 1990 to 1991 and head of communications at the GMB trade union from 1991 to 1997.

== Parliamentary career ==
Woolas first won his seat for Labour in the 1997 general election, having contested the predecessor Littleborough and Saddleworth seat at a by-election in 1995, which was marked by Labour's particularly vicious and personal campaign, attacking the Liberal Democrat candidate, Chris Davies, as "high on tax and soft on drugs". Peter Mandelson admitted in his autobiography that they had gone "on the attack", writing "After the campaign was over, not only our opponents but some in Labour would denounce our 'negative' tactics in highlighting Lib Dem front-runner Chris Davies' support for higher taxes and a Royal Commission to liberalise drugs laws. For tactical reasons, I felt we had had little choice".

In 1999, Woolas became parliamentary private secretary to Lord Macdonald of Tradeston, a Transport Minister, and was made a whip in 2001.

In June 2003, he was appointed Deputy Leader of the House of Commons under the Government's newly appointed Leader of the Commons, Peter Hain. During the May 2005 ministerial reshuffle, he also served briefly under Hain's successor, Geoff Hoon.

Between the same reshuffle and June 2007, Woolas was Minister of State for Local Government at the Deputy Prime Minister's Office and then the Department for Communities and Local Government, the 2006 successor to the DPMO. During 2005, Woolas was accused of evading parliamentary questions with regard to public calls for reform of the Local Government Ombudsman in 2005.

On 28 June 2007, he became Minister for the Environment at the Department for the Environment, Food and Rural Affairs (in the Brown ministry). He had responsibility for climate change, energy and sustainable development.

In October 2006, Woolas was involved in the United Kingdom debate over veils, arguing that Aishah Azmi, a Muslim teaching assistant who wore an Islamic veil in class, should be sacked.

In February 2008, he asserted that inter-cousin marriage was a cause of the relatively high incidence of disability within predominantly Pakistani culture. The debate was welcomed by Ann Cryer MP who cited incidences in her own constituency. This debate was still continuing in 2011.

Following the cabinet re-shuffle of 3 October 2008, Woolas was made Minister of State for Borders and Immigration at both the Home Office and HM Treasury.

In the United Kingdom parliamentary expenses scandal of 2009, Phil Woolas reportedly claimed expenses for items not allowed under the rules. Woolas said the items were on a receipt he submitted under food claims, but were not claimed themselves, and threatened a newspaper with legal action. The Legge enquiry into MPs' expenses cleared Woolas.

In November 2008, Woolas attacked lawyers and charities working on behalf of asylum seekers, accusing them of undermining the law and "playing the system" by taking legal action.

In February 2010, following the accusations of bullying made against Gordon Brown and other members of the UK cabinet, Woolas was quoted as referring to the head of the National Bullying Helpline, Christine Pratt, as "this prat of a woman" in a radio interview.

=== Gurkha veterans' resettlement rights ===
In spring 2009, Woolas was involved in a controversy regarding the rights for Gurkhas to settle in the United Kingdom. On 24 April 2009, Woolas proposed a new settlement for Gurkhas who were discharged before 1997. According to The Economist:

Veterans would be allowed to settle only if they met one or more conditions based on length of service, gallantry or related illness. Many of the requirements seemed designed to frustrate: for example, one way to qualify automatically was by soldiering for at least 20 years, though most rank-and-file Gurkhas serve for only 15. Another was to prove that a long-term medical condition was caused or worsened by active service; a tall order for those whose injuries were sustained decades ago.

These proposals later were denounced in a vote at the House of Commons, with many Labour MPs voting across party lines. Woolas was later confronted at the BBC Westminster studios by the actress Joanna Lumley, the face of the Gurkha Justice Campaign. After Ms Lumley pursued him around the studio, the pair held an impromptu press conference in which she pressured him into agreeing to further talks over the settlement rights of Gurkhas. On 21 May, Home Secretary Jacqui Smith announced that all Gurkha veterans who had served four years or more in the British Army before 1997 would be allowed to settle in Britain. Gurkhas serving after 1997 had been given UK settlement rights in 2004.

Woolas stated that cost was a prime consideration: "Our estimate is £1.4 billion, and I remind the House that that would come from the defence budget." However, according to a Freedom of Information request, the only impact on the Defence budget has been £20,000 per year to set up and run the settlement office in Kathmandu.

=== 2010 Labour leadership election ===
Woolas was re-elected in the 2010 general election, although the result would later be overturned by an election court. He gave his backing to close political ally David Miliband in the Labour leadership election and represented him at events throughout the country. The Times described Woolas as "a campaign fixer for Mr Miliband". However, Woolas officially nominated Diane Abbott, at the request of Miliband. Woolas said, "I nominated her as an act of pluralism. We thought it would send a strong signal that David will be an inclusive leader."

== 2010 re-election and election court case ==
In his 2010 re-election campaign, Woolas's campaigning methods were heavily criticised by his Liberal Democrat opponents and the Muslim Public Affairs Committee UK (MPACUK). Critics accused him, among other things, of "inflaming racial tensions" in an area that had already experienced race riots. Trevor Phillips, head of the Equality and Human Rights Commission and former Labour politician, described some of the language used in the party's leaflets as "not helpful."

Woolas and his agent, Joe Fitzpatrick, were also responsible for photo manipulation of images in his election addresses. In one case, they manipulated an image to show his Liberal Democrat opponent Elwyn Watkins in front of armed police, allegedly to imply Watkins had been arrested. This was a composite image, consisting of a portrait of Watkins and a photograph of armed police patrolling London. The Metropolitan Police insignia was also airbrushed from a female officer's jacket.

Woolas won the election and was returned to Parliament with a majority of 103 votes – down from 3,590.

Following the election of Ed Miliband as the Labour Party Leader, Woolas was reappointed to the immigration brief on the shadow front bench team. The New Statesman said it was a "bizarre decision" as Woolas had "run one of the most disgraceful election campaigns in recent history".

=== Election court case ===
On 28 May 2010, Watkins issued an election petition against the result under section 106 of the Representation of the People Act 1983, which makes it illegal to make false statements of fact about a candidate. He claimed that leaflets issued by Woolas falsely portrayed Watkins as taking unlawful foreign donations, and linked him to Islamists.

During the court case, held in public at Saddleworth Civic Hall, a number of emails between Woolas and his campaign team emerged. In one, Woolas's agent and former Labour councillor Joseph Fitzpatrick emailed Woolas and Steven Green, the MP's campaign adviser, to say: "Things are not going as well as I had hoped ... we need to think about our first attack leaflet." A reply from Fitzpatrick said: "If we don’t get the white vote angry he's gone."

During the course of the court case, both Woolas and Fitzpatrick were cautioned by the presiding judge in respect of possible criminal charges relating to election offences. The court hearing finished in September 2010. On 5 November 2010, the court ruled that Woolas breached section 106 of the Representation of the People Act 1983, and ordered a fresh election for the seat to be held. In a statement released through his lawyer, Woolas stated that "this election petition raised fundamental issues about the freedom to question and criticise politicians" and that it "will inevitably chill political speech".

Woolas applied for a judicial review into the ruling; however, he had to ask for donations as the Labour Party had withdrawn their support for him. The High Court rejected his request for a judicial review. Woolas launched a second judicial review (technically a renewed application for permission to seek judicial review), which was heard in person at the High Court on 16 November 2010. The judges' decision took longer than expected, with them saying that there were "difficult questions to resolve".

Following the initial court result, Woolas received goodwill messages from former Labour Prime Minister Gordon Brown and from Cherie Blair, wife of former Labour Prime Minister Tony Blair. Labour MP Graham Stringer (Blackley and Broughton) was vocally supportive and criticised Labour deputy leader Harriet Harman and the party for suspending Woolas.

A decision on this second request was published on 3 December 2010. Woolas was accompanied to court by the Labour Shadow Health Secretary John Healey. The court granted Woolas permission to bring judicial review; the review overturned one of the three breaches of section 106 of the Representation of the People Act 1983 found by the Election Court. The other two breaches stood: "this does not affect the certificate as the findings of an illegal practice in relation to the other two matters cannot be impugned". On leaving court, Woolas said, "It is the end of the road – I am out." He lost his seat in the House of Commons. A by-election for his former seat was held on 13 January 2011, in which the new Labour candidate, Debbie Abrahams, defeated Watkins.

After the review ruling, a Labour spokesman said, "The Labour Party administratively suspended Phil Woolas after the original judgment of the election court. Following the conclusion of this judicial review, the Labour Party will consider this issue in detail and whether further action is appropriate." Although the verdict of the election court indicated a prima facie breach of criminal law, in March 2011 the Crown Prosecution Service announced that it would not bring criminal charges against Woolas as his disqualification by the Election Court from holding elected office was deemed "sufficient punishment". The CPS also declined to prosecute Joseph Fitzpatrick, although, as an election agent, he was responsible for the items deemed to have broken the law; he later stood unsuccessfully in Oldham as a council candidate for UKIP.

== After Parliament ==
Woolas was a director of two organisations – Boothwood Partners, an environmental consultancy, and Wellington Street Partners, a political lobbying partnership originally formed with former MPs Paul Keetch (Liberal Democrat) and Sir Sydney Chapman (Conservative).

== Personal life ==
Woolas was married to events organiser and ex-lobbyist Tracey Jane Allen, former co-director of lobbying firm Morgan Allen Moore. The couple had two sons.

Woolas died from glioblastoma on 14 March 2026, aged 66.

== See also ==
- Miranda Grell, whose case fell under the same provision. Grell was prosecuted, rather than having her election petitioned against.

== Notes ==
Parliament of the United Kingdom
New constituency	Member of Parliament for Oldham East and Saddleworth; 1997 – 5 November 2010	Succeeded by Debbie Abrahams
Political offices
Preceded by Neil Stewart	President of the National Union of Students; 1984–1986	Succeeded by Vicky Phillips
Preceded by Liam Byrne	Minister of State for Borders and Immigration; 2008–2010	Succeeded by Damian Green
