= Donald Wade, Baron Wade =

British solicitor and Liberal Party Member of Parliament

The Right Honourable The Lord Wade DL

President of the Liberal Party
- In office 20 September 1967 – 18 September 1968
- Leader: Jeremy Thorpe
- Preceded by: Michael Eden
- Succeeded by: Desmond Banks

Deputy Leader of the Liberal Party
- In office April 1960 – 15 October 1964
- Leader: Jo Grimond
- Preceded by: Megan Lloyd George (1951)
- Succeeded by: John Pardoe (1976)

Liberal Chief Whip
- In office 13 November 1956 – 7 September 1962
- Leader: Jo Grimond
- Preceded by: Jo Grimond
- Succeeded by: Arthur Holt

Member of the House of Lords
- Lord Temporal
- Life peerage 28 December 1964 – 8 November 1988

Member of Parliament for Huddersfield West
- In office 23 February 1950 – 25 September 1964
- Preceded by: Constituency created
- Succeeded by: Kenneth Lomas

Personal details
- Born: Donald William Wade; 16 June 1904 Ilkley, West Riding of Yorkshire
- Died: 8 November 1988 (aged 84)
- Party: Liberal
- Education: Trinity Hall, Cambridge

Donald William Wade, Baron Wade, DL (16 June 1904 – 6 November 1988) was a British solicitor and Liberal Party politician who served as the Member of Parliament for Huddersfield West from the 1950 general election until his defeat in the 1964 election. Wade's time in Parliament coincided with the time the Liberals were at their lowest ebb but his job as Chief Whip kept the party operating until times were better; however, his own seat was dependent on a local pact with the Conservatives and when it broke down, he was defeated. He was then elevated to the House of Lords where he became an active Peer.

== Early life and career ==
Wade was born in Ilkley to a wealthy family who were Congregationalists. He had a poorly childhood, suffering from poliomyelitis. He was sent to the independent boarding Mill Hill School, set up by nonconformists, and went from there to Trinity Hall, Cambridge. After lecturing in Law at the University of Leeds, he qualified as a solicitor and joined a law firm in Leeds where he became a partner.

== Political career ==
=== Liberalism ===
Active in the Liberal Party, Wade wrote many pamphlets supporting Liberal policy. He was chairman of the Yorkshire Liberal Federation for many years, and served on the Liberal Party Executive from 1949. When boundary changes proposed in 1948 produced two constituencies based on the town of Huddersfield, where the local Liberal Association was strong, Wade proposed to the local Conservative Association that their respective parties would benefit from a pact whereby each agreed to fight only one of the constituencies and to support the other's candidate. The Conservatives wanted a pledge that any Liberal MP elected would not support a Labour government in a vote of no confidence; Wade slightly softened the wording and pledged that he "would not vote in such a way as to give a vote of confidence to an administration committed to further Socialist measures", which was accepted.

=== Election campaign ===
Accordingly, at the 1950 general election, Wade was nominated in Huddersfield West in a straight fight against the Labour candidate. He won with a majority of nearly 7,000, although the Conservatives failed to win in Huddersfield East. Wade was helped by the coverage of the Huddersfield Examiner whose editor was a Liberal but believed in extensive coverage of political issues.

=== Parliamentary career ===
Wade took an interest in international affairs, challenging the Attlee government on its treatment of Seretse Khama in Bechuanaland. He was a member of the All-Party Parliamentary Committee on World Government and went as a delegate to the Congress on World Government in 1951. The same year he complained about the 'colour bar' being operated by British Rail and the National Union of Railwaymen, preventing black immigrants from working in certain posts.

In the early 1950s, Wade pressed for the United Kingdom government to sign up to the Schuman Declaration, the coal and steel co-operation agreement between six European governments which led to the later establishment of the European Economic Community. Wade was concerned that the establishment of commercial television would lead to lower standards and voted against the Television Bill of 1954. This issue had divided the Liberals: of their six MPs, two supported the Bill, two opposed, and two failed to vote. However, he did urge that the 'fourteen-day rule' restricting broadcast discussion on political topics likely to come up in Parliament, should be abolished.

=== Chief Whip ===
Wade's local base was threatened when the pact between Conservatives and Liberals for municipal elections was called off in 1956, but a reconciliation was later agreed. He became Liberal Chief Whip in November 1956 after his predecessor Jo Grimond was elected Leader of the party. His nonconformist faith bade him to join the Parliamentary Temperance Group and he called for restrictions on licensing in the late 1950s because he believed public drunkenness was increasing. He wrote a pamphlet in 1958 called "Towards a Nation of Owners", calling for co-ownership of industry.

In 1958, a movement promoted by Edward Martell grew for a formal alliance of Conservatives and Liberals in an "Anti-Socialist Front". The Liberal Party Executive rejected the idea, whereupon Martell demanded a statement from Wade and from Arthur Holt, MP for Bolton West, who had been elected as a result of a similar pact.

=== Liberal Party role ===
At the 1960 Liberal Assembly, Wade moved a motion on behalf of the Liberal Party Executive which defended the party policy of collective security with multilateral nuclear disarmament. A unilateralist amendment provoked a heated debate, but ultimately the Executive's position was upheld. Although not entirely happy with the more active form of 'community politics' (a new Liberal Party Agent once recalled how Wade got lost when showing her around the constituency), in January 1961 Wade volunteered to spend two days in a constituent's home to assess the noise from a woollen mill.

Wade was a sponsor of the Bills intended to allow Peers to renounce unwanted titles which were introduced after Anthony Wedgwood Benn inherited the Viscountcy of Stansgate in 1960. He was also a member of the Joint Parliamentary Committee on Lords Reform which led to the Peerage Act 1963. With the Liberal Party recovery of the early 1960s, Wade asked why the National Liberal Organization continued to exist when they were indistinguishable from Conservatives. In 1962 he became Deputy Leader of the Liberal Party in the House of Commons and gave up being Chief Whip.

==== Controversy ====
In July 1962, Wade sponsored a drinks reception at the House of Commons on behalf of a whisky company, having been asked to by former Liberal MP and public relations consultant Frank Owen. Sir Herbert Butcher, chairman of the Kitchen Committee, expressed his concern that the facilities of the House were being used on behalf of public relations companies.

=== Defeat ===
In 1961, the Huddersfield pact was declared over and a Conservative candidate was adopted. At the 1964 general election Wade therefore found himself with Conservative and Labour opponents. The campaign in Huddersfield West was fairly bitter, with both the Conservative and Labour agents insisting that Wade would come bottom of the poll. In the event, Wade came second to Labour's Kenneth Lomas, and beat the Conservative candidate by a little under 500 votes.

=== Peerage ===
Wade did lose his seat to Labour, but only by 1,280 votes; he was praised for a strong electoral performance and asked by the Liberals to stand again. However, Wade instead accepted a Life Peerage on a Liberal nomination, and on 28 December 1964 was created Baron Wade, of Huddersfield in the West Riding of York. He served as Deputy Liberal Whip in the House of Lords from 1965 to 1967 and was President of the Liberal Party for the year 1967–68. He was a Deputy Lieutenant of the West Riding from 1967.

With his time freed up, Wade became Chairman of the Yorkshire Committee for Community Relations, which dealt with race relations. In 1968 he was nominated for election as an Alderman of Leeds City Council but the other parties declined to support him. In the House of Lords he used his freedom to promote legislation on subjects which interested him: in 1969 he introduced a Bill to introduce local ombudsmen.

Coat of arms of Donald Wade, Baron Wade
Crest In front of a book bound Gules edged Or thereon a ram's head Argent armed Or a crescent Ermine. Escutcheon Gules a rose Argent barbed and seeded Proper issuant from either flank a demi-portcullis chained Or. Supporters On either side a ram Argent armed and unguled Or gorged with a baron's coronet Proper and pendant therefrom by a riband Gules an escutcheon of the arms. Motto Nil Despero Ardua Vinco

== Human rights ==
In the 1970s Wade launched a campaign to make the European Convention on Human Rights part of United Kingdom law. He introduced a Bill to this effect in several sessions; in 1977, a Conservative motion to refer it to a Select Committee succeeded. The Committee was split down the middle, but the full House endorsed the principle by 56 votes to 30 in November 1978. He kept up the campaign after Margaret Thatcher became Prime Minister, but she refused to initiate talks. In 1978 Wade urged Liberal leader Jeremy Thorpe to stand down after Thorpe was charged with conspiracy to murder.

Parliament of the United Kingdom
New constituency	Member of Parliament for Huddersfield West; 1950–1964	Succeeded by Kenneth Lomas
Party political offices
Preceded by Jo Grimond	Liberal Chief Whip; 1956–1962	Succeeded by Arthur Holt
Vacant Title last held by Megan Lloyd George	Deputy Leader of the Liberal Party; 1960–1964	Vacant Title next held by John Pardoe
Preceded by Michael Eden	President of the Liberal Party; 1967–1968	Succeeded by Desmond Banks
