= Chris Davies (Liberal Democrat politician) =

British politician (born 1954)

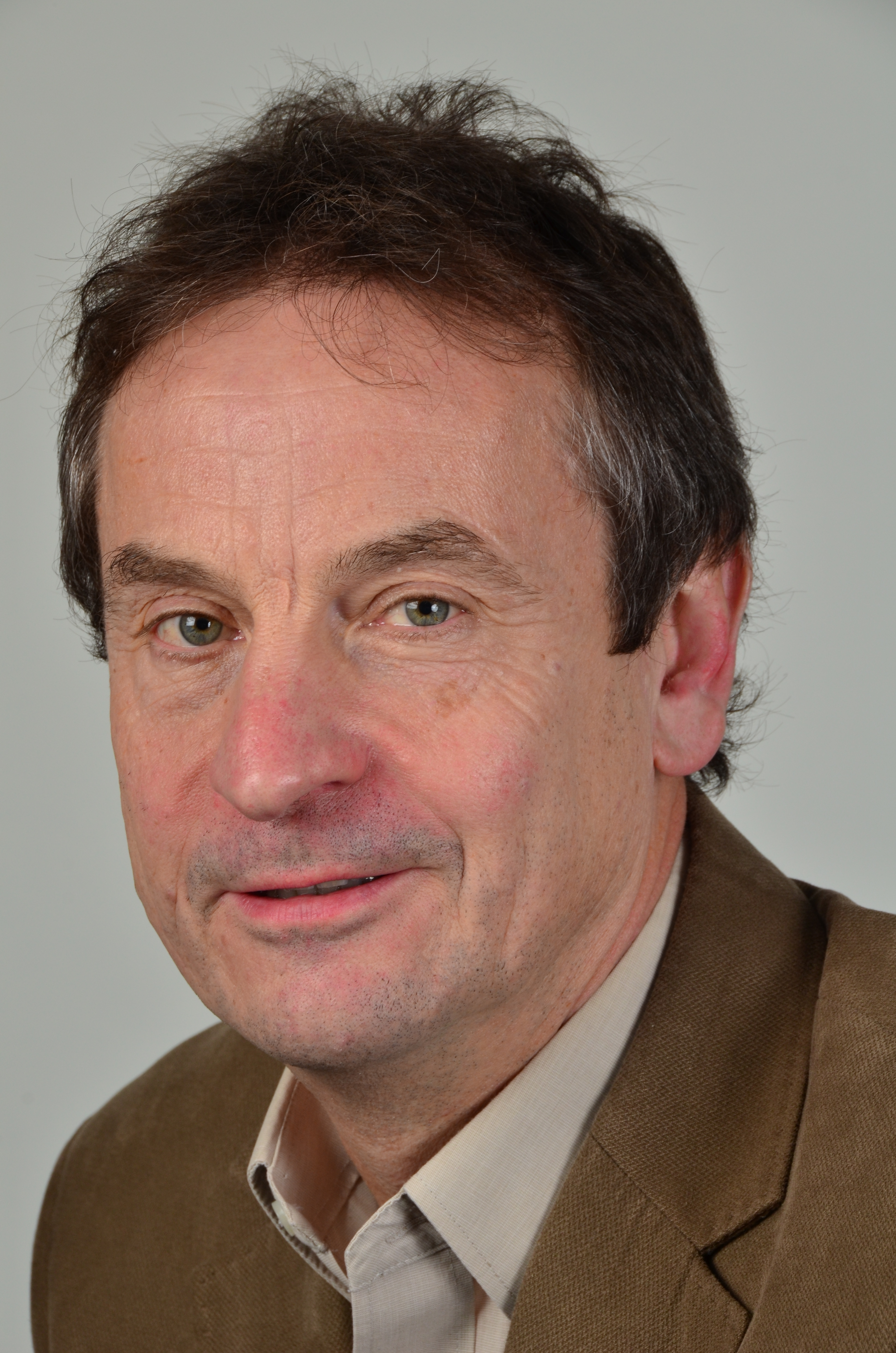
- Davies in 2014

Member of the European Parliament for North West England
- In office 2 July 2019 – 31 January 2020
- Preceded by: Jacqueline Foster
- Succeeded by: Constituency abolished
- In office 10 June 1999 – 2 July 2014
- Preceded by: Constituency established
- Succeeded by: Afzal Khan

Member of Parliament for Littleborough and Saddleworth
- In office 27 July 1995 – 8 April 1997
- Preceded by: Geoffrey Dickens
- Succeeded by: Constituency abolished

Personal details
- Born: Christopher Graham Davies; 7 July 1954 (age 72) Lytham St Annes, Lancashire, England
- Party: Liberal Democrats
- Education: Cheadle Hulme School; Gonville and Caius College, Cambridge

Christopher Graham Davies (born 7 July 1954) is a Liberal Democrat politician in the United Kingdom. He was a Member of Parliament for Littleborough and Saddleworth from 1995 to 1997. He served as a Member of the European Parliament for North West England from 1999 to 2014 and from 2019 to 2020.

== Biography ==
Davies was born in Lytham St Annes, Lancashire. His father was a doctor, and his mother a nurse. He was educated at the independent Cheadle Hulme School (1965–1972), at Gonville and Caius College, Cambridge (1972–1975, reading history) and from 1975 to 1977 at the University of Kent, Canterbury.

Davies is a resident of Greenfield, in Saddleworth, Oldham, Greater Manchester.

== Political career ==
=== Local government ===
Davies was a Liberal member of Liverpool City Council from 1980 to 1984, representing Abercromby ward and serving as Chairman of the Housing Committee. From 1994 to 1998 he was a Liberal Democrat councillor for Lees ward on Oldham Metropolitan Borough Council.

=== Member of Parliament ===
Davies contested Liverpool Scotland Exchange in 1979, and then Littleborough and Saddleworth in 1987 and 1992. He became the MP for that seat after a by-election in 1995, during which time Labour campaign manager Peter Mandelson branded him “...high on taxes and soft on drugs” for supporting Liberal Democrat policy on increasing income tax by 1p in the pound to provide additional funding for education, and to establish a Royal Commission to consider decriminalisation of cannabis. His election campaign was controversial due to Davies openly campaigning while the incumbent MP Geoffrey Dickens was dying from liver cancer.

The Littleborough and Saddleworth seat was abolished by the time of the 1997 General Election. Davies contested Oldham East and Saddleworth at the 1997 election but lost to Phil Woolas of Labour.

=== European Parliament ===
Davies was elected as a Member of the European Parliament for the North West England constituency in 1999 and served as the Liberal Democrat spokesman on the Environment, Public Health and Food Safety Committee (ENVI) in the European Parliament.

In March 2014 he won a parliamentarian of the year award for his work to promote sustainable fishing through Fish for the Future, an all-party group he created in 2010. His efforts included dressing as a fish in the European Parliament to raise awareness of the need for reform of the Common Fisheries Policy (CFP). He lost his seat in the 2014 European election.

During his time as an MEP, Davies was active in the environment, climate and energy policy sectors, and served as the ALDE coordinator (team leader) on the ENVI committee from 2007. He was the rapporteur for the Geological Storage of Carbon Dioxide (Carbon capture and storage, CCS) Directive in 2008-9 and for the implementation report on CCS in 2013–14, which called for greater action to develop and deploy CCS in the EU. In 2008 he drafted an amendment that led to the creation of a funding mechanism for CCS and innovative renewable energy projects that became known as NER300, later described by the European Commission as one of the world's largest funding programmes for innovative low-carbon energy demonstration projects.

Davies was elected for a second time as a MEP representing the Liberal Democrats at the 2019 European Parliament election for the North West England constituency. His term ended eight months later when the United Kingdom left the European Union on 31 January 2020.

== Controversies ==
Davies served as the Liberal Democrat spokesman on the environment and public health in the European Parliament.

In 2006, Davies was forced to resign as leader of the Liberal Democrats group in the European Parliament, due to the tone of a series of emails he exchanged with a Jewish constituent. Davies accused a Jewish constituent of "wallowing in your own filth"; accused Israel of "posing as a victim" while pursuing "racist policies of apartheid" and had written "I shall denounce the influence of the Jewish lobby that seems to have far too great a say over the political decision-making process in many countries." Party Leader Sir Menzies Campbell called his comments "unacceptable".

In 2008, Davies made some widely publicised comments on an unpublished report which, he claimed, contained evidence of "embezzlement and fraud" among EU parliament members.

At the autumn 2009 Liberal Democrat conference in Bournemouth, Davies made a speech in a debate about the MP expenses scandal, where he appeared to become very angry, saying: "I hate the dirty cheating bastards who have taken every opportunity to fill their private pockets with public money … they should play no part in public life". He went on to implore his Liberal Democrat colleagues to "Publish everything, reveal all, hide nothing."

Parliament of the United Kingdom
Preceded by Geoffrey Dickens	Member of Parliament for Littleborough and Saddleworth; 1995–1997	Constituency abolished
