= Debbie Abrahams =

British politician (born 1960)

Debbie Abrahams MP
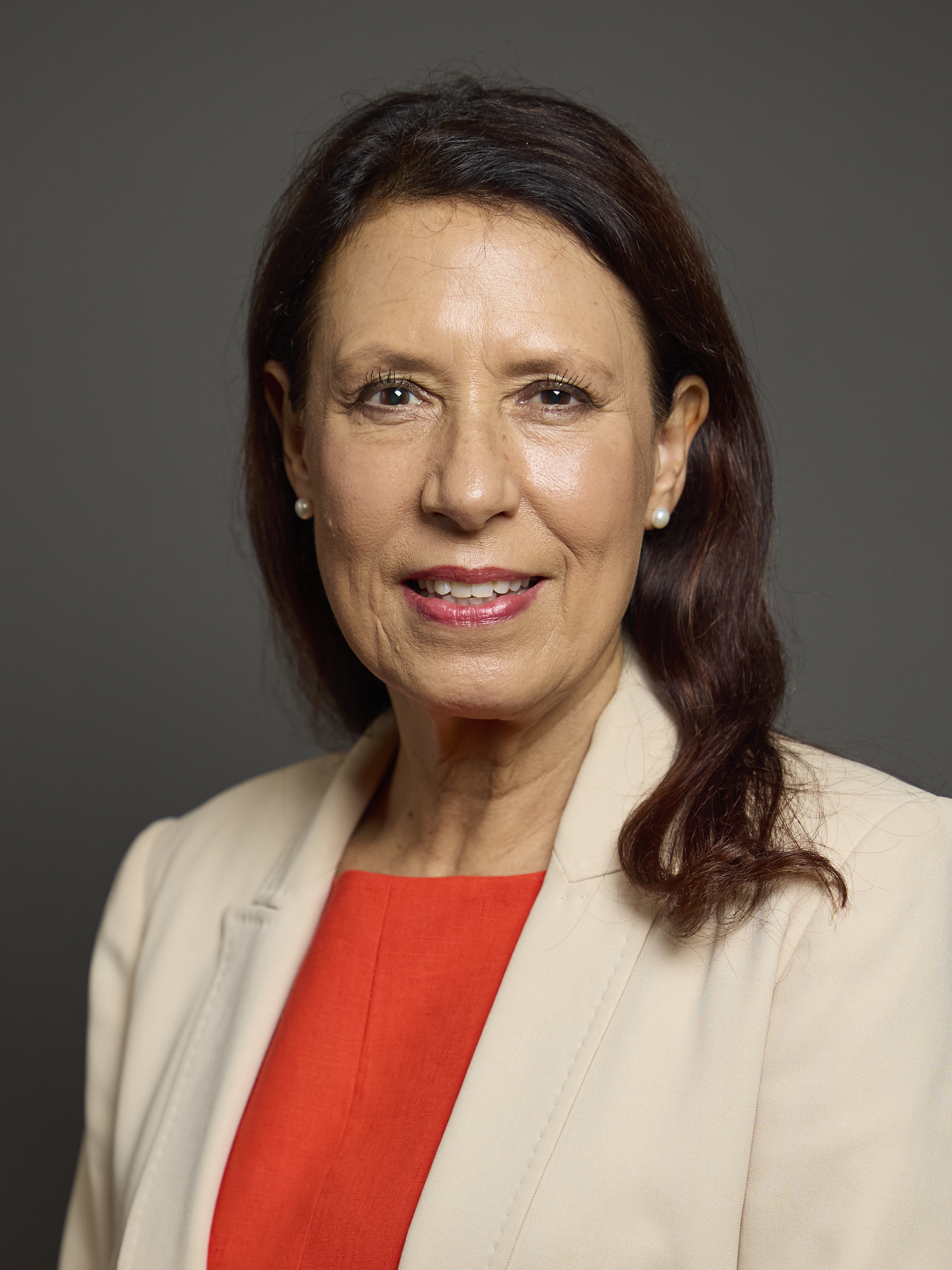
- Official portrait, 2024

Chair of the Work and Pensions Select Committee
- Incumbent
- Assumed office 11 September 2024
- Preceded by: Stephen Timms

Member of Parliament for Oldham East and Saddleworth
- Incumbent
- Assumed office 13 January 2011
- Preceded by: Phil Woolas
- Majority: 6,357 (15.9%)
Shadow portfolios
Shadow Secretary of State
| 2016–2018 | Work and Pensions |
Shadow Minister
| 2015–2016 | Disabled People |

Personal details
- Born: Deborah Angela Elspeth Marie Morgan; 15 September 1960 (age 66) Sheffield, West Riding of Yorkshire, England
- Party: Labour
- Spouse: John Abrahams (m. 1986)
- Children: 2
- Education: University of Salford (BSc); University of Liverpool (MA)
- Website: debbieabrahams.org.uk

Deborah Angela Elspeth Marie Abrahams (née Morgan; born 15 September 1960) is a British Labour Party politician who has served as Member of Parliament (MP) for Oldham East and Saddleworth since 2011. Abrahams was a member of the Corbyn shadow cabinet from 2015 to 2018.

== Early life and education ==
Deborah Angela Elspeth Marie Morgan was born on 15 September 1960 in Sheffield, West Riding of Yorkshire. Her father was a dentist. She was educated at Kent College, a private girls' school in Royal Tunbridge Wells, and received three O‑Level passes.

She studied at the University of Greater Manchester and received a Bachelor of Science degree in biochemistry and physiology from University of Salford. She was awarded a Master of Education degree from the University of Liverpool.

== Early career ==
Her early employment was as a community worker for a charity in Wythenshawe in south Manchester, where she set up job training programmes for teenagers. Abrahams was head of healthy cities for Knowsley and served on the board of Bury and Rochdale Health Authority.

In 2002, Abrahams was appointed chair of Rochdale NHS primary care trust. She was Director of the International Health Impact Assessment Consortium at the University of Liverpool between 2006 and 2010.

== Political career ==
She resigned from the Chair of Rochdale Primary Care Trust in 2007, over the use of private health companies in the National Health Service, which she said was "destroying the NHS". She then joined the Labour Party, declaring that she wanted "to challenge health policy at a local and national level to ensure that it reflects [the] core values" of the NHS. She was appointed by Simon Danczuk, then Labour candidate for Rochdale, as his advisor on health, and she stood for Rochdale Borough Council in Milnrow and Newhey ward in the 2008 local elections. She criticised the local council in Rochdale for failing to address health inequalities in the town.

== Parliamentary career ==
At the 2010 general election, Abrahams stood as the Labour candidate in Colne Valley, coming third with 26.4% of the vote behind the Conservative candidate Jason McCartney and the Liberal Democrat candidate.

In December 2010, Abrahams was placed on a shortlist of three to be the Labour Party candidate for the 2011 Oldham East and Saddleworth by-election. At the by-election, Abrahams was elected to Parliament as MP for Oldham East and Saddleworth (UK Parliament constituency) with 42.1% of the vote and a majority of 3,558.

Abrahams was appointed parliamentary private secretary to Andy Burnham and elected Chair of the Parliamentary Labour Party's Health Committee. In 2014, she organised an Inquiry Into The Effectiveness Of International Health Systems which she said demonstrated that "where there is competition, privatisation or marketisation in a health system, health equity worsens". She sought to reassure Clinical commissioning groups that the Labour Party's proposed health reforms would not amount to a top-down 'big bang' shake up of the NHS.

At the 2015 general election, Abrahams was re-elected as MP for Oldham East and Saddleworth with a decreased vote share of 39.4% and an increased majority of 6,002.

She was elected as a member of the Work and Pensions Select Committee in July 2015. In September 2015, Abrahams was appointed Shadow Minister for Disabled People by Labour leader Jeremy Corbyn in recognition on her work with disabled people in the past. Abrahams was appointed Shadow Secretary of State for Work and Pensions in June 2016, following Owen Smith's resignation from the Shadow Cabinet in the wake of the EU Referendum result.

At the snap 2017 general election, Abrahams was again re-elected, with an increased vote share of 54.5% and an increased majority of 8,182. Abrahams was again re-elected at the 2019 general election, with a decreased vote share of 43.5% and a decreased majority of 1,503.

In February 2021, Abrahams was one of three MPs who successfully took legal action against the Department of Health and Social Care over contracts awarded during the COVID-19 pandemic.

She is a member of Labour Friends of Palestine and the Middle East. She is the current Chair of the APPG on Palestine.

At the 2024 general election, Abrahams was again re-elected, with a decreased vote share of 35.2% and an increased majority of 6,357.

In September 2024, she was elected chair of the Work and Pensions Select Committee. In May 2026, she called for Keir Starmer to resign.

=== 2018 bullying claims ===
In March 2018, Abrahams was suspended from her position as Shadow Work and Pensions Secretary whilst she was investigated by the Labour Party over a "workplace issue", reported by several media outlets to be related to claims that she bullied staff. She vehemently denied the claims, adding that she was the victim of a "bullying culture of the worst kind". In May that year after an investigation in which multiple complainants came forward with complaints of workplace bullying she was found to have engaged in a pattern of bullying behaviour towards her staff. She was removed from the Shadow Cabinet, and her counter-claim of bullying by Labour was thrown out. In a statement, Abrahams said: "I strongly refute the allegations of bullying made against me. I believe the investigation was not thorough, fair or independent." She said she would go to the party's National Executive Committee disputes panel.

== Awards ==
In January 2013, Abrahams was awarded the Grassroot Diplomat Initiative Award in the Business Driver category, for her campaign to improve late payments affecting small businesses. She signed up to be a Champion of the Federation of Small Businesses Real-Life Entrepreneurs Campaign, and as of 2015 was at the forefront of a campaign to improve the speed with which small businesses are paid by their customers.

== Personal life ==
Abrahams married John Abrahams, a former captain of Lancashire County cricket team, in 1986. They have two daughters, Victoria and Dawn.

Parliament of the United Kingdom
| Preceded by Phil Woolas | Member of Parliament for Oldham East and Saddleworth (UK Parliament constituency); 2011–present | Incumbent |
Political offices
| Preceded by Owen Smith | Shadow Secretary of State for Work and Pensions; 2016–2018 | Succeeded by Margaret Greenwood |
