= Littleborough and Saddleworth =

UK Parliament constituency (1983–1997)

Coordinates: 53°38′N 2°06′W

- Former borough constituency for the House of Commons
- Littleborough and Saddleworth in Greater Manchester, showing boundaries used from 1983-1997
- County: Greater Manchester
- Major settlements: Littleborough, Saddleworth and Milnrow

1983–1997
- Seats: One
- Created from: Oldham East, Rochdale and Colne Valley
- Replaced by: Oldham East and Saddleworth and Rochdale

Littleborough and Saddleworth was a parliamentary constituency in Greater Manchester, England. It returned one Member of Parliament (MP) to the House of Commons of the Parliament of the United Kingdom.

The constituency was created for the 1983 general election, and abolished for the 1997 general election.

== History ==
This Conservative-Liberal Democrat marginal was held by the Conservative Party at the three general elections of its existence. The victorious MP on each of these occasions was Geoffrey Dickens, who was elected in 1979 for Huddersfield West (which was a predecessor seat to this constituency, however no part of it was added to this seat when it was created in 1983). However, at a by-election called after Dickens' death in 1995, it was won by Chris Davies of the Liberal Democrats.

== Boundaries ==
1983–1997: The Metropolitan Borough of Oldham wards of Crompton, Lees, Saddleworth East, Saddleworth West, and Shaw, and the Metropolitan Borough of Rochdale wards of Littleborough, Milnrow, and Wardle.

The constituency was centred on the towns of Littleborough, Milnrow and Saddleworth. In 1997, three quarters of the seat became part of the new Oldham East and Saddleworth constituency, with Littleborough and surrounding areas joining the redrawn Rochdale constituency.

== Members of Parliament ==
Election	Member	Party	Notes
1983	Geoffrey Dickens	Conservative	Died in office May 1995
1995 by-election	Chris Davies	Liberal Democrat	
1997	constituency abolished: see Oldham East and Saddleworth & Rochdale		

== Elections ==
=== Elections in the 1990s ===
By-election 1995: Littleborough and Saddleworth
Party	Candidate	Votes	%	±%
Liberal Democrats	Chris Davies	16,231	38.5	+2.7
Labour	Phil Woolas	14,238	33.8	+14.9
Conservative	John Hudson	9,934	23.6	−20.6
Monster Raving Loony	Screaming Lord Sutch	782	1.9	New
UKIP	John Whittaker	549	1.3	New
Independent	Peter Douglas	193	0.5	New
Independent	Mr Blobby	105	0.2	New
Socialist (GB)	Andrew Pitts	46	0.1	New
Independent	Lawson McLaren	33	0.1	New
Independent	Colin Palmer	25	0.1	New
Majority		1,993	4.7	N/A
Turnout		42,136	64.5	−17.1
Liberal Democrats gain from Conservative		Swing	-6.0	

General election 1992: Littleborough and Saddleworth
Party	Candidate	Votes	%	±%
Conservative	Geoffrey Dickens	23,682	44.2	+1.1
Liberal Democrats	Chris Davies	19,188	35.9	+5.0
Labour	Allen J. Brett	10,649	19.9	−6.1
Majority		4,494	8.3	−3.8
Turnout		53,519	81.6	+4.2
Conservative hold		Swing	−1.9	

=== Elections in the 1980s ===
General election 1987: Littleborough and Saddleworth
Party	Candidate	Votes	%	±%
Conservative	Geoffrey Dickens	22,027	43.1	+0.3
Liberal	Chris Davies	15,825	30.9	−0.1
Labour	Paul Stonier	13,299	26.0	+0.7
Majority		6,202	12.1	+0.3
Turnout		51,151	77.4	+2.6
Conservative hold		Swing	+0.2	

General election 1983: Littleborough and Saddleworth
Party	Candidate	Votes	%	±%
Conservative	Geoffrey Dickens	20,510	42.8	
Liberal	Richard Knowles	14,860	31.0	
Labour	Stephen Moore	12,106	25.3	
Restoration of Capital and Corporal Punishment	R Barry	398	0.8	
Majority		5,650	11.8	
Turnout		47,874	74.8	
Conservative win (new seat)				

== See also ==
- List of parliamentary constituencies in Greater Manchester
