= Huddersfield West =

Parliamentary constituency in the United Kingdom, 1950–1983

Coordinates: 53.646°N 1.803°W

- Former borough constituency for the House of Commons

1950–1983
- Seats: one
- Replaced by: Huddersfield and Colne Valley

Huddersfield West was a parliamentary constituency centred on the town of Huddersfield in West Yorkshire. It returned one Member of Parliament (MP) to the House of Commons of the Parliament of the United Kingdom.

The constituency was created for the 1950 general election, and abolished for the 1983 general election.

It was a much more marginal seat than its neighbour, Huddersfield East, which was safely Labour, and was alternately held by the Liberals, Labour Party and finally the Conservatives in 1979.

== Boundaries ==
1950–1955:The County Borough of Huddersfield wards of Birkby, Crosland Moor, Lindley, Lockwood, Longwood, Marsh, Milnsbridge, and Paddock.

1955–1983: The County Borough of Huddersfield wards of Birkby, Crosland Moor, Lindley, Lockwood, Longwood, Marsh, Milnsbridge, Newsome, and Paddock.

== Members of Parliament ==
Election	Member	Party
1950	Donald Wade	Liberal
1964	Ken Lomas	Labour
1979	Geoffrey Dickens	Conservative
1983	constituency abolished: see Huddersfield and Colne Valley	

When this seat was abolished in 1983, Dickens was elected MP for the new seat of Littleborough and Saddleworth, which he held until he died in 1995. Most of the area which this seat covered is now held by Labour within the Huddersfield constituency however its western outskirts now fall under Colne Valley which is a marginal Conservative seat.

== Elections ==
=== Elections in the 1950s ===
General election 1950: Huddersfield West
Party	Candidate	Votes	%	±%
Liberal	Donald Wade	24,456	58.2	
Labour	Harold William Bolt	17,542	41.8	
Majority		6,914	16.4	
Turnout		41,998	86.9	
Liberal win (new seat)				

General election 1951: Huddersfield West
Party	Candidate	Votes	%	±%
Liberal	Donald Wade	24,054	58.5	+0.3
Labour	Harold William Bolt	17,066	41.5	−0.3
Majority		6,988	17.0	+0.6
Turnout		41,120	85.9	−1.0
Liberal hold		Swing		

General election 1955: Huddersfield West
Party	Candidate	Votes	%	±%
Liberal	Donald Wade	24,345	55.1	−3.4
Labour	John Frederick Drabble	16,418	44.9	+3.4
Majority		7,927	10.2	−6.8
Turnout		40,763	79.3	−6.3
Liberal hold		Swing		

General election 1959: Huddersfield West
Party	Candidate	Votes	%	±%
Liberal	Donald Wade	25,273	61.8	+6.7
Labour	James Marsden	15,621	38.2	−6.7
Majority		9,652	23.6	+13.4
Turnout		40,894	79.7	+0.4
Liberal hold		Swing		

=== Elections in the 1960s ===
General election 1964: Huddersfield West
Party	Candidate	Votes	%	±%
Labour	Kenneth Lomas	14,808	35.8	−2.4
Liberal	Donald Wade	13,528	32.7	−29.1
Conservative	John Addey	13,054	31.5	New
Majority		1,280	3.1	N/A
Turnout		41,390	81.6	+1.9
Labour gain from Liberal		Swing	+13.4	

General election 1966: Huddersfield West
Party	Candidate	Votes	%	±%
Labour	Kenneth Lomas	17,990	43.9	+8.1
Conservative	Marcus Fox	13,514	33.0	+1.5
Liberal	Ruslyn Hargreaves	9,470	23.1	−9.6
Majority		4,476	10.9	+7.8
Turnout		40,974	82.3	+0.7
Labour hold		Swing		

=== Elections in the 1970s ===
General election 1970: Huddersfield West
Party	Candidate	Votes	%	±%
Labour	Kenneth Lomas	16,866	41.0	−2.9
Conservative	Richard Storey	16,673	40.6	+7.6
Liberal	William Wallace	6,128	14.9	−8.2
National Front	Ronald Scott	1,427	3.5	New
Majority		193	0.4	−10.5
Turnout		41,094	77.3	−5.0
Labour hold		Swing		

General election February 1974: Huddersfield West
Party	Candidate	Votes	%	±%
Labour	Kenneth Lomas	17,434	39.6	−1.4
Conservative	John Stansfield	16,804	38.2	−2.4
Liberal	Kathleen Hasler	9,790	22.2	+7.3
Majority		630	1.4	+1.0
Turnout		44,028	82.9	+5.6
Labour hold		Swing		

General election October 1974: Huddersfield West
Party	Candidate	Votes	%	±%
Labour	Kenneth Lomas	16,882	41.4	+1.8
Conservative	John Stansfield	15,518	38.0	−0.2
Liberal	Kathleen Hasler	7,503	18.4	−3.8
National Front	D. Ford	760	1.9	New
More Prosperous Britain	Harold Smith	136	0.3	New
Majority		1,364	3.4	+2.0
Turnout		40,799	76.3	−5.6
Labour hold		Swing		

General election 1979: Huddersfield West
Party	Candidate	Votes	%	±%
Conservative	Geoffrey Dickens	18,504	44.2	+6.2
Labour	Richard Faulkner	16,996	40.6	−0.8
Liberal	Kathleen Hasler	6,225	14.9	−3.5
More Prosperous Britain	Tom Keen	101	0.2	−0.1
Majority		1,508	3.6	N/A
Turnout		41,826	76.0	−0.3
Conservative gain from Labour		Swing		
