= Kenneth Lomas =

British politician (1922–2000)

Kenneth Lomas (16 November 1922 – 15 July 2000) was a British Labour Party politician.

Lomas was educated in Ashton-under-Lyne and served in the Royal Marines 1942–46 including in the Commando Group. He worked for the Union of Shop, Distributive and Allied Workers then as assistant regional organiser of the National Blood Transfusion Service. He was branch secretary for the National Union of Public Employees.

Lomas contested Blackpool South at the 1951 general election and Macclesfield in the 1955 general election. He was elected at the 1964 general election as member of parliament (MP) for Huddersfield West, and held the seat until he stood down at the 1979 general election. He later joined the SDP.

Parliament of the United Kingdom
Preceded by Donald Wade	Member of Parliament for Huddersfield West; 1964–1979	Succeeded by Geoffrey Dickens
