= National Bullying Helpline =

British charitable organisation

The National Bullying Helpline was a charity organisation established by David and Christine Pratt, promising to service the needs of victims of bullying, based in Swindon, Wiltshire. After closing in 2011, it reopened as a privately run, national, advice centre in 2012.

== Original charity ==
The National Bullying helpline was founded in 2007. In 2009, they encouraged National Ban Bullying day on 7 November, and National Ban Bullying week starting on 16 November.

In February 2010, National Bullying Helpline caused controversy by alleging that three or four members of Gordon Brown's colleagues had phoned them for advice. This was seen as a breach of their confidentiality, and caused the resignation of all four patrons of the organisation.

Further controversy came when it was revealed that Christine Pratt herself had been involved in racist bullying of another staff member, and that the National Bullying Helpline itself was under investigation by the Charity Commission for submitting accounts late, taking advantage of its clients through exhorting money, and finding clients for David Pratt's HR company. Pratt later resigned as a result, the organisation was temporarily suspended, and the organisation was investigated by the Charity Commission. Pratt subsequently told Swindon Link, a free news publication delivered to 25000 homes around Swindon, that the investigation had exonerated her.

== Private Firm ==
In 2012, National Bullying Helpline reopened as a privately run, national, advice centre in 2012.
