= Rochdale Borough Council elections =

Local government elections in Greater Manchester, England

Rochdale Borough Council elections are generally held three years out of every four, with a third of the council being elected each time. Rochdale Borough Council is the local authority for the metropolitan borough of Rochdale in Greater Manchester, England. Since the last boundary changes in 2022, 60 councillors have been elected from 20 wards.

== Council elections ==
- 1973 election
- 1975 election
- 1976 election
- 1978 election
- 1979 election
- 1980 election
- 1982 election
- 1983 election
- 1984 election
- 1986 election
- 1987 election
- 1988 election
- 1990 election
- 1991 election
- 1992 election
- 1994 election
- 1995 election
- 1996 election
- 1998 election
- 1999 election
- 2000 election
- 2002 election
- 2003 election
- 2004 election (Note: Whole council elected after boundary changes)
- 2006 election
- 2007 election
- 2008 election
- 2010 election
- 2011 election
- 2012 election
- 2014 election
- 2015 election
- 2016 election
- 2018 election
- 2019 election
- 2021 election
- 2022 election (Note: New ward boundaries)
- 2023 election
- 2024 election
- 2026 election

== Borough result maps ==
2004 results map

2006 results map

2007 results map

2008 results map

2010 results map

2011 results map

2012 results map

2014 results map

2015 results map

2016 results map

2018 results map

2019 results map

2021 results map

2022 results map

2023 results map

2024 results map

2026 results map

== By-election results ==
=== 1994-1998 ===
Littleborough By-Election 11 July 1996
Party	Candidate	Votes	%	±%
Liberal Democrats		2,015	56.6	
Labour		1,109	31.7	
Conservative		413	11.6	
Independent		22	0.6	
Majority		906	24.9	
Turnout		3,559		
Liberal Democrats hold		Swing		

=== 1998-2002 ===
Milnrow By-Election 10 June 1999
Party	Candidate	Votes	%	±%
Liberal Democrats		1,347	52.2	+18.7
Labour		716	27.8	−3.2
Conservative		432	16.8	−5.6
Independent		84	3.3	+3.3
Majority		631	24.4	
Turnout		2,579	29.0	
Liberal Democrats hold		Swing		

=== 2006-2010 ===
Middleton North By-Election 29 November 2007
Party	Candidate	Votes	%	±%
Labour	Jonathan Burns	603	41.6	−9.8
Liberal Democrats	Rhoda Morley	566	39.1	+21.3
Conservative	David Harris	280	19.3	−11.5
Majority		37	2.5	
Turnout		1,449	18.2	
Labour hold		Swing		

=== 2010-2014 ===
Norden By-Election 25 April 2013
Party	Candidate	Votes	%	±%
Conservative	Peter Winkler	1,081	51.2	−6.0
Labour	Anthony Bennett	627	29.7	+3.0
Liberal Democrats	Patricia Colclough	246	11.7	−4.4
National Front	Peter Greenwood	156	7.4	+7.4
Majority		460	21.8	
Turnout		2,110		
Conservative hold		Swing		

=== 2022-2026 ===
North Middleton By-Election 31 October 2024
Party	Candidate	Votes	%	±%
Middleton Ind.	Keeley O'Mara	812	51.7	+8.3
Labour	Donna Martin	572	36.4	−11.9
Conservative	Sajid Majid	108	6.9	+0.3
Liberal Democrats	Iain Donaldson	80	5.1	+3.4
Majority		240	15.3	
Turnout		1,572		
Middleton Ind. hold		Swing		

Balderstone and Kirkholt By-Election 1 May 2025
Party	Candidate	Votes	%	±%
Reform	Jordan Tarrant-Short	766	32.5	+32.5
Labour	Leanne Greenwood	624	26.5	−26.4
Workers Party	Laura Pugh	398	16.9	−2.4
Conservative	Mudassar Razzaq	212	9.0	−5.5
Independent	Billy Howarth	180	7.6	+7.6
Liberal Democrats	Chariss Peacock	109	4.6	−1.3
Green	Martyn Savin	65	2.8	−4.5
Majority		142	6.0	
Turnout		2,354		
Reform gain from Labour		Swing		
