= 2019 Rochdale Metropolitan Borough Council election =

2019 local election in England

The 2019 Rochdale Metropolitan Borough Council election took place on 2 May 2019 to elect members of Rochdale Metropolitan Borough Council in England. This was on the same day as other local elections.

== Overall results ==
Vote share changes compared to 2018.

2019 Rochdale Metropolitan Borough Council election
Party	This election			Full council			This election		
Party	Seats	Net	Seats %	Other	Total	Total %	Votes	Votes %	+/−
Labour	16	▲1	80.0	31	47	78.3	23,461	49.36	-2.73
Conservative	3	▼1	15.0	6	9	15.0	10,110	21.27	-5.70
Liberal Democrats	1	Steady	5.0	3	4	6.7	5,156	10.85	-2.17
UKIP	0	Steady	0.0	0	0	0.0	7,069	14.87	+10.93
Green	0	Steady	0.0	0	0	0.0	1,731	3.64	+2.34

== Ward results ==
Councillors seeking re-election are marked with an asterisk; they were last elected in 2015 and changes are compared to that year's election.

=== Balderstone & Kirkholt ===
Balderstone & Kirkholt
Party	Candidate	Votes	%	±%
Labour	Daniel Joseph Meredith*	880	45.0	−1.4
UKIP	Guy Bradley	380	19.4	−5.7
Liberal Democrats	Patricia Ann Colclough	369	18.9	+9.1
Conservative	John Kershaw	204	10.4	−4.6
Green	James O'Meara	124	6.3	+2.7
Majority		500	25.5	+4.5
Turnout		1,957	25	
Labour hold		Swing	+2.15	

=== Bamford ===
Bamford
Party	Candidate	Votes	%	±%
Conservative	Patricia Sullivan*	1,499	47.8	+7.5
Labour	Mohammad Arshad	1,048	33.4	+1.9
UKIP	Stephen Sanderson	251	8.0	−12.2
Green	Sarah Croke	199	6.3	n/a
Liberal Democrats	Barrie Nicholson	140	4.5	−3.5
Majority		451	14.4	+5.6
Turnout		3,137	41	
Conservative hold		Swing	+2.8	

=== Castleton ===
Castleton
Party	Candidate	Votes	%	±%
Labour	Jean Gladys Hornby*	1,035	47.5	+3.9
Conservative	Michael Cullen	481	22.1	+7.7
UKIP	Mark Izzo	375	17.2	−13.9
Green	Jonathan Kershaw	197	9.0	+5.4
Liberal Democrats	Stephen Thornley	91	4.2	−3.1
Majority		554	25.4	+12.9
Turnout		2,179	28	
Labour hold		Swing	-1.9	

=== Central Rochdale ===
Central Rochdale
Party	Candidate	Votes	%	±%
Labour	Ali Ahmed*	2,292	78.7	+35.1
Liberal Democrats	Rifat Mahmood	422	14.5	n/a
Conservative	Roger Howarth	200	6.9	+2.4
Majority		1,870	64.2	+29.3
Turnout		2,914	39	
Labour hold		Swing	+10.3	

=== East Middleton ===
East Middleton
Party	Candidate	Votes	%	±%
Labour	Donna Martin*	1,162	57.4	+7.5
UKIP	Robert Mudd	520	25.7	−4.0
Conservative	Jacqueline Holt	342	16.9	−0.6
Majority		642	31.7	+11.4
Turnout		2,143	26	
Labour hold		Swing	+5.75	

=== Healey ===
Healey
Party	Candidate	Votes	%	±%
Labour	Shah Wazir*	1,190	46.2	+14.6
Conservative	Robert McLean	582	22.6	−6.2
UKIP	Fredrick Willis	440	17.1	−8.9
Liberal Democrats	John Rogers	365	14.2	+5.2
Majority		608	23.6	+20.7
Turnout		2,577	33	
Labour hold		Swing	+10.4	

=== Hopwood Hall ===
Hopwood Hall
Party	Candidate	Votes	%	±%
Labour	Susan Emmott*	1,095	51.5	+6.8
UKIP	Angela Gardner	572	26.9	−8.0
Conservative	Paul Ellison	460	21.6	+7.2
Majority		523	24.6	+14.8
Turnout		2,127	25	
Labour hold		Swing	+7.4	

=== Kingsway ===
Kingsway
Party	Candidate	Votes	%	±%
Labour	Elsie Wraighte	1,778	70.2	+11.7
Green	Mark Hollinrake	268	10.6	+6.9
Conservative	Richard Duckworth	267	10.5	+3.5
Liberal Democrats	Anthony Hughes	221	8.7	+0.7
Majority		1,510	59.6	+20.6
Turnout		2,534	29	
Labour hold		Swing	+2.4	

=== Littleborough Lakeside ===
Littleborough Lakeside
Party	Candidate	Votes	%	±%
Labour	Tom Besford	879	34.7	+2.3
Conservative	Ann Stott*	687	27.1	−7.9
Liberal Democrats	Kathryn Clegg	433	17.1	n/a
UKIP	Stephen Mitchell	336	13.3	−11.1
Green	Stuart Howard-Cofield	196	7.7	+1.2
Majority		192	7.6	
Turnout		2,532	32	
Labour gain from Conservative		Swing	+5.1	

=== Mikstone & Deeplish ===
Milkstone & Deeplish
Party	Candidate	Votes	%	±%
Labour	Mohammed Zaman*	2,142	83.8	+6.1
Liberal Democrats	Richard Eden-Maughan	145	5.7	−0.4
Green	Feruz Ali	134	5.2	+2.4
Conservative	Keith Taylor	134	5.2	+0.3
Majority		1,997	78.2	+9.0
Turnout		2,555	33	
Labour hold		Swing	+3.25	

=== Milnrow & Newhey ===
Milnrow & Newhey
Party	Candidate	Votes	%	±%
Liberal Democrats	Andy Kelly*	1,714	60.0	+21.2
Labour	Neil Butterworth	595	20.8	−4.1
UKIP	Hillary Smith	362	12.7	−6.3
Conservative	George Carpenter	184	6.4	−7.2
Majority		1,119	39.2	+25.3
Turnout		2,855	36	
Liberal Democrats hold		Swing	+12.65	

=== Norden ===
Norden
Party	Candidate	Votes	%	±%
Conservative	Peter Winkler*	1,428	55.2	+8.7
Labour	Shaukat Ali	483	18.7	−1.7
UKIP	Beverley Taylor-King	270	10.4	−13.6
Liberal Democrats	Nigel Sarbutts	218	8.4	+3.4
Green	Adam Mir	187	7.2	+3.2
Majority		945	36.5	+14.0
Turnout		2,586	33	
Conservative hold		Swing	+5.2	

=== North Heywood ===
North Heywood
Party	Candidate	Votes	%	±%
Labour	Ray Dutton*	968	54.8	+16.7
UKIP	Bernard Akin	526	29.8	−1.6
Conservative	Adrian Coan	274	15.5	+7.0
Majority		442	25.0	+18.3
Turnout		17.68	23	
Labour hold		Swing	+9.15	

=== North Middleton ===
North Middleton
Party	Candidate	Votes	%	±%
Labour	Sara Louise Rowbotham*	1,061	54.8	+3.8
UKIP	Thomas Barnes	592	30.6	−2.4
Conservative	Rachel McLachlan	284	14.7	+1.9
Majority		469	24.2	+6.3
Turnout		1,937	25	
Labour hold		Swing	+3.1	

=== Smallbridge & Firgrove ===
Smallbridge & Firgrove
Party	Candidate	Votes	%	±%
Labour	Aftab Hussain*	1,335	58.7	+11.9
UKIP	Laurent Baudry	410	18.0	−12.0
Liberal Democrats	Eleanor Kelly	294	12.9	+9.2
Conservative	Keith Branton	234	10.3	+0.1
Majority		925	40.7	+23.5
Turnout		2,273	28	
Labour hold		Swing	+11.95	

=== South Middleton ===
South Middleton
Party	Candidate	Votes	%	±%
Labour	Peter Williams*	1,184	47.7	+5.6
Conservative	Stephen Anstee	648	26.1	+2.8
UKIP	Philip Partington	440	17.7	−9.5
Liberal Democrats	Sue Curzon	212	8.5	+5.0
Majority		536	21.6	+6.7
Turnout		2,484	32	
Labour hold		Swing	+1.4	

=== Spotland & Falinge ===
Spotland & Falinge
Party	Candidate	Votes	%	±%
Labour	Rachel Massey	1,692	61.7	+14.4
Conservative	Steven Scholes	429	15.6	+1.8
Green	Mick Coats	426	15.5	+10.5
Liberal Democrats	Joseph Marsden	196	7.1	−1.7
Majority		1,263	46.0	+20.5
Turnout		2,743	33	
Labour hold		Swing	+6.3	

=== Wardle & West Littleborough ===
Wardle & West Littleborough
Party	Candidate	Votes	%	±%
Conservative	Rina Paolucci-Escobar*	1,213	49.2	+3.6
Labour	Julian Farnell	595	24.1	+0.9
Liberal Democrats	Robert Clegg	336	13.6	+7.4
UKIP	Robert Neave	320	13.0	−7.6
Majority		618	25.1	+2.7
Turnout		2,464	31	
Conservative hold		Swing	+1.35	

=== West Heywood ===
West Heywood
Party	Candidate	Votes	%	±%
Labour	Jacqui Beswick*	958	49.3	+1.1
UKIP	Michael O'Brien	699	36.0	+1.7
Conservative	Darren Bayman	287	14.8	+2.9
Majority		259	13.3	−0.6
Turnout		1,944	22	
Labour hold		Swing	-0.3	

=== West Middleton ===
West Middleton
Party	Candidate	Votes	%	±%
Labour	Philip Burke*	1,089	56.2	−1.0
UKIP	Lee Seville	576	29.7	+1.1
Conservative	Andrew Neilson	273	14.1	+4.6
Majority		513	26.5	−2.1
Turnout		1,938	21	
Labour hold		Swing	-1.05	

== By-elections and other changes ==
Councillor Alan McCarthy (elected 2018 for Labour in the West Heywood ward) defected from Labour to the Brexit Party on 4 July 2019. Joined Conservative Party June 2021

Councillor Jacqui Beswick (elected 2019 for Labour in the West Heywood ward) resigned from the Labour Party on 4 July 2019 to sit as an independent. Joined Conservative Party June 2021

Councillor Kath Nickson (elected 2018 for Labour in the Balderstone & Kirkholt ward) defected from the Liberal Democrats to the Brexit Party on 10 July 2019. Now sits as Conservative

Former council leader Richard Farnell (elected 2016 for Labour in the Balderstone & Kirkholt ward) resigned from the Labour Party on 18 July 2019 to sit as an independent. He had been suspended since April 2018 after a national child abuse inquiry found he lied under oath. In a statement he said he had "no confidence" he would receive a fair disciplinary hearing and could "no longer support a party led by Jeremy Corbyn".
