= 2004 Rochdale Metropolitan Borough Council election =

2004 UK local government election

Elections to Rochdale Council were held on 10 June 2004. The whole council was up for election with boundary changes since the last election in 2003. The council stayed under no overall control.

== Results summary ==
Rochdale Metropolitan Borough Council election, 2004
Party	Candidates						Votes		
Party	Stood	Elected	Gained	Unseated	Net	% of total	%	No.	Net %
Liberal Democrats	48	25	–	–	▲2	41.7%	39.7	64,870	▲3.6%
Labour	60	24	–	–	▼6	40%	33.9	55,457	▼3.9%
Conservative	42	11	–	–	▲3	18.3%	25.6	41,787	Steady
BNP	1	0	–	–	Steady	0%	0.5	779	N/A
Liberal	1	0	–	–	Steady	0%	0.4	575	Steady

== Ward results ==
Balderstone and Kirkholt (3)
Party	Candidate	Votes	%	±%
Labour	Alan Brett	1,151	16.9	
Labour	Darren Pedley	1,062	15.6	
Labour	Angela Robinson	1,021	15.0	
Conservative	Linda Butler	785	11.5	
Conservative	Richard Rudd	705	10.3	
Conservative	Paula Devlin	654	9.6	
Liberal Democrats	John Townson	527	7.7	
Liberal Democrats	Hilary Rogers	489	7.2	
Liberal Democrats	Drakzai Khan	414	6.1	
Turnout		6,808	36.4	

Bamford (3)
Party	Candidate	Votes	%	±%
Conservative	Jane Gartside	1,897	17.8	
Conservative	Ian Duckworth	1,650	15.5	
Conservative	William Hobhouse	1,591	15.0	
Liberal Democrats	Crea Lavin	1,407	13.2	
Liberal Democrats	Gregory Couzens	1,319	12.4	
Liberal Democrats	John Swarbrick	1,235	11.6	
Labour	Rita Knight	539	5.1	
Labour	Pauline Freeman	513	4.8	
Labour	Neil Emmott	468	4.4	
Turnout		10,625	51.3	

Castleton (3)
Party	Candidate	Votes	%	±%
Liberal Democrats	Patricia Flynn	1,852	20.6	
Liberal Democrats	James Flynn	1,814	20.2	
Liberal Democrats	Peter Davison	1,713	19.1	
Labour	Peter Dawson	663	7.4	
Labour	Andrew Butler	660	7.3	
Labour	Stephen Griffiths	658	7.3	
Conservative	Cecilia Crossley	552	6.1	
Conservative	Ronald Crossley	548	6.1	
Conservative	Bonnar Coleano	519	5.8	
Turnout		8,979	42.3	

Central Rochdale (3)
Party	Candidate	Votes	%	±%
Liberal Democrats	Zulfiqar Ali	2,144	20.4	
Liberal Democrats	Khalid Mahmood	2,130	20.3	
Liberal Democrats	Shah Wazir	2,096	20.0	
Labour	Jack Butterworth	1,313	12.5	
Labour	Hellal Choudhury	1,179	11.2	
Labour	Farooq Ahmed	1,116	10.6	
Conservative	Roger Howarth	513	4.9	
Turnout		10,491	56.0	

East Middleton (3)
Party	Candidate	Votes	%	±%
Liberal Democrats	Clarice Cooper	1,232	27.1	
Labour	Anne Murphy	1,189	26.2	
Labour	David Murphy	1,144	25.2	
Labour	James Moran	978	21.5	
Turnout		4,543	32.9	

Healey (3)
Party	Candidate	Votes	%	±%
Liberal Democrats	Thomas Bailey	2,037	20.5	
Liberal Democrats	Robert Watkins	1,775	17.9	
Liberal Democrats	Anne Taylor	1,763	17.7	
Conservative	Andrew Neilson	1,141	11.5	
Conservative	Leonard Branton	920	9.2	
Conservative	Keith Taylor	888	8.9	
Labour	Christine Taylor	588	5.9	
Labour	Moshahid Hussain	436	4.4	
Labour	Mohammed Mia	388	3.9	
Turnout		9,936	47.5	

Hopwood Hall (3)
Party	Candidate	Votes	%	±%
Labour	Linda Robinson	1,437	19.6	
Labour	Susan Emmott	1,411	19.2	
Labour	Carol Wardle	1,376	18.7	
Conservative	Peter Burt	1,133	15.4	
Liberal Democrats	Peter Brierley	680	9.3	
Liberal Democrats	Malcolm Heard	678	9.2	
Liberal Democrats	Neil Lever	623	8.5	
Turnout		7,338	39.6	

Kingsway (3)
Party	Candidate	Votes	%	±%
Liberal Democrats	David Clayton	1,557	14.7	
Labour	Lynn Brosnan	1,493	14.1	
Labour	Thomas Stott	1,344	12.7	
Labour	Abdul Chowdry	1,276	12.0	
Liberal Democrats	Christine Akram	1,226	11.6	
Liberal Democrats	Faheem Akram	1,127	10.6	
Conservative	Michael Butler	976	9.2	
Conservative	Heidi Jepson	831	7.8	
Conservative	Mudassar Razzaq	756	7.1	
Turnout		10,586	57.6	

Littleborough Lakeside (3)
Party	Candidate	Votes	%	±%
Liberal Democrats	Peter Evans	1,613	18.2	
Liberal Democrats	Rosemary Jones	1,477	16.7	
Liberal Democrats	Pauline Maguire	1,399	15.8	
Conservative	Frank Mills	1,085	12.3	
Conservative	Peter Lord	1,076	12.2	
Conservative	Janet Darnborough	919	10.4	
Labour	Alan Blacker	451	5.1	
Labour	Vera Lomax	420	4.7	
Labour	Derek Snowden	407	4.6	
Turnout		8,847	42.0	

Milkstone and Deeplish (3)
Party	Candidate	Votes	%	±%
Liberal Democrats	Mohammad Sharif	2,659	23.7	
Liberal Democrats	Paul Rowen	2,561	22.8	
Liberal Democrats	Angela Croric	2,382	21.2	
Labour	Sultan Ali	1,219	10.9	
Labour	Amna Mir	1,002	8.9	
Labour	Ghulum Nawaz	977	8.7	
Conservative	John Critten	218	1.9	
Conservative	John Kershaw	200	1.8	
Turnout		11,218	57.6	

Milnrow and Newhey (3)
Party	Candidate	Votes	%	±%
Liberal Democrats	Irene Davidson	1,802	20.1	
Liberal Democrats	John Swift	1,487	17.1	
Liberal Democrats	Denis Kershaw-Whittle	1,447	16.6	
Conservative	Allan Marshall	936	10.7	
Labour	Geoffrey Coady	654	7.5	
Labour	Peter Corby	630	7.2	
Labour	John Ingham	595	6.8	
Conservative	Susan Heywood	580	6.7	
Conservative	Stephen Jones	572	6.6	
Turnout		8,703	43.0	

Norden (3)
Party	Candidate	Votes	%	±%
Conservative	James Gartside	1,885	20.2	
Conservative	Anne Metcalfe	1,717	18.4	
Conservative	Wera Reden-Hobhouse	1,334	14.3	
Liberal Democrats	Bernard Rostron	1,173	12.5	
Liberal Democrats	Beryl Rostron	1,115	11.9	
Liberal Democrats	Richard Todd	881	9.4	
Labour	David Finley	504	5.4	
Labour	Helmut Izaks	389	4.2	
Labour	Ali Khalid	351	3.7	
Turnout		9,349	45.3	

North Heywood (3)
Party	Candidate	Votes	%	±%
Labour	Brian Davies	1,278	20.6	
Labour	Jean Hornby	957	15.4	
Labour	Nicholas Maher	912	14.7	
Liberal Democrats	Peter Rush	842	13.5	
Liberal Democrats	Maureen Sullivan	833	13.4	
Liberal Democrats	Walter Lomax	753	12.1	
Conservative	Rachel McLachlan	639	10.3	
Turnout		6,214	36.9	

North Middleton (3)
Party	Candidate	Votes	%	±%
Labour	Maureen Rowbotham	1,107	23.2	
Labour	Alan Godson	1,019	21.3	
Labour	Ian Robertson	956	20.0	
Liberal Democrats	Albert Sullivan	885	18.5	
Conservative	Paul Spilling	810	16.9	
Turnout		4,777	32.4	

Smallbridge and Firgrove (3)
Party	Candidate	Votes	%	±%
Liberal Democrats	Jean Ashworth	1,151	16.5	
Liberal Democrats	Brenda Kerslake	949	13.6	
Labour	Lorraine Butterworth	909	13.0	
Liberal Democrats	Mushtaq Ahmed	845	12.1	
Labour	Robin Parker	741	10.6	
Labour	Surrinder Biant	700	10.0	
Conservative	Bernard Schofield	599	8.6	
Conservative	Michael Smith	555	7.9	
Conservative	Colin Darnbrough	536	7.7	
Turnout		6.985	36.9	

South Middleton (3)
Party	Candidate	Votes	%	±%
Conservative	Mary Fitzsimons	1,607	16.6	
Conservative	Vincent Mannion	1,576	16.3	
Labour	Peter Williams	1,574	16.2	
Labour	Donna Martin	1,532	15.8	
Labour	James Brown	1,406	14.5	
Conservative	Conal Brophy	1,236	12.8	
Liberal Democrats	Hillary Murray	752	7.8	
Turnout		9,683	48.1	

Spotland and Falinge (3)
Party	Candidate	Votes	%	±%
Liberal Democrats	Barbara Todd	2,146	24.3	
Liberal Democrats	Rodney Stott	2,123	24.0	
Liberal Democrats	Peter Clegg	2,031	23.0	
Labour	Michael Coats	770	8.7	
Labour	Colin Thompson	616	7.0	
Conservative	Stephen Scholes	595	6.7	
Labour	Francis Dignan	560	6.3	
Turnout		8,841	44.1	

Wardle and West Littleborough (3)
Party	Candidate	Votes	%	±%
Conservative	Ashley Dearnley	2,188	25.6	
Conservative	Joyce Wright	1,708	20.0	
Conservative	Robert Clegg	1,666	19.5	
Liberal Democrats	Kieran Clarke	820	9.6	
Labour	Milorad Radanovic	488	5.7	
Liberal Democrats	Joy Gerber	471	5.5	
Liberal Democrats	Dagmar Hilton	435	5.1	
Labour	Pauline Mann	391	4.6	
Labour	Stewart Robinson	378	4.4	
Turnout		8,545	40.9	

West Heywood (3)
Party	Candidate	Votes	%	±%
Labour	Colin Lambert	1,414	24.4	
Labour	Jacqueline Beswick	1,402	24.2	
Labour	Alan McCarthy	1,315	22.7	
Conservative	William Payne	885	15.3	
BNP	Martin Littler	779	13.4	
Turnout		5,795	35.2	

West Middleton (3)
Party	Candidate	Votes	%	±%
Labour	Lily Murphy	1,408	27.0	
Labour	Terry Smith	1,372	26.3	
Labour	Eric Noi	1,250	24.0	
Conservative	Susan Powson	606	11.6	
Liberal	Phillip Burke	575	11.0	
Turnout		5,211	33.8	
