= 2015 Rochdale Metropolitan Borough Council election =

2015 local election in England

The 2015 Rochdale Metropolitan Borough Council election took place on 7 May 2015 to elect one third of the members of Rochdale Metropolitan Borough Council in England. This took place on the same day as the 2015 General Election and other local elections.

The Labour Party retained control of the council.

After the election, the composition of the council was:

- Labour 47
- Conservative 10
- Liberal Democrat 2
- Independent (Rochdale First) 1

== Election result ==
Rochdale local election result 2015
| Party | Seats | Gains | Losses | Net gain/loss | Seats % | Votes % | Votes | +/− |
|---|---|---|---|---|---|---|---|---|
| Labour | 15 | 2 | 1 | +1 | | 42.6 | 40,304 | -3.4 |
| UKIP | 0 | 0 | 0 | 0 | | 25.4 | 24,060 | +8.3 |
| Conservative | 4 | 0 | 1 | -1 | | 19.6 | 18,518 | -1.1 |
| Liberal Democrats | 1 | 1 | 1 | +1 | | 7.5 | 7,077 | -2.6 |
| Green | 0 | 0 | 0 | 0 | | 3.0 | 2,860 | +0.2 |
| TUSC | 0 | 0 | 0 | 0 | | 0.1 | 69 | +0.1 |
| Independent | 0 | 0 | 1 | -1 | | 1.8 | 1,684 | -1.5 |

== Ward results ==
The electoral division results listed below are based on the changes from the 2014 elections, not taking into account any mid-term by-elections or party defections.

=== Balderstone & Kirkholt ward ===
Balderstone & Kirkholt
| Party | Candidate | Votes | % | ±% |
|---|---|---|---|---|
| Labour | Daniel Joseph Meredith | 1,786 | 46.4 | −3.0 |
| UKIP | Cathie Cox | 968 | 25.1 | −5.3 |
| Conservative | Jacqueline Holt | 579 | 15.0 | +3.1 |
| Liberal Democrats | Patricia Ann Colclough | 379 | 9.8 | +1.5 |
| Green | Neil Rutter | 140 | 3.6 | +3.6 |
| Majority | | 818 | 21.3 | −15.9 |
| Turnout | | 3,852 | | |
| Labour hold | | Swing | +1.2 | |

=== Bamford ward ===
Bamford
| Party | Candidate | Votes | % | ±% |
|---|---|---|---|---|
| Conservative | Patricia Sullivan | 2,110 | 40.3 | −17.6 |
| Labour | Kewal Kataria | 1,650 | 31.5 | +4.9 |
| UKIP | Julie Baker | 1,056 | 20.2 | +20.2 |
| Liberal Democrats | Peter Clegg | 417 | 8.0 | −14.6 |
| Majority | | 460 | 8.8 | −22.5 |
| Turnout | | 5,233 | | |
| Conservative hold | | Swing | -11.3 | |

=== Castleton ward ===
Castleton
| Party | Candidate | Votes | % | ±% |
|---|---|---|---|---|
| Labour | Jean Gladys Hornby | 2,018 | 43.6 | −0.1 |
| UKIP | Stephen Sanderson | 1,438 | 31.1 | +31.1 |
| Conservative | Ronald Crossley | 665 | 14.4 | −3.5 |
| Liberal Democrats | Anthony Smith | 340 | 7.3 | −3.2 |
| Green | Jonathan Kershaw | 166 | 3.6 | +3.6 |
| Majority | | 580 | 12.5 | −3.3 |
| Turnout | | 4,627 | | |
| Labour hold | | Swing | +15.6 | |

=== Central Rochdale ward ===
Central Rochdale
| Party | Candidate | Votes | % | ±% |
|---|---|---|---|---|
| Labour | Ali Ahmed | 2,455 | 57.9 | −21.6 |
| Independent | Farooq Ahmed | 972 | 22.9 | +22.9 |
| UKIP | Angela Gardner | 473 | 11.1 | +11.1 |
| Conservative | Roger Howarth | 193 | 4.5 | −1.6 |
| Independent | Andy Littlewood | 80 | 1.9 | −5.2 |
| TUSC | David Fenwick-Finn | 69 | 1.6 | +1.6 |
| Majority | | 1,483 | 34.9 | −37.4 |
| Turnout | | 4,242 | | |
| Labour gain from Independent | | Swing | | |

=== East Middleton ward ===
East Middleton
| Party | Candidate | Votes | % | ±% |
|---|---|---|---|---|
| Labour | Donna Martin | 2,371 | 49.9 | +2.8 |
| UKIP | Ronald Broadley Ashworth | 1,409 | 29.7 | −2.6 |
| Conservative | Teresa Fitzsimons | 832 | 17.5 | +1.8 |
| Liberal Democrats | John Smith | 135 | 2.8 | −2.0 |
| Majority | | 962 | 20.3 | +5.5 |
| Turnout | | 4,747 | | |
| Labour hold | | Swing | +0.1 | |

=== Healey ward ===
Healey
| Party | Candidate | Votes | % | ±% |
|---|---|---|---|---|
| Labour | Shah Wazir | 1,640 | 31.6 | −2.8 |
| Conservative | Andrew Neilson | 1,491 | 28.8 | −0.6 |
| UKIP | Maureen Kershaw | 1,348 | 26.0 | +1.8 |
| Liberal Democrats | John Rogers | 468 | 9.0 | +1.8 |
| Green | A J Rennie | 235 | 4.5 | −0.4 |
| Majority | | 149 | 2.9 | −1.1 |
| Turnout | | 5,182 | | |
| Labour hold | | Swing | -1.1 | |

=== Hopwood Hall ward ===
Hopwood Hall
| Party | Candidate | Votes | % | ±% |
|---|---|---|---|---|
| Labour | Susan Emmott | 2,203 | 44.7 | −7.2 |
| UKIP | Michael Foster | 1,720 | 34.9 | +3.6 |
| Conservative | Karen Winkler | 709 | 14.4 | +1.6 |
| Liberal Democrats | Tony MacSparran | 146 | 3.0 | −0.9 |
| Green | Naomi Southwell | 145 | 3.0 | +3.0 |
| Majority | | 483 | 9.8 | −10.8 |
| Turnout | | 4,923 | | |
| Labour hold | | Swing | -5.4 | |

=== Kingsway ward ===
Kingsway
| Party | Candidate | Votes | % | ±% |
|---|---|---|---|---|
| Labour | Lynne Brosnan | 2,750 | 58.5 | −7.8 |
| UKIP | Christine Akram | 917 | 19.5 | +19.5 |
| Liberal Democrats | David Clayton | 377 | 8.0 | −3.1 |
| Conservative | John Kershaw | 337 | 7.2 | −3.2 |
| Green | Mark Hollinrake | 172 | 3.7 | −8.5 |
| Independent | Mohamed Janjua | 149 | 3.2 | +3.2 |
| Majority | | 1,833 | 39.0 | −39.3 |
| Turnout | | 4,702 | | |
| Labour hold | | Swing | -13.7 | |

=== Littleborough Lakeside ward ===
Littleborough Lakeside
| Party | Candidate | Votes | % | ±% |
|---|---|---|---|---|
| Conservative | Ann Stott | 1,656 | 35.0 | +7.0 |
| Labour | Graham Haynes | 1,542 | 32.6 | −4.2 |
| UKIP | Ed Aadahl | 1,156 | 24.4 | −3.3 |
| Green | Glynis Coats | 307 | 6.5 | +2.1 |
| Independent | Dave Felton | 74 | 1.6 | +1.6 |
| Majority | | 114 | 2.4 | |
| Turnout | | 4,735 | | |
| Conservative hold | | Swing | +5.6 | |

=== Milkstone & Deeplish ward ===
Milkstone & Deeplish
| Party | Candidate | Votes | % | ±% |
|---|---|---|---|---|
| Labour | Mohammed Zaman | 3,335 | 77.7 | +10.5 |
| UKIP | Rifat Mahmood | 364 | 8.5 | +2.4 |
| Liberal Democrats | John Swarbrick | 260 | 6.1 | +2.0 |
| Conservative | Keith Taylor | 211 | 4.9 | −9.0 |
| Green | Sarah Bibi | 120 | 2.8 | +2.8 |
| Majority | | 2,971 | 69.2 | +17.6 |
| Turnout | | 4,290 | | |
| Labour hold | | Swing | +4.1 | |

=== Milnrow & Newhey ward ===
Milnrow & Newhey
| Party | Candidate | Votes | % | ±% |
|---|---|---|---|---|
| Liberal Democrats | Andy Kelly | 2,013 | 38.8 | +2.9 |
| Labour | Martin Eric Rodgers | 1,293 | 24.9 | −11.4 |
| UKIP | Michael O'Brien | 984 | 19.0 | +19.0 |
| Conservative | James Conboy | 708 | 13.6 | −4.7 |
| Green | James Ashworth | 186 | 3.6 | −1.2 |
| Majority | | 720 | 13.9 | |
| Turnout | | 5,184 | | |
| Liberal Democrats gain from Labour | | Swing | +7.2 | |

=== Norden ward ===
Norden
| Party | Candidate | Votes | % | ±% |
|---|---|---|---|---|
| Conservative | Peter Winkler | 2,490 | 46.5 | +5.2 |
| UKIP | Graeme Kerby | 1,285 | 24.0 | +0.3 |
| Labour | Ruth Yasmeen | 1,091 | 20.4 | −3.2 |
| Liberal Democrats | Monica Rush | 268 | 5.0 | −1.6 |
| Green | Joseph Ashworth | 217 | 4.0 | −0.8 |
| Majority | | 1,205 | 22.5 | +4.9 |
| Turnout | | 5,351 | | |
| Conservative hold | | Swing | +2.5 | |

=== North Heywood ward ===
North Heywood
| Party | Candidate | Votes | % | ±% |
|---|---|---|---|---|
| Labour | Ray Dutton | 1,626 | 38.1 | +3.1 |
| UKIP | Paul Towriss | 1,340 | 31.4 | +10.0 |
| Liberal Democrats | Peter Malcolm | 831 | 19.4 | −19.4 |
| Conservative | Anne Shorrock | 362 | 8.5 | +3.8 |
| Green | Warren Smith | 113 | 2.6 | +2.6 |
| Majority | | 286 | 6.7 | |
| Turnout | | 4,272 | | |
| Labour hold | | Swing | -3.5 | |

=== North Middleton ward ===
North Middleton
| Party | Candidate | Votes | % | ±% |
|---|---|---|---|---|
| Labour | Sara Louise Rowbotham | 2,336 | 51.0 | +10.2 |
| UKIP | David Winder | 1,514 | 33.0 | −4.3 |
| Conservative | Barbara Braiden | 586 | 12.8 | −0.3 |
| Liberal Democrats | Frank Cooper | 147 | 3.2 | +0.6 |
| Majority | | 822 | 17.9 | +14.5 |
| Turnout | | 4,583 | | |
| Labour hold | | Swing | +7.3 | |

=== Smallbridge & Firgrove ward ===
Smallbridge & Firgrove
| Party | Candidate | Votes | % | ±% |
|---|---|---|---|---|
| Labour | Aftab Hussain | 1,933 | 46.8 | −21.0 |
| UKIP | Neville Westerman | 1,221 | 30.0 | +30.0 |
| Conservative | Keith Branton | 423 | 10.2 | −8.4 |
| Green | Marie Munoz | 261 | 6.3 | +6.3 |
| Liberal Democrats | Joe O'Neil | 155 | 3.7 | −9.9 |
| Independent | Mohammed Abdul Hamid | 134 | 3.2 | +3.2 |
| Majority | | 712 | 17.2 | −32.0 |
| Turnout | | 4,127 | | |
| Labour hold | | Swing | -25.5 | |

=== South Middleton ward ===
South Middleton
| Party | Candidate | Votes | % | ±% |
|---|---|---|---|---|
| Labour | Peter Williams | 2,322 | 42.1 | +0.2 |
| UKIP | Richard Whittaker | 1,500 | 27.2 | +0.5 |
| Conservative | Bernard Braiden | 1,284 | 23.3 | +0.1 |
| Green | Abi Jackson | 214 | 3.9 | −1.2 |
| Liberal Democrats | John Wilkins | 191 | 3.5 | +0.5 |
| Majority | | 822 | 14.9 | −0.3 |
| Turnout | | 5,511 | | |
| Labour hold | | Swing | -0.2 | |

=== Spotland & Falinge ward ===
Spotland & Falinge
| Party | Candidate | Votes | % | ±% |
|---|---|---|---|---|
| Labour | Cecile Biant | 2,214 | 47.3 | +3.7 |
| UKIP | Sajid Ali | 1,022 | 21.8 | +0.8 |
| Conservative | Steven Scholes | 644 | 13.8 | +3.8 |
| Liberal Democrats | Jack Rawstron | 411 | 8.8 | +2.3 |
| Green | Mick Coats | 235 | 5.0 | +5.0 |
| Independent | Emily Bannister | 155 | 3.3 | +3.3 |
| Majority | | 1,192 | 25.5 | +2.9 |
| Turnout | | 4,681 | | |
| Labour hold | | Swing | +1.5 | |

=== Wardle & West Littleborough ward ===
Wardle & West Littleborough
| Party | Candidate | Votes | % | ±% |
|---|---|---|---|---|
| Conservative | Rina Paolucci | 2,215 | 45.6 | −15.1 |
| Labour | Beverley Place | 1,125 | 23.2 | +0.5 |
| UKIP | William Candlin | 1,002 | 20.6 | +20.6 |
| Liberal Democrats | Joe Kelly | 302 | 6.2 | +1.5 |
| Green | Fearn Thomas | 213 | 4.4 | −7.4 |
| Majority | | 1,090 | 22.4 | −15.4 |
| Turnout | | 4,857 | | |
| Conservative hold | | Swing | -7.8 | |

=== West Heywood ward ===
West Heywood
| Party | Candidate | Votes | % | ±% |
|---|---|---|---|---|
| Labour | Jacqui Beswick | 2,353 | 48.2 | +5.0 |
| UKIP | Warren Mitchell | 1,675 | 34.3 | −8.0 |
| Conservative | Jane Howard | 581 | 11.9 | +1.5 |
| Liberal Democrats | Derrick Drysdale | 143 | 2.9 | −1.2 |
| Green | David Coats | 128 | 2.6 | +2.6 |
| Majority | | 678 | 13.9 | +12.9 |
| Turnout | | 4,880 | | |
| Labour hold | | Swing | +6.5 | |

=== West Middleton ward ===
West Middleton
| Party | Candidate | Votes | % | ±% |
|---|---|---|---|---|
| Labour | Philip Burke | 2,651 | 57.2 | +6.9 |
| UKIP | Lee Seville | 1,325 | 28.6 | −8.2 |
| Conservative | Rachel McLachlan | 442 | 9.5 | +2.0 |
| Green | Alan Cocking | 128 | 2.8 | +2.8 |
| Liberal Democrats | Dave Elder | 88 | 1.9 | −3.5 |
| Majority | | 1.326 | 28.6 | +15.2 |
| Turnout | | 4,634 | | |
| Labour hold | | Swing | +7.4 | |
