= 2018 Rochdale Metropolitan Borough Council election =

2018 local election in England

Map showing the results of the 2018 Rochdale Metropolitan Borough Council election

The 2018 Rochdale Borough Council election took place on 3 May 2018 to elect members of Rochdale Borough Council in England. This was on the same day as other local elections.

== Overall result ==
Vote share changes compared to 2016.

2018 Rochdale Metropolitan Borough Council election
Party	This election			Full council			This election		
Party	Seats	Net	Seats %	Other	Total	Total %	Votes	Votes %	+/−
Labour	16		80.0	31	47	78.3	26,250	52.09	
Conservative	3		15.0	7	10	16.7	13,590	26.97	
Liberal Democrats	1		5.0	2	3	5.0	6,558	13.01	
UKIP	0	Steady	0.0	0	0	0.0	1,989	3.95	
Independent	0	Steady	0.0	0	0	0.0	1,350	2.68	
Green	0	Steady	0.0	0	0	0.0	656	1.30	

== Ward results ==
=== Balderstone & Kirkholt ===
Balderstone & Kirkholt
Party	Candidate	Votes	%	±%
Labour	Kathleen Nickson	938	51.5	−8.7
Conservative	John Kershaw	427	23.5	+14.4
Liberal Democrats	Mark Alcock	368	20.2	+9.5
Green	Abdus Mir	87	4.8	+2.3

=== Bamford ===
Bamford
Party	Candidate	Votes	%	±%
Conservative	Angela Smith	1,713	52.1	+3.2
Labour	Martin Ayers	1357	41.3	+10.1
Liberal Democrats	Roy Thornsby	215	6.5	+0.7

=== Castleton ===
Castleton
Party	Candidate	Votes	%	±%
Labour	Aasim Rashid	1,008	41.3	−19.3
Conservative	Michael James Cullen	967	39.7	+30.8
Green	Jonathan Kershaw	158	6.5	+2.3
Independent	Brian Bamford	155	6.4	N/A
Liberal Democrats	Tony Hughes	150	6.2	N/A

=== Central Rochdale ===
Central Rochdale
Party	Candidate	Votes	%	±%
Labour	Sultan Ali	2,171	63.8	−16.2
Liberal Democrats	Zulfiqar Ali	974	28.6	+22.7
Conservative	Roger Howarth	185	5.4	+1.1
Green	Adam Mir	72	2.1	−1.3

=== East Middleton ===
East Middleton
Party	Candidate	Votes	%	±%
Labour	June West	1,303	61.7	+4.3
Conservative	Rebecca Howard	511	24.2	+10.9
UKIP	Robert Mudd	299	14.2	−15.2

=== Healey ===
Healey
Party	Candidate	Votes	%	±%
Labour	Kieran Heakin	1,252	44.8	+1.6
Conservative	Andrew Neilson	926	33.2	+4.6
Liberal Democrats	Robert McLean	486	17.4	+10.8
Green	AJ Rennie	128	4.6	+0.3

=== Hopwood Hall ===
Hopwood Hall
Party	Candidate	Votes	%	±%
Labour	Carol Wardle	1,185	55.3	+2.9
Conservative	Paul Ellison	659	30.8	+7.7
UKIP	Angela Gardner	299	14.0	−10.4

=== Kingsway ===
Kingsway
Party	Candidate	Votes	%	±%
Labour	Daalat Ali	1,911	64.0	−7.2
Liberal Democrats	David Clayton	730	24.5	+13.3
Conservative	Richard Duckworth	254	8.5	−1.9
Green	Firuz Ali	90	3.0	−4.3

=== Littleborough Lakeside ===
Littleborough Lakeside
Party	Candidate	Votes	%	±%
Labour	Janet Emsley	1,149	46.2	−1.0
Conservative	Keith Taylor	843	33.9	+9.2
Liberal Democrats	Zoe Attwood	496	19.9	+15.8

=== Mikstone & Deeplish ===
Mikstone & Deeplish
Party	Candidate	Votes	%	±%
Labour	Sameena Zaheer	2,402	86.6	+9.2
Liberal Democrats	Richard Eden-Maughan	209	7.5	−6.3
Conservative	Jacqueline Holt	162	5.8	+1.3

=== Milnrow & Newhey ===
Milnrow & Newhey
Party	Candidate	Votes	%	±%
Liberal Democrats	David Bamford	1,468	49.5	−1.2
Labour	Neil Butterworth	984	33.2	+6.7
Conservative	Edward Carpenter	511	17.2	+14.1

=== Norden ===
Norden
Party	Candidate	Votes	%	±%
Conservative	Mike Holly	1,646	62.0	+6.2
Labour	Anthony Bennett	738	27.8	+7.7
Liberal Democrats	John Farrington	150	5.6	+1.8
Green	Mick Coats	121	4.6	−0.9

=== North Heywood ===
North Heywood
Party	Candidate	Votes	%	±%
Labour	Peter Rush	1,188	64.3	−6.5
Conservative	Stephen Pritchard	339	18.4	+2.1
UKIP	Stephen Sanderson	232	12.6	N/A
Liberal Democrats	Sue Curzon	88	4.8	−8.1

=== North Middleton ===
North Middleton
Party	Candidate	Votes	%	±%
Labour	Kallum Nolan	1,113	52.3	−6.5
Independent	Keely O'Mara	343	16.1	N/A
UKIP	Thomas Barnes	304	14.3	−16.2
Conservative	Oliver Bleasdale	295	13.8	+3.0
Liberal Democrats	John Wilkins	75	3.5	N/A

=== Smallbridge & Firgrove ===
Smallbridge & Firgrove
Party	Candidate	Votes	%	±%
Labour	John Blundell	1,528	70.1	+14.7
Conservative	Leonard Branton	348	16.0	+5.7
Liberal Democrats	Eleanor Kelly	304	13.9	+3.4

=== South Middleton ===
South Middleton
Party	Candidate	Votes	%	±%
Labour	Patricia Dale	1,275	47.9	+1.3
Conservative	Andy Dale	1020	38.3	+16.2
UKIP	Richard Whitaker	222	8.3	−17.1
Liberal Democrats	Emma Griffin	146	5.5	+1.8

=== Spotland & Falinge ===
Spotland & Falinge
Party	Candidate	Votes	%	±%
Labour	Faisal Rana	1,777	56.0	+7.5
Independent	Carl Faulkner	852	26.9	+3.7
Conservative	Steven Scholes	303	9.5	+1.1
Liberal Democrats	James Earnshaw	241	7.6	−6.4

=== Wardle & West Littleborough ===
Wardle & West Littleborough
Party	Candidate	Votes	%	±%
Conservative	John Taylor	1,666	66.0	+6.4
Labour	Julian Farnell	614	24.3	+4.0
Liberal Democrats	Lynn Butterworth	243	9.6	+4.6

=== West Heywood ===
West Heywood
Party	Candidate	Votes	%	±%
Labour	Alan McCarthy	1,065	53.5	−4.0
Conservative	Rachel McLachlan	416	20.9	+10.1
UKIP	Michael O'Brien	293	14.7	−17.0
Liberal Democrats	Harry Mills	215	10.8	N/A

=== West Middleton ===
West Middleton
Party	Candidate	Votes	%	±%
Labour	Neil Emmott	1,292	63.6	−0.5
Conservative	Daniel Davidson	399	19.6	+12.7
UKIP	Lee Seville	340	16.7	−12.3

== By-elections and other changes ==
Kathleen Nickson of Balderstone and Kirkholt ward defected from Labour to the Liberal Democrats in January 2019, saying that the Labour leadership "told [me] what to do, what to say and how to vote."
