= 2003 Rochdale Metropolitan Borough Council election =

2003 UK local government election

Elections to Rochdale Council were held on 1 May 2003. One third of the council was up for election and the Labour Party lost overall control of the council to no overall control.

After the election, the composition of the council was:

- Labour: 30;
- Liberal Democrat: 22; and
- Conservative: 8.

== Election result ==
Rochdale local election result 2003
Party	Seats	Gains	Losses	Net gain/loss	Seats %	Votes %	Votes	+/−
Labour	10			-1	50.0	37.8	15,167	-7.0
Liberal Democrats	8			+1	40.0	36.1	14,475	+6.6
Conservative	2			0	10.0	25.6	10,248	+2.9
Liberal	0			0	0	0.4	163	+0.2
Christian Democratic Party	0			0	0	0.1	24	+0.0

== Ward results ==
Balderstone
Party	Candidate	Votes	%	±%
Labour	Frank Greenwood	806	49.7	−3.7
Conservative	Michael Greenwood	484	29.9	−3.1
Liberal Democrats	Stuart Sawle	331	20.4	+6.7
Majority		322	19.8	−0.6
Turnout		1,621		

Brimrod and Deeplish
Party	Candidate	Votes	%	±%
Liberal Democrats	Paul Rowen	1,505	70.3	+18.4
Labour	Nicholas Maher	481	22.5	−17.6
Conservative	William Hobhouse	154	7.2	−0.9
Majority		1,024	47.8	+36.0
Turnout		2,140		

Castleton
Party	Candidate	Votes	%	±%
Liberal Democrats	Patricia Flynn	1,205	56.2	+5.8
Labour	Jack Butterworth	647	30.2	−9.7
Conservative	Ronald Crossley	292	13.6	+3.9
Majority		558	26.0	+15.5
Turnout		2,144		

Central and Falinge
Party	Candidate	Votes	%	±%
Liberal Democrats	Mohammad Sharif	1,509	60.6	+33.3
Labour	Colin Thompson	809	32.5	−32.8
Conservative	Linda Butler	174	7.0	−0.5
Majority		700	28.1	
Turnout		2,492		

Central Middleton
Party	Candidate	Votes	%	±%
Labour	Angela Robinson	729	61.0	−9.6
Conservative	Craig Matthews	266	22.2	+22.2
Liberal Democrats	Irene Cooper	201	16.8	−6.9
Majority		463	38.8	−8.1
Turnout		1,196		

East Middleton
Party	Candidate	Votes	%	±%
Labour	Anne Murphy	782	47.9	−1.0
Liberal Democrats	Marie Welsby	572	35.1	−5.1
Conservative	Gary Matthews	253	15.5	+6.1
Christian Democratic Party	Christine West	24	1.5	+0.1
Majority		210	12.8	+4.1
Turnout		1,631		

Healey
Party	Candidate	Votes	%	±%
Labour	Surinder Biant	1,101	36.3	+0.2
Liberal Democrats	Thomas Bailey	1,053	34.8	−2.6
Conservative	Andrew Neilson	876	28.9	+2.4
Majority		48	1.5	
Turnout		3,030		

Littleborough
Party	Candidate	Votes	%	±%
Liberal Democrats	Peter Evans	899	43.7	−5.5
Conservative	Peter Lord	703	34.2	+7.2
Labour	David Finlay	455	22.1	−1.7
Majority		196	9.5	−12.7
Turnout		2,057		

Milnrow and Newhey
Party	Candidate	Votes	%	±%
Liberal Democrats	Irene Davidson	1,020	53.2	+4.5
Labour	John Ingham	467	24.3	−2.5
Conservative	Allan Marshall	432	22.5	−2.0
Majority		553	28.9	+7.0
Turnout		1,919		

Newbold
Party	Candidate	Votes	%	±%
Liberal Democrats	Christine Akram	864	50.0	+28.2
Labour	David Felton	599	34.7	−31.1
Conservative	Michael Butler	265	15.3	+2.9
Majority		265	15.3	−28.7
Turnout		1,728		

Norden and Bamford
Party	Candidate	Votes	%	±%
Conservative	Jane Gartside	1,876	67.5	+13.6
Liberal Democrats	Ted Sullivan	905	32.5	+0.6
Majority		971	35.0	+13.0
Turnout		2,781		

North Heywood
Party	Candidate	Votes	%	±%
Labour	Brian Davies	982	66.2	+9.5
Conservative	Rachel McLachlan	502	33.8	+2.6
Majority		480	32.4	+6.9
Turnout		1,484		

North Middleton
Party	Candidate	Votes	%	±%
Labour	Ian Robertson	736	53.2	−7.7
Liberal Democrats	Shaun Haynes	354	25.6	−13.5
Conservative	Paul Spilling	294	21.2	+21.2
Majority		382	27.6	+5.8
Turnout		1,384		

Smallbridge and Wardleworth
Party	Candidate	Votes	%	±%
Liberal Democrats	Shah Wazir	2,189	55.8	+16.6
Labour	Abdul Chowdry	1,732	44.2	+8.5
Majority		457	11.6	+8.1
Turnout		3,921		

South Heywood
Party	Candidate	Votes	%	±%
Labour	Linda Robinson	1,281	62.5	−4.6
Conservative	Gerard Heatherington	769	37.5	+4.6
Majority		512	25.0	−9.2
Turnout		2,050		

South Middleton
Party	Candidate	Votes	%	±%
Labour	Donna Martin	1,386	52.8	+0.4
Conservative	Mary Fitzsimons	1,237	47.2	+11.8
Majority		149	5.6	−11.4
Turnout		2,623		

Spotland
Party	Candidate	Votes	%	±%
Liberal Democrats	Norman Smith	1,535	83.4	+22.8
Labour	Stefan Cholewka	305	16.6	−9.0
Majority		1,230	66.8	+31.8
Turnout		1,840		

Wardle
Party	Candidate	Votes	%	±%
Conservative	Joyce Wright	1,168	61.8	−6.5
Labour	Mike Radanovic	390	20.6	+2.8
Liberal Democrats	Anthony Heaford	333	17.6	+3.8
Majority		778	41.2	
Turnout		1,891		

West Heywood
Party	Candidate	Votes	%	±%
Labour	Alan McCarthy	775	70.1	
Conservative	Neil Brockbank	330	29.9	
Majority		445	40.2	
Turnout		1,105		

West Middleton
Party	Candidate	Votes	%	±%
Labour	John Murtaza	704	67.7	−1.5
Conservative	Denise Matthews	173	16.6	+4.3
Liberal	Philip Burke	163	15.7	+9.1
Majority		531	51.1	−5.8
Turnout		1,040		
