= 2014 Rochdale Metropolitan Borough Council election =

2014 UK local government election

The 2014 Rochdale Metropolitan Borough Council election took place on 22 May 2014 to elect members of Rochdale Metropolitan Borough Council in England. This was on the same day as other local elections.

The Labour Party retained control of the Council

After the election, the composition of the council was:

- Labour 48
- Conservative 11
- Liberal Democrat 1

== Election result ==
Rochdale local election result 2014
Party	Seats	Gains	Losses	Net gain/loss	Seats %	Votes %	Votes	+/−
Labour	16	7	0	+7		45.8	24,433	-7.5
Conservative	3	1	2	-1		20.7	11,039	-5.9
UKIP	0	0	0	0		17.1	9,112	+16.5
Liberal Democrats	0	0	6	-6		10.1	5,382	-5.0
Green	0	0	0	0		2.8	1,476	+2.8
Respect	0	0	0	0		0.2	132	+0.2
Independent	0	0	0	0		3.3	1,773	+2.7

== Ward results ==
=== Balderstone & Kirkholt ward ===
Balderstone & Kirkholt
Party	Candidate	Votes	%	±%
Labour	Kathleen Nickson	1,088	49.4	−16.4
UKIP	Michael Anslow	669	30.4	+30.4
Conservative	Keith Taylor	262	11.9	+4.3
Liberal Democrats	John Swarbrick	183	8.3	−18.5
Majority		419	19.0	−20.3
Turnout		2,202	30.2	−2.8
Labour gain from Liberal Democrats		Swing		

=== Bamford ward ===
Bamford
Party	Candidate	Votes	%	±%
Conservative	Ian Duckworth	1,644	57.9	+16.4
Labour	Dobir Miah	755	26.6	+3.1
Liberal Democrats	Peter Clegg	438	15.4	−19.6
Majority		889	31.3	+24.8
Turnout		2,837	36.8	−2.2
Conservative hold		Swing		

=== Castleton ward ===
Castleton
Party	Candidate	Votes	%	±%
Labour	Aasim Rashid	1,120	43.7	−31.4
Independent	Peter Davison	716	27.9	+27.9
Conservative	Ronald Crossley	459	17.9	+4.3
Liberal Democrats	Anthony Smith	259	10.5	−0.8
Majority		404	15.8	−45.7
Turnout		2,554	32.8	+2.8
Labour gain from Liberal Democrats		Swing		

=== Central Rochdale ward ===
Central Rochdale
Party	Candidate	Votes	%	±%
Labour	Sultan Ali	2,509	79.5	+8.3
Liberal Democrats	Rosemary Jones	228	7.2	−13.1
Independent	Andy Littlewood	224	7.1	+7.1
Conservative	Sajad Ali	193	6.1	−2.4
Majority		2,281	72.3	+22.9
Turnout		3,154	42.0	−0.1
Labour hold		Swing		

=== East Middleton ward ===
East Middleton
Party	Candidate	Votes	%	±%
Labour	June West	1,092	47.1	−25.8
UKIP	Angela Gardner	749	32.3	+32.3
Conservative	Teresa Fitzsimons	365	15.7	−3.2
Liberal Democrats	Irene Cooper	112	4.8	−3.4
Majority		343	14.8	−39.3
Turnout		2,318	29.5	+4.5
Labour hold		Swing		

=== Healey ward ===
Healey
Party	Candidate	Votes	%	±%
Labour	Kieran Heakin	1,027	34.4	−10.9
Conservative	Lee Durrant	877	29.4	−11.7
UKIP	Maureen Kershaw	723	24.2	+24.2
Liberal Democrats	Tom Bailey	214	7.2	−6.4
Green	Mick Coates	146	4.9	+4.9
Majority		150	5.0	+0.9
Turnout		2,987	37.5	+2.5
Labour gain from Liberal Democrats		Swing		

=== Hopwood Hall ward ===
Hopwood Hall
Party	Candidate	Votes	%	±%
Labour	Carol Wardle	1,275	51.9	−7.6
UKIP	Michael Foster	769	31.3	+31.3
Conservative	Christopher Birchenough	315	12.8	−11.3
Liberal Democrats	Tony MacSparran	97	3.9	−2.0
Majority		506	20.6	−14.7
Turnout		2,456	29.3	+4.3
Labour hold		Swing		

=== Kingsway ward ===
Kingsway
Party	Candidate	Votes	%	±%
Labour	Daalat Ali	1,934	66.3	+3.1
Green	Mark Hollinrake	355	12.2	+12.2
Liberal Democrats	David Clayton	324	11.1	−6.3
Conservative	John Kershaw	303	10.4	−1.2
Majority		1,579	78.3	+32.5
Turnout		2,016	34.6	+1.6
Labour hold		Swing		

=== Littleborough Lakeside ward ===
Littleborough Lakeside
Party	Candidate	Votes	%	±%
Labour	Janet Emsley	1,015	36.8	−13.9
Conservative	Stephanie Mills	773	28.0	−21.3
UKIP	Ed Aadahl	763	27.7	+27.7
Green	Glynis Coats	120	4.4	+4.4
Liberal Democrats	Keith Swift	86	3.1	+3.1
Majority		242	8.8	+7.4
Turnout		2,757	35.7	+7.7
Labour gain from Conservative		Swing		

=== Milkstone & Deeplish ward ===
Milkstone & Deeplish
Party	Candidate	Votes	%	±%
Labour	Sameena Zaheer	2,111	67.2	+10.3
Conservative	Rifat Mahmood	438	13.9	−24.0
UKIP	Neville Westerman	192	6.1	+6.1
Independent	Sarah Bibi	137	4.4	+4.4
Respect	Dave Edler	132	4.2	+4.2
Liberal Democrats	Gordon Wharton	130	4.1	−1.1
Majority		1,673	51.6	+32.6
Turnout		3,240	41.1	−0.9
Labour gain from Liberal Democrats		Swing		

=== Milnrow & Newhey ward ===
Milnrow & Newhey
Party	Candidate	Votes	%	±%
Labour	Neil Butterworth	1,116	36.3	−9.0
Liberal Democrats	Andy Kelly	1,103	35.9	−3.6
Conservative	James Conboy	564	18.3	+3.1
Green	Helen Andrews	291	4.8	+4.8
Majority		13	0.4	−5.4
Turnout		3,074	38.9	+4.9
Labour gain from Liberal Democrats		Swing		

=== Norden ward ===
Norden
Party	Candidate	Votes	%	±%
Conservative	Mike Holly	1,117	41.3	−26.3
UKIP	Mervyn Simpson	641	23.7	+23.7
Labour	Anthony Bennett	637	23.6	−1.5
Liberal Democrats	Stephen Anderson	178	6.6	−0.7
Green	Ian Andrews	131	4.8	+4.8
Majority		476	17.6	−24.8
Turnout		2,704	34.8	+3.8
Conservative hold		Swing		

=== North Heywood ward ===
North Heywood
Party	Candidate	Votes	%	±%
Liberal Democrats	Peter Rush	998	38.8	+2.3
Labour	Daniel Meredith	899	35.0	−20.4
UKIP	Phil Humphreys	550	21.4	+21.4
Conservative	Jacqueline Holt	125	4.9	−3.2
Majority		99	3.8	
Turnout		2,572	34.1	+6.1
Liberal Democrats hold		Swing		

=== North Middleton ward ===
North Middleton
Party	Candidate	Votes	%	±%
Labour	Christopher Furlong	851	40.8	−3.6
UKIP	David Kenworthy	779	37.3	+37.3
Conservative	Barbara Braiden	273	13.1	+0.5
Independent	Richard Whitaker	129	6.2	−28.7
Liberal Democrats	John Wilkins	55	2.6	−5.5
Majority		72	3.4	−6.1
Turnout		2,087	26.6	+1.6
Labour hold		Swing		

=== Smallbridge & Firgrove ward ===
Smallbridge & Firgrove
Party	Candidate	Votes	%	±%
Labour	John Blundell	1,717	67.8	+4.0
Conservative	Leonard Branton	471	18.6	−9.1
Liberal Democrats	Eatzaz Asim	355	13.6	+5.1
Majority		1,246	49.2	+13.0
Turnout		2,533	31.4	+2.4
Labour hold		Swing		

=== South Middleton ward ===
South Middleton
Party	Candidate	Votes	%	±%
Labour	Andrew Bell	1,226	41.9	−12.2
UKIP	Sean Page	781	26.7	+26.7
Conservative	Bernard Braiden	677	23.2	−18.1
Green	Abigail Jackson	150	5.1	+5.1
Liberal Democrats	Phil Jayes	89	3.0	−1.7
Majority		445	15.2	+2.4
Turnout		2,923	36.7	+3.7
Labour gain from Conservative		Swing		

=== Spotland & Falinge ward ===
Spotland & Falinge
Party	Candidate	Votes	%	±%
Labour	Surinder Biant	1,316	43.6	+7.8
UKIP	Michael Singleton	635	21.0	+21.0
Independent	Carl Faulkner	567	18.8	−10.0
Conservative	Asif Khan	303	10.0	+0.1
Liberal Democrats	Jack Rawstron	197	6.5	−19.1
Majority		681	22.6	+15.6
Turnout		3,018	37.8	−1.2
Labour hold		Swing		

=== Wardle & West Littleborough ward ===
Wardle & West Littleborough
Party	Candidate	Votes	%	±%
Conservative	Robert Clegg	1,458	60.7	−8.8
Labour	David Finlay	549	22.8	−0.9
Green	Fearn Thomas	283	11.8	+11.8
Liberal Democrats	David Bamford	113	4.7	−2.1
Majority		909	37.8	−7.9
Turnout		2,403	32.1	+1.1
Conservative hold		Swing		

=== West Heywood ward ===
West Heywood
Party	Candidate	Votes	%	±%
Labour	Alan McCarthy	1,029	43.2	−24.0
UKIP	Warren Mitchell	1,006	42.3	+26.9
Conservative	Jane Howard	248	10.4	−0.6
Liberal Democrats	Peter Malcolm	97	4.1	−2.3
Majority		23	1.0	−50.8
Turnout		2,380	27.8	+4.8
Labour hold		Swing		

=== West Middleton ward ===
West Middleton
Party	Candidate	Votes	%	±%
Labour	Neil Emmott	1,167	50.3	−31.9
UKIP	Lee Seville	855	36.8	+36.8
Conservative	Frank Ferrari	174	7.5	−6.2
Liberal Democrats	Frank Cooper	126	5.4	+1.3
Majority		312	13.4	−55.2
Turnout		2,322	26.9	+0
Labour hold		Swing		
