= 2016 Rochdale Metropolitan Borough Council election =

2016 local election in England

2016 local election results in Rochdale

The 2016 Rochdale Metropolitan Borough Council election took place on 5 May 2016 to elect members of Rochdale Metropolitan Borough Council in England. This was on the same day as other local elections.

== Election results ==
| Party | Seats | Total Council Seats |
|---|---|---|
| Labour Party (UK) | 16 | 48 |
| Conservative Party (UK) | 3 | 10 |
| Liberal Democrats (UK) | 1 | 2 |
| UKIP | 0 | 0 |
| Independent (politician) | 0 | 0 |
| Trade Unionist and Socialist Coalition | 0 | 0 |
| Green Party of England and Wales | 0 | 0 |
