= Nordens =

Coordinates: 53.547613°N 2.1522152°W

- Location within Greater Manchester
- OS grid reference: SD 90012 05675
- Metropolitan borough: Oldham
- Metropolitan county: Greater Manchester
- Region: North West
- Country: England
- Sovereign state: United Kingdom
- Post town: OLDHAM
- Postcode district: OL9
- Dialling code: 0161
- Police: Greater Manchester
- Fire: Greater Manchester
- Ambulance: North West
- UK Parliament: Oldham West and Royton

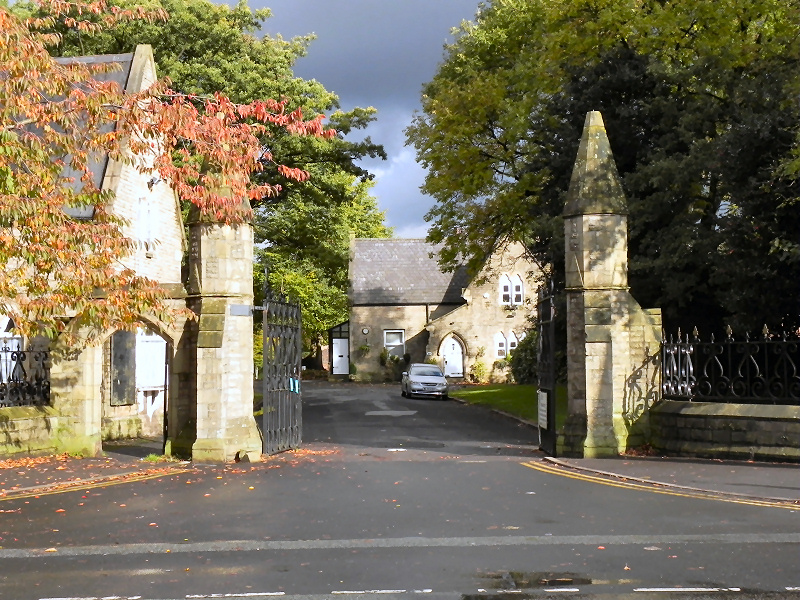
Entrance to Chadderton Cemetery

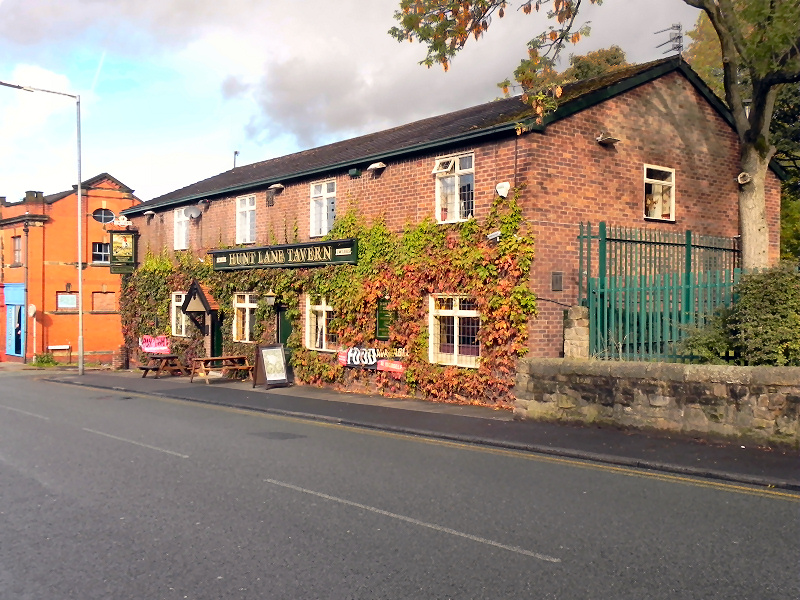
The Hunt Lane Tavern with the former Nordens Branch Co-op to the right

Nordens is a suburban area of Chadderton in the Metropolitan Borough of Oldham, Greater Manchester.

Lying in a valley archaically known as Hunt Clough, Nordens is located around the junction of Middleton Road and Hunt Lane, approximately 0.7 miles west of Chadderton's commercial centre on Middleton Road and is contiguous with the Chadderton Park, Firwood Park, and Stock Brook areas of the town. Semi-rural Foxdenton lies to the south.

The name Nordens derives from North Dene or Valley and is commemorated in the name North Dene Park, a street name in the district.

Nordens Lane (later Nordens Road), a short stretch of which still exists as Nordens Street, was one of Chadderton's oldest roads and was one of the main routes leading to the nearby Chadderton Hall manor house. Suburban housing now occupies the land where the lane once traversed.

Between the mid-1960s and 1992, Nordens Road was the home ground of the now-defunct Oldham Town Football Club (previously known as Oldham Dew), which played in the North West Counties League. The club relocated to the Whitebank Stadium in Oldham.

The Radclyffe School lies in the vicinity of this district.

The Hunt Lane Tavern is a public house in the area, dating back to 1854. The pub has its origins in a farmhouse which was situated in Hunt Clough. This was a valley through which ran the stream known as Spring Brook. The pub, first licensed in 1840, was in the area of Hunt Clough now built over by the Swallow Fields housing development off Middleton Road.

Adjacent to the pub lies the former Nordens Branch of the Co-operative Wholesale Society dating from the early 20th century although the building is now used for other purposes.

The extensive Chadderton Cemetery, which opened in 1857, lies in close vicinity at Spring Brook. The Spring Brook Works, a major finishing factory, also lay at Spring Brook just off Nordens Road. It was built in 1875, being demolished in 1985. Suburban housing now covers this area.

In 1914 a branch of the now-defunct Middleton Junction and Oldham Branch Railway to Chadderton Coal and Mineral Yard opened, necessitating the realignment of Hunt Lane so as to enter Middleton Road further west. Thus, it no longer faced the Hunt Lane Tavern pub. This confuses people to this day with the Hunt Lane Chippy and the Hunt Lane Tavern no longer being adjacent to the lane of that name.

== Transport ==
Bee Network provide the following bus services:

- 59 to Manchester city centre via Middleton and Cheetham Hill and to Oldham
- 396 to Middleton and to Ashton-under-Lyne via Chadderton town centre, Werneth and Bardsley.
