= White Moss =

Coordinates: 53.528626°N 2.1866239°W

- Location within Greater Manchester
- OS grid reference: SD 87726 03568
- Metropolitan borough: Manchester
- Metropolitan county: Greater Manchester
- Region: North West
- Country: England
- Sovereign state: United Kingdom
- Post town: MANCHESTER
- Postcode district: M9
- Dialling code: 0161
- Police: Greater Manchester
- Fire: Greater Manchester
- Ambulance: North West
- UK Parliament: Blackley and Middleton South

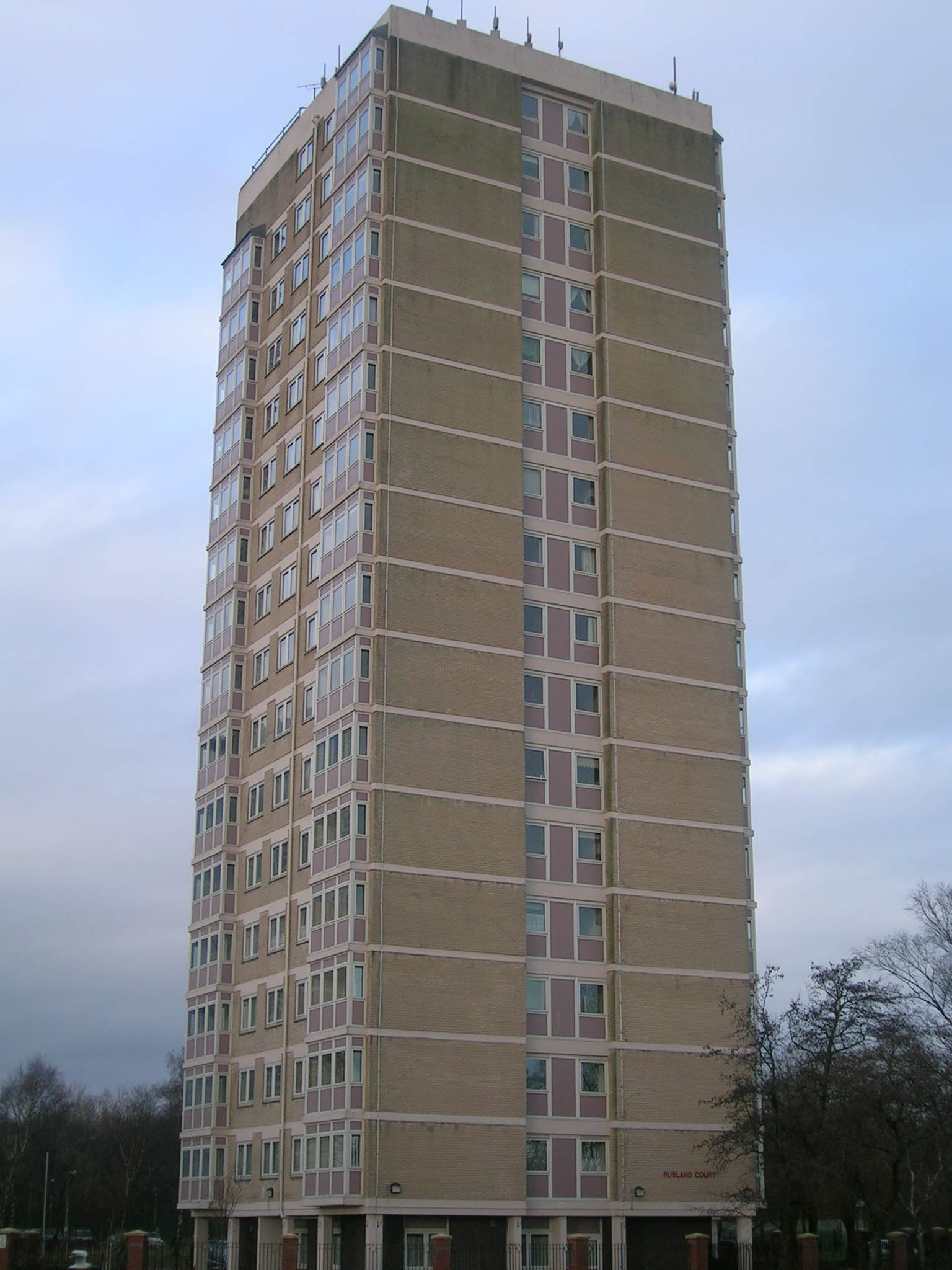
Rusland Court flats, White Moss

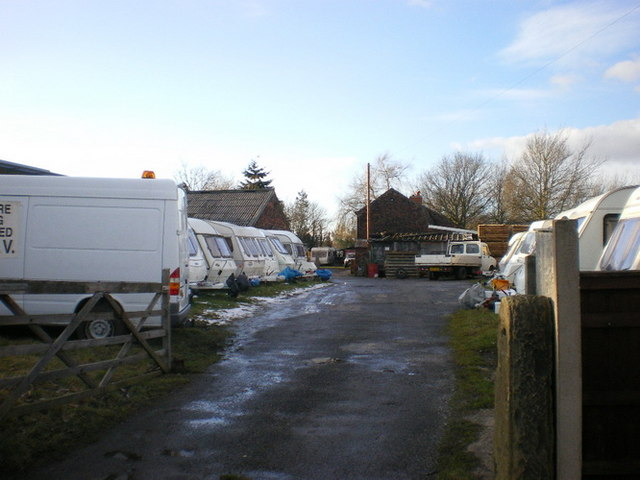
The former White Moss View Farm, now part of the Greengate Industrial Estate

White Moss is an area lying on the common borders of the City of Manchester and the towns of Middleton and Chadderton in Greater Manchester.

White Moss is an extensive area of former wetlands and farms, now bisected by the M60 motorway and the arterial road Victoria Avenue from east to west. The part of White Moss north of the motorway lies partially in both Alkrington in the town of Middleton and the town of Chadderton to the west of Greengate. This part of White Moss is home to Blackley Golf Club.

The area of White Moss lying south of the M60 has become a suburban residential area and forms part of Charlestown ward in the City of Manchester, on the historic border of Moston and Blackley townships. The Manchester Creative and Media Academy and North Manchester Rugby Club lie within this area.
