= Mills Hill =

Coordinates: 53.550788°N 2.1698011°W

- Location within Greater Manchester
- OS grid reference: SD 88847 06031
- Metropolitan borough: Oldham and Rochdale,
- Metropolitan county: Greater Manchester
- Region: North West
- Country: England
- Sovereign state: United Kingdom
- Post town: OLDHAM
- Postcode district: OL1, OL9
- Post town: MANCHESTER
- Postcode district: M24
- Dialling code: 0161
- Police: Greater Manchester
- Fire: Greater Manchester
- Ambulance: North West
- UK Parliament: Oldham West and Royton and Heywood and Middleton North

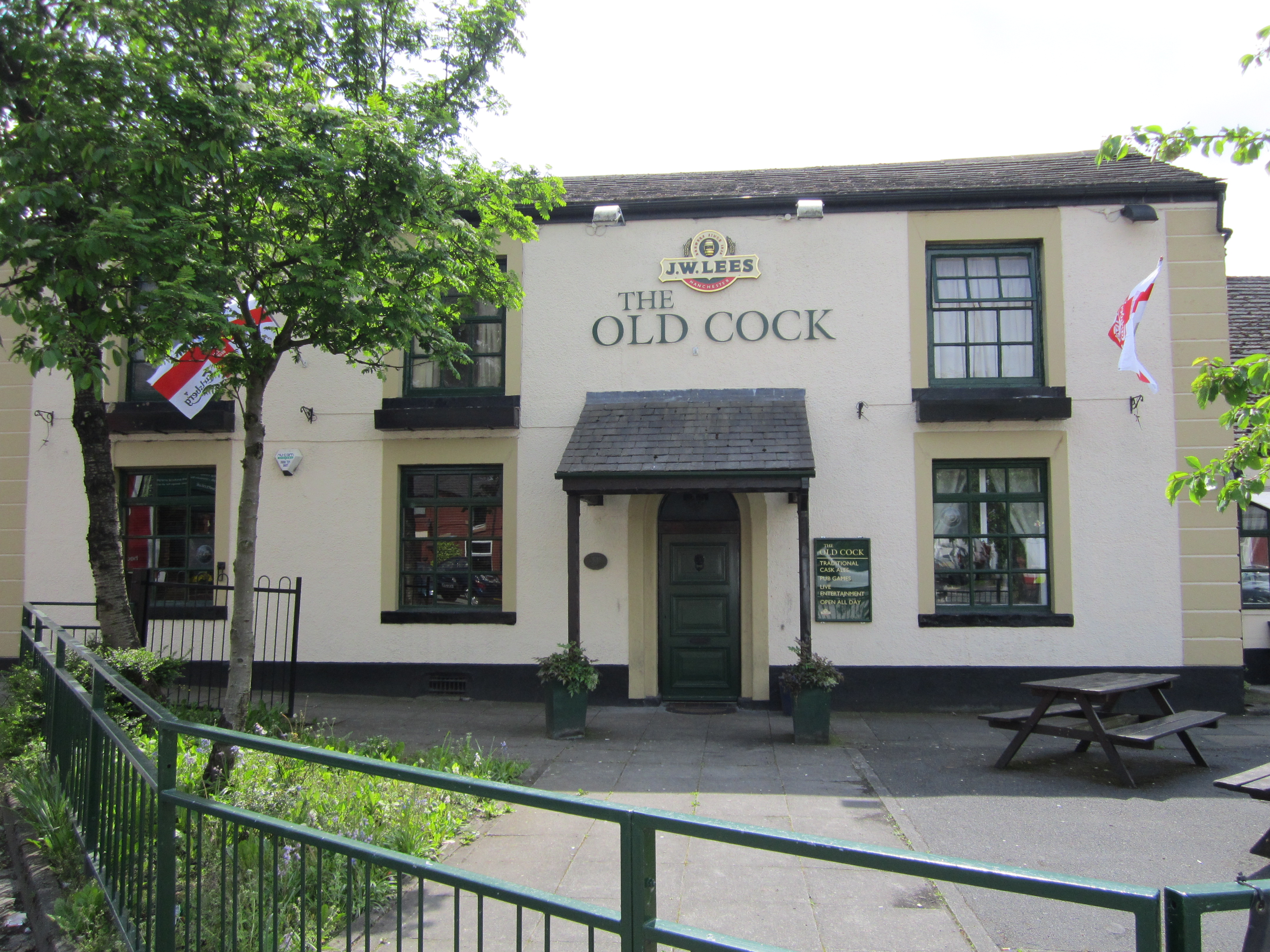
Old Cock Inn, Middleton, close to Mills Hill

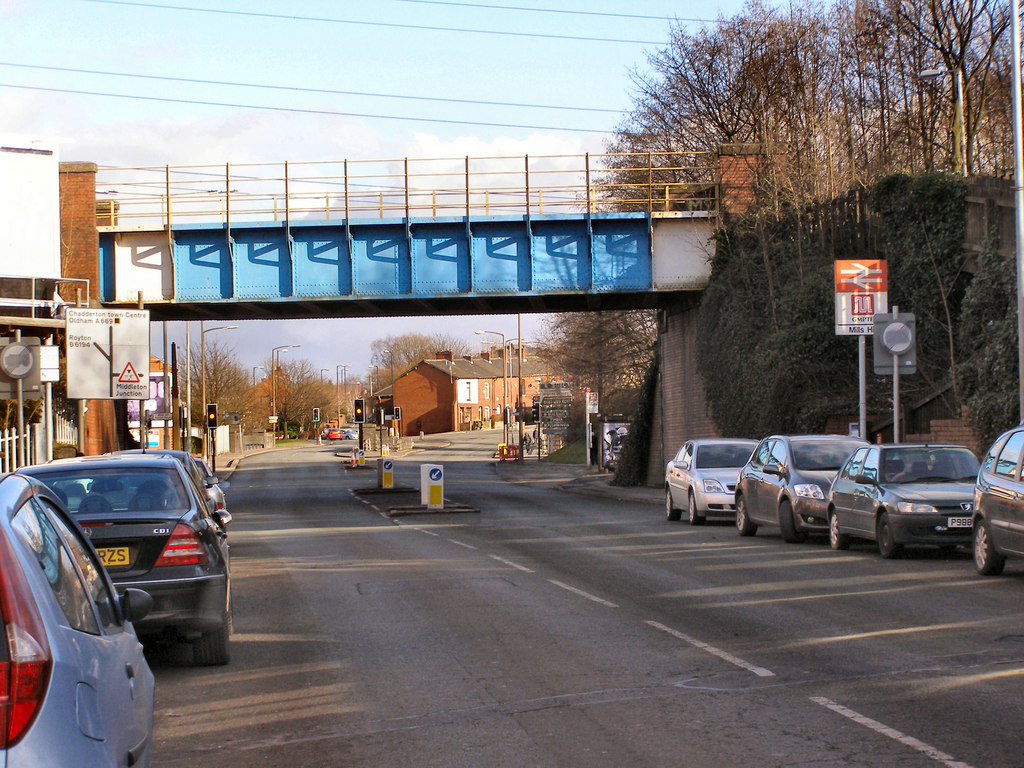
Mills Hill Railway Bridge

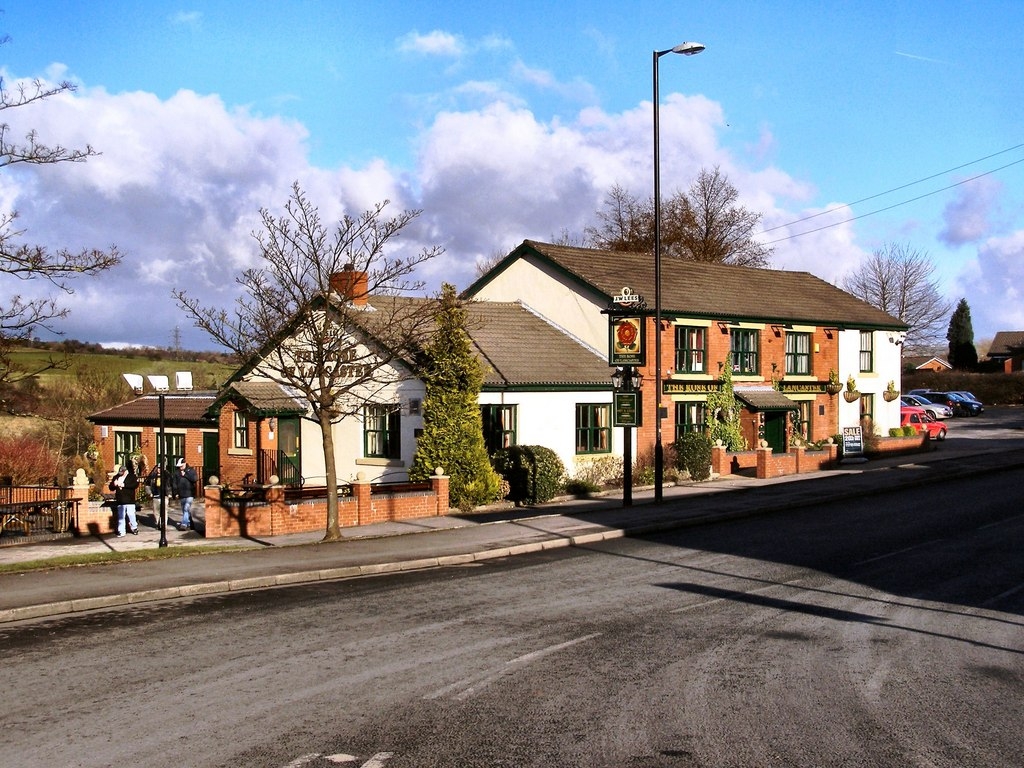
The Rose Of Lancaster, first licensed in 1803

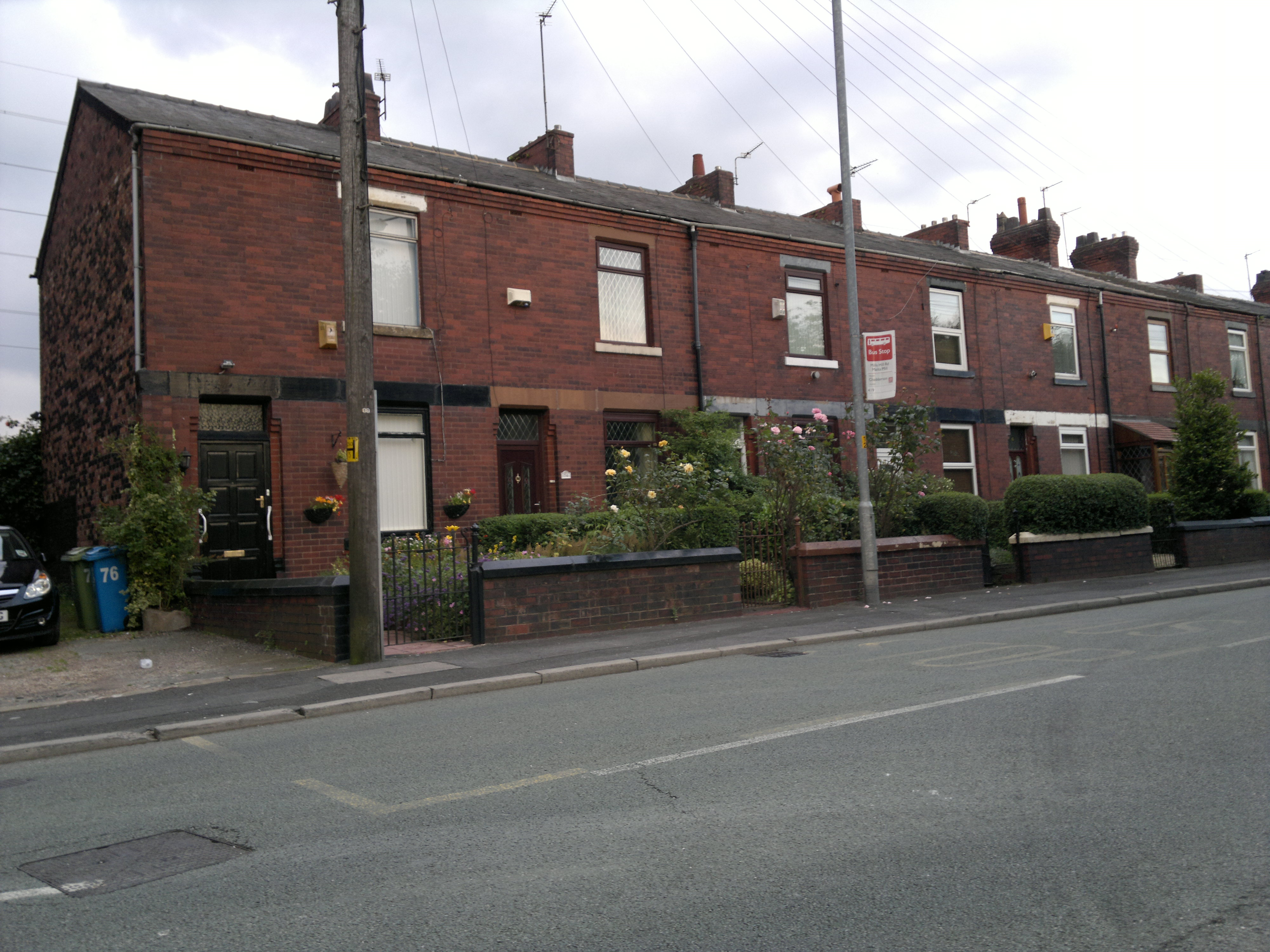
Terraced houses on Mills Hill Road

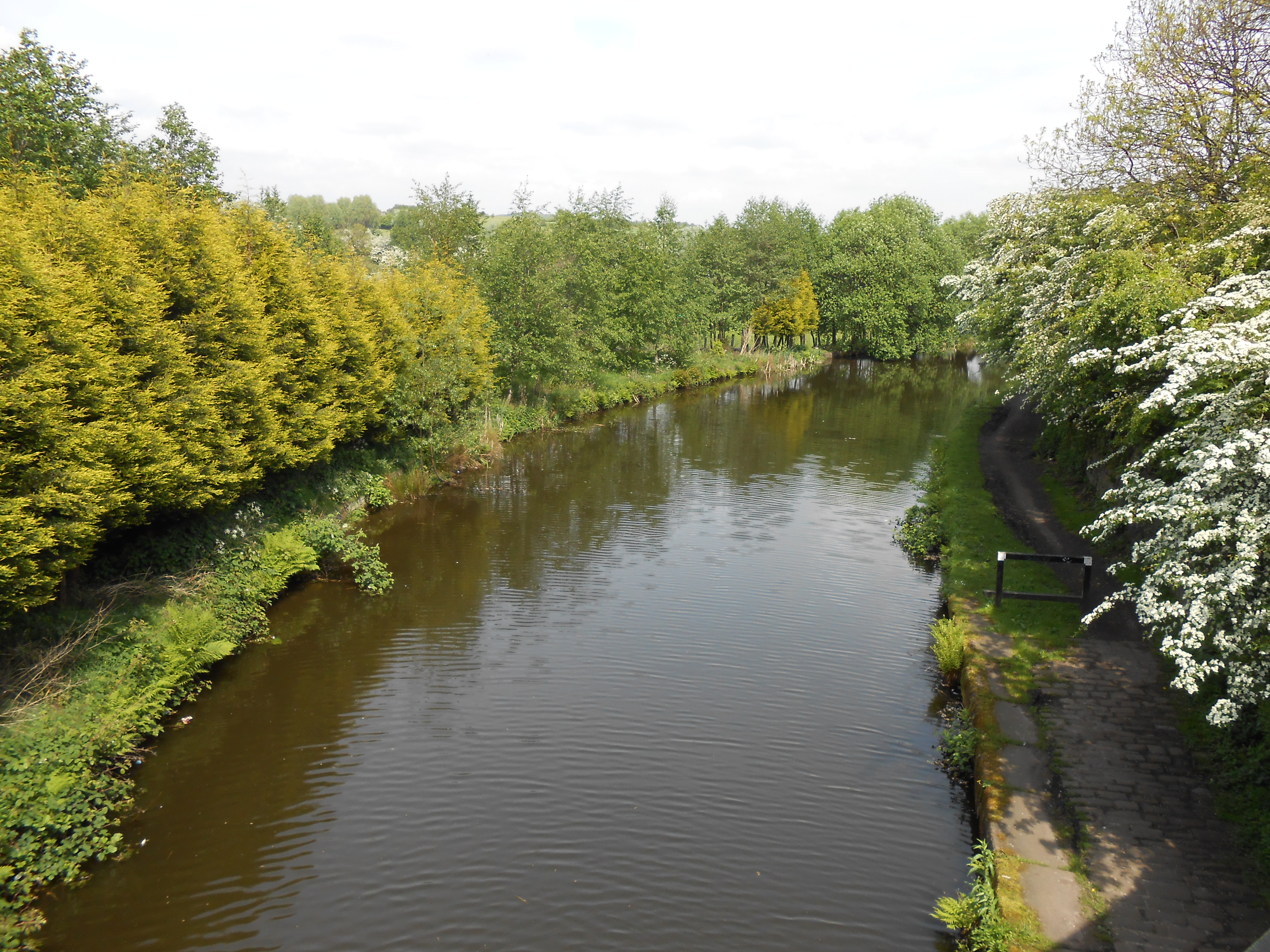
Rochdale Canal at Middleton Road, Mills Hill

Mills Hill is an industrial and residential area that lies on the common border of Middleton and Chadderton in Greater Manchester, England. It lies 1.3 miles east of Middleton town centre and 1.4 miles to the west of central Chadderton. It is contiguous with Middleton Junction, Moorclose, Firwood Park and Chadderton Park. Mills Hill lies along the course of the Rochdale Canal and the River Irk.

== History ==
Until the mid-1800s, the area surrounding Mills Hill was mainly farmland with very few dwellings, now dissected by the Rochdale Canal, which opened in 1804, and the Caldervale Line railway, which opened in 1839. The Middleton to Oldham turnpike road (A669) was constructed and passed through Mills Hill around 1810. The Rose of Lancaster public house on Haigh Lane opened at the new canal during this period. An inn sign was first recorded in 1803.

There had long been a cottage industry of handloom weaving in these parts. The damp climate due to the proximity of the Pennine hills is ideal for spinning and weaving as it gives strength and stability to the thread.

There was a fulling mill called Walk Mill by the canal – fulling was a finishing process for the woollen cloth. Silk weaving flourished in the area too. Walk Mill was also the site of one of the areas oldest public houses, the Duke of Bridgewater, first licensed in 1842. The pub closed on 5 April 1956.

The Rochdale Canal in this area features three structures given a grade II listed building status. The Scowcroft Lane bridge was listed in 1987 and dates to the period the canal was constructed, as does the nearby stone built Coneygreen Lock. A short distance along the canal is a disused skew bridge consisting of cast iron beams with wrought iron beams added later. It is known locally as the 'Iron Donger' and dates from 1863. See Listed buildings in Chadderton.

The current railway bridge at Mills Hill dates from 1934, replacing an older bridge dating to 1839. The new bridge allowed for double deck trams and buses to operate from Middleton to Chadderton for the first time.

== Middleton flood ==
On 11 July 1927 major flooding took place in Middleton when the Rochdale Canal burst its banks at an aqueduct in the Mills Hill area following a period of heavy rainfall, sending millions of gallons of water crashing down into the River Irk below. This resulted in three fatalities and widespread damage downstream in Middleton.

History repeated itself on St George's day in 2005 when a bank breached, near Lock 64, sending thousands of gallons of water surging down into the River Irk. The breach caused severe damage including a 60–80-foot-wide crater around the canal bed. The burst happened on the side of the canal facing away from town, so Middleton was saved from widespread flooding.

== Governance ==
Mills Hill lies on the common border of Middleton and Chadderton and because of this lies on the outskirts of both towns. The area is historically divided at local authority level. There are no strong allegiances to either town and this gave rise, particularly in the days before public road transport, to a strong sense of community independence.

Until 1894, the western part of Mills Hill lay in the historic township of Tonge, after which the township was abolished and incorporated into the Municipal Borough of Middleton. Since 1974, Middleton has formed a part of the Metropolitan Borough of Rochdale.

The rest of Mills Hill lay within Chadderton Urban District until its abolition in 1974. Chadderton now forms a part of the Metropolitan Borough of Oldham.

In 1933, there were exchanges of land in the Mills Hill area between the Chadderton Urban District and the Municipal Borough of Middleton. To the north of Mills Hill, 78 acres to the west of the railway, and north of the River Irk, including Scowcroft Farm, was transferred into Middleton. A smaller area consisting of 9 acres between Mills Hill Road and the Rochdale Canal was transferred to Chadderton.

== Religion and education ==
Mills Hill Baptist Church and Sunday School was founded in 1845, the current church building being on Mills Hill Road. The church initially used a room formerly a barn behind Mills Hill House for worship and Sunday school work. A new building was erected on land next to Mills Hill House in 1849.

Chadderton School Board took over the running of the school in 1894, leasing the building from the trustees of the church, and a new school building was opened in 1902. The Infant Department was separated from the Mixed Department in June 1905, and the Infants and Mixed Departments were amalgamated on 1 December 1922.

The Day School was closed in 1939 and the children transferred to Mills Hills Primary school on Baytree Avenue. The school still serves the area.

== Cotton ==
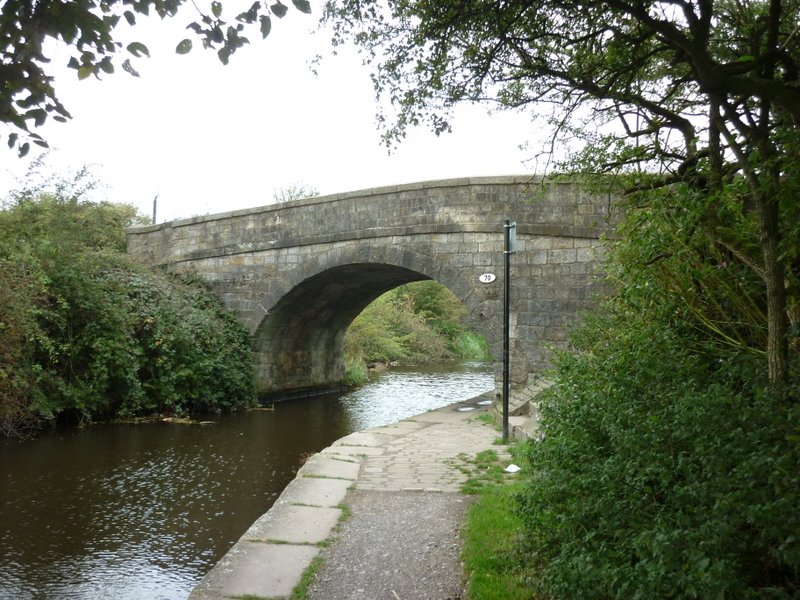
Scowcroft Lane Bridge

The cotton boom in the mid-19th century saw a substantial mill district grow in the area of Mills Hill Road and the Rochdale Canal. The Boundary Mill, built in 1860, stood at right angles to the road where the Waterford Dairy (ex Co-op) now stands (it was demolished in the early 1930s). Next to the Boundary Mill site is the Malta Mill built in 1905, which ceased production in 1963 and now stands empty.

The Laurel Mill further down, was built in 1905, and ceased production two years after Courtaulds bought it in 1964. During the war it was annexed by A. V. Roe for aircraft parts manufacture. The Baytree Mill, next to it, was a fine spinning mill until 1959. These two mills with their massive floor areas were used for other trades, storage and distribution until quite recently.

== Transport ==
Bee Network provide the following bus services:

- 59 to Manchester city centre via Middleton and Cheetham Hill and to Oldham, via Chadderton.
- 396 to Middleton and to Ashton-under-Lyne via Chadderton, Werneth and Bardsley.

Mills Hill railway station offers train services to Manchester and beyond.
