= Middleton Junction =

Coordinates: 53.540°N 2.1708°W

- Location within Greater Manchester
- OS grid reference: SD 88768 04870
- Metropolitan borough: Rochdale and Oldham
- Metropolitan county: Greater Manchester
- Region: North West
- Country: England
- Sovereign state: United Kingdom
- Post town: MANCHESTER
- Postcode district: M24
- Dialling code: 0161
- Police: Greater Manchester
- Fire: Greater Manchester
- Ambulance: North West
- UK Parliament: Heywood and Middleton and Oldham West and Royton

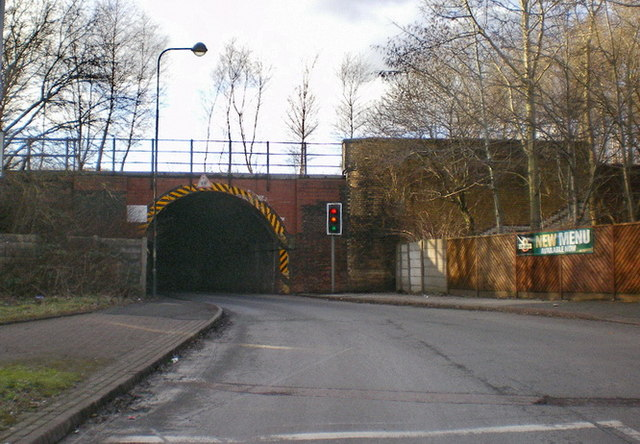
Railway bridge at Grimshaw Lane, site of the former Middleton Junction Railway Station

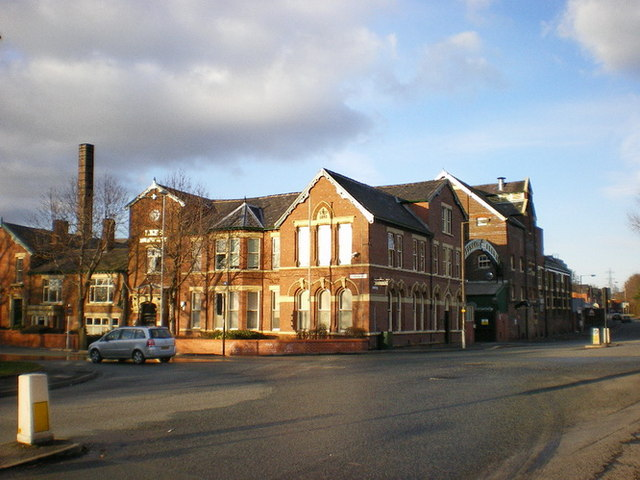
JW Lees Brewery, founded 1812

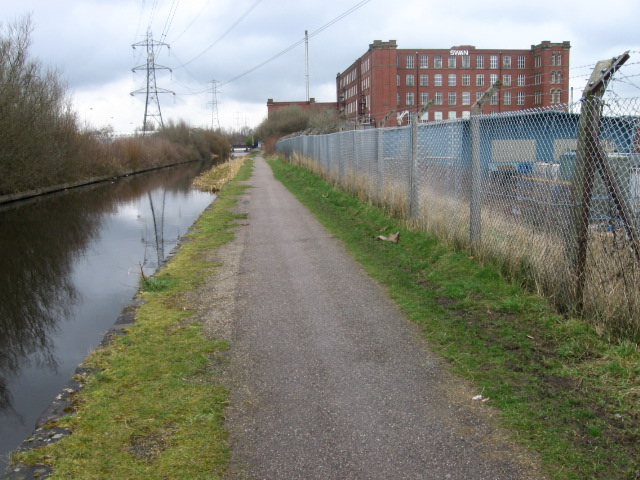
Swan Mill and Rochdale Canal at Middleton Junction

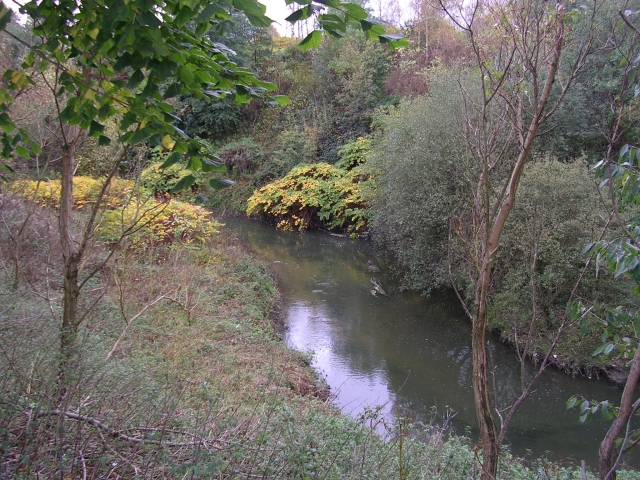
The Wince Brook at Middleton Junction

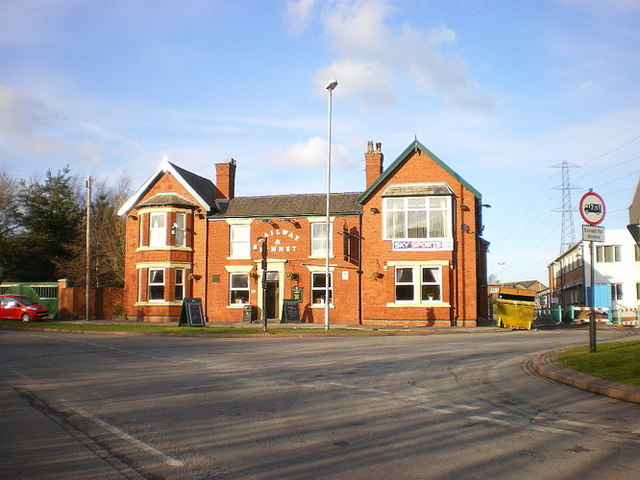
Railway And Linnet public house, Grimshaw Lane

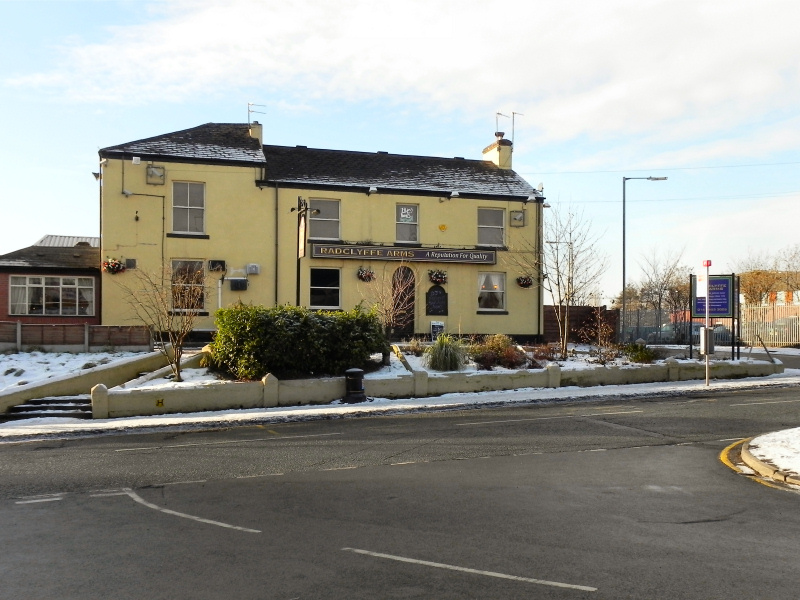
Radclyffe Arms

Middleton Junction is an industrial and residential district lying on the common border of Middleton in the Metropolitan Borough of Rochdale and Chadderton in the Metropolitan Borough of Oldham, Greater Manchester.

The area takes its name from the former Middleton Junction railway station and lies along the course of the Rochdale Canal. It is located 1.4 miles south east of Middleton town centre and 1.9 miles west of central Chadderton.

It is contiguous with other areas of Chadderton and Middleton including Moorclose, Mills Hill, Greengate, Alkrington and Firwood Park. Semi rural Foxdenton lies to the east.

== History ==
The area now known as Middleton Junction originally comprised a number of hamlets situated along Grimshaw Lane and Foxdenton Lane on the border of Chadderton and Tonge townships – Lane End and Hillock (described in the early 1800s as "a pleasant hamlet") in Chadderton, Bradshaw Fold and Jumbo in Tonge (Tonge was a former township which was incorporated into Middleton in the late 19th century).

The area around Jumbo was historically part of the estate of the medieval Bradshaw Hall which was demolished in 1910.

In the 16th century, the area consisted largely of undeveloped forest and meadow. The Hall was located on the south side of a valley overlooking the Wince Brook. The estate had a corn mill on the river and began to rent land to farmers.

In 1777, the silk weaving business was introduced to the area and for the next 50 years there was great demand for hand loom weavers' cottages. The estate rented out land north of the current Grimshaw Lane and the settlements of Jumbo and Bradshaw Fold rapidly grew. The estate was bounded on the south by Wince Brook, the west by Tonge and in the north by Chadderton. The only access to the estate road would have been the lane to Foxdenton Hall, later to become Grimshaw Lane.

Two settlements were formed firstly by the home weavers and later by the mill owners. Bradshaw Fold was the area on the north east of the estate, later to be replaced by the station name, Middleton Junction. In the 1861 census, Bradshaw Fold had over 70 weavers' cottages.

On the west, between the current Aspinall Street and Sandy Lane, was the village of Jumbo or Jumba.

In an 1823 slang dictionary, a jumbo is defined as a clumsy or unwieldy fellow. The origin of this expression is based on a well read travel book, Travels in Africa. It describes a tribal custom in Africa where a witch doctor would dress up and perform a noisy dancing ritual. He was known as Mumbo Jumbo. A letter to the Manchester Guardian in 1862 speculates as to the origins of the name.

“….The cottages in the vicinity of Bradshaw Hall are occupied by silk weavers, farm labourers and cotton spinners and commonly known by the singular name “Jumba” which significant title is supposed to be conferred there-on from the jumping gambols and athletic exercises of the residents on Saint Mondays and other holidays.”

In 1779, Thomas Chadderton sold the coal rights to the estate which were probably accessed from the Alkrington pit at Lancashire Fold. The Rochdale canal was built shortly after this (1804), greatly easing the transportation of both coal and cotton.

JW Lees brewery opened at Bradshaw Fold in 1828.

Middleton Junction railway station opened at Lane End on 31 March 1842 with a branch line to Oldham Werneth railway station. The railway line split the hamlet of Lane End in two. The station was originally called Oldham Junction but by August 1842 it was known as Middleton Station, changing its name to Middleton Junction some ten years later. The branch line to Middleton opened in 1857. The station closed in the mid-1960s.

The late 19th century gave rise to a substantial cotton spinning district around the area of the station and along the canal and saw terraced houses built along Grimshaw Lane and its environs. Mills included the Junction Mill, Laurel Mill among others. See List of mills in Chadderton

The name Middleton Junction was adopted as place-name for the area during this period.

== Bradshaw Hall and Estate ==
The estate was a key part of the post-medieval manorial system of North Manchester. It was occupied by descendants of the ancient Chadderton family from 1548 to 1820 and comprised a large part of the current Middleton Junction and Jumbo area.

The remains of the Hall lie beneath private land off Glenn Grove. Although demolished in 1910, it is of significant archaeological interest as the footprint of the hall has not been built upon and the site may contain evidence of earlier occupation.

History of the estate: The first recorded evidence to the Bradshaw area is a 1320 survey of the Barony of Manchester which records a ‘Bruyd-shaw' (Broad Wood) in the vicinity of ‘Alcryn-ton', ‘White Moss', ‘Black-ley' and ‘Nut-Hurst'. An 1839 map confirms the area as Broad Wood whilst later Ordnance Survey maps show both Bradshaw Hall and Bradshaw Fold in the same area.

There is a record of the ownership of the land in the will of Robert Chadderton a “Yeoman of Bradshaw Hall” in 1639. It refers to previous owners of the land as; – The Priory of St John of Jerusalem, Roger de Montbegon (d 1266) and the Earls of Derby.

Due to the close location to Chadderton Hall, it is likely that Bradshaw was originally part of the Manor of Chadderton which was passed to Gilbert de Notton in 1212 and to Richard de Trafford in 1232.

Richard's second son Geoffrey inherited the land and took the name Geoffrey de Chadderton and built Chadderton Hall in the mid 13th Century. The Chadderton manor was passed to the Radcliffe family by 1367 and subsequently to the Assheton family in 1454.

The Radcliffes were later to settle in Foxdenton, and the Chadderton family went on to establish both Nuthurst (Moston) and Bradshaw Halls.

The Chadderton family can be identified as having a presence in the area of Bradshaw as far back as Edward VI (1547) when Edmund Chadderton was a plaintiff in a civil court action against John Tonge and others for trespass on the common turbary of Tonge Moor. The eastern side of the Tonge manor is bounded by the Irk River and Wince Brook so Tonge Moor must have been the area between Tonge Hall and Bradshaw Hall.

Edmund had also begun a property dispute some years earlier in the reign of Henry VIII (1532). This concerned an area south of the Bradshaw Hall site and related to an area known as Theymore Waste (or Theale Moor). The dispute involved the borders of the Nuthurst Waste, Chadderton Waste, Oldham Waste, Moston Hamlet and Ashton Township. The dispute continued for over 70 years with Theymore borders being redefined and a common area left known as the ‘Equals'.(See also 'A Boundary Dispute').

Edmund Chadderton held the smaller of two Halls at Nuthurst which was 2 miles south of Bradshaw Hall. His eldest son was William Chadderton (1540–1608) who became the Bishop of Lincoln and Chester.

We find the first reference to Bradshaw Hall in the will of Robert Chadderton in 1639. The ancestry of Robert is unclear but we can assume he is related to the Nuthurst hall branch and Edmund Chadderton's line because of the closeness of the two estates. Roberts's first son was named Edmund and this provides further support to this assumption.

Although this is the first documentary evidence of the occupation of the site, the Chadderton family could have been here as early as 1367 following the transfer of Chadderton Hall to the Radcliffe's.

== Lowbands Farm, Jumbo ==
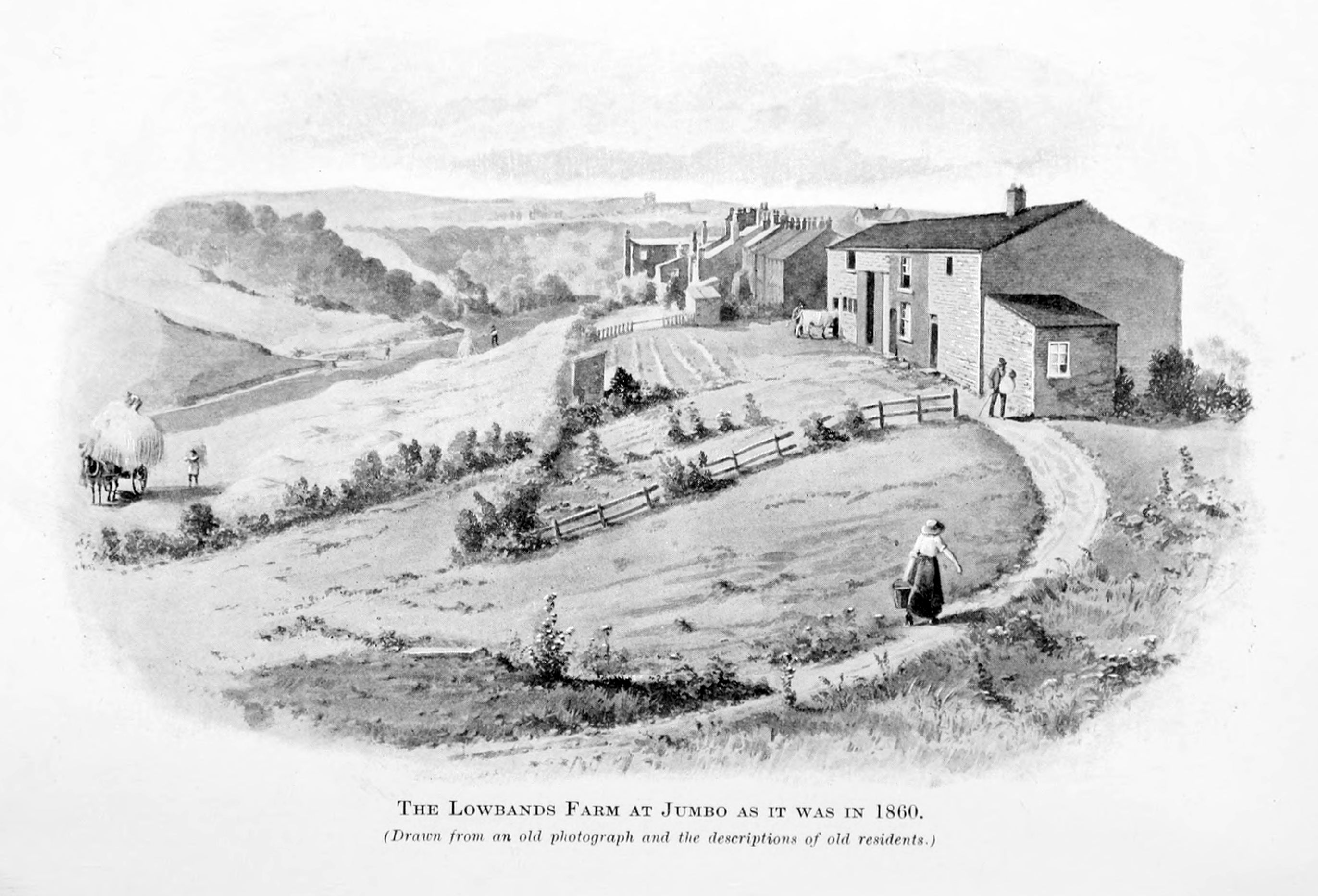
Illustration of the Lowbands Farm, as it would have looked in 1860.

In 1860, an influential meeting here helped lay the foundations for the development of the Co-operative Wholesale Society. Lowbands Farm was a convenient meeting place for the co-operators from Rochdale, Oldham and Manchester. Six miles south from Rochdale, four west from Oldham and five north from Manchester, the farm was a useful stopping-off point for a country walk.

Jumbo is now part of Middleton, lying between Middleton and Middleton Junction. In 1860 it was a hamlet made up of a few farms and the cottages of handloom silk weavers, though the rural characteristics were beginning to disappear after the building of a railway through the area.

In 1851 a few cottage workers, manufacturers of velvet waistcoats, decided to get back to the land. They pooled their resources to rent six acres with a house at Jumbo. Previously called "Walmsley's", the farm was nicknamed "Lowbands" after a Feargus O'Connor land scheme estate in Worcestershire.

The farm made a loss. George Booth was put in charge to try and remedy matters. A Jumbo Co-operative Society was formed to lend a hand and the farm's loomhouse was converted into the new society's store room. Debts and high interest rates took their toll. The farm implements and other assets were sold in 1861, debts paid off, and the stock of the little store turned over to the Middleton Society for £13. 5s.

== Religion ==
St Gabriel, Middleton Junction is an Anglo-Catholic Church founded in 1885.

Jumbo Methodist Church was located on Grimshaw Lane. It was founded in 1868 and closed in 1967.

Grimshaw Lane, Wesleyan Methodist, was founded in 1874 and closed in 1966. In its early years the church was known as Lane End Church

== Middleton Junction County Primary School (1873–1968) ==
Meetings of Methodists in the area began in 1800, and in 1820 Lane End or Hillock Sunday School was built at the junction of Foxdenton and Grimshaw Lanes. With the development of Middleton Junction following the arrival of the railway a new school became necessary which was opened in 1874 as Middleton Junction Wesleyan School. The school was taken over by Chadderton School Board in 1894.

== Transport ==
Bee Network provides the following bus services in Middleton Junction -

112/113 - to Middleton and to Manchester City Centre via Moston and Collyhurst.

415 to Middleton via Alkrington and to Oldham via Nimble Nook and Cowhill.
