= Baretrees, Greater Manchester =

Coordinates: 53.549637°N 2.139766°W

Baretrees
- Location within Greater Manchester
- OS grid reference: SD908058
- Metropolitan borough: Oldham
- Metropolitan county: Greater Manchester
- Region: North West
- Country: England
- Sovereign state: United Kingdom
- Post town: OLDHAM
- Postcode district: OL9
- Dialling code: 0161
- Police: Greater Manchester
- Fire: Greater Manchester
- Ambulance: North West
- UK Parliament: Oldham West and Royton

Baretrees (or Bare Trees) is a residential area of Chadderton in the Metropolitan Borough of Oldham, in Greater Manchester, England. It takes its name from a former hamlet in the north east of the town in what is now the Laburnum Avenue area.

A local primary school, Bare Trees, bears the locality's name on nearby Holly Grove.

Bare Trees also has an active residents association.

One of the fifteen fatalities of the Peterloo Massacre, Thomas Buckley, was from the hamlet of Bare Trees. Buckley, a gardener aged 62, was described by his neighbours as a 'person fanciful to the fruit garden, a staunch patriot, an enemy to oppression'. Buckley was bayoneted and slashed by a sabre.

== Transport ==
Baretreees is served by bus service 159 operated by Manchester Community Transport, providing links to Oldham town centre via Boundary Park and to Middleton via Chadderton town centre, Woodhouses, Failsworth and New Moston.
