= Greengate, Greater Manchester =

Coordinates: 53.532809°N 2.1749522°W

Greengate
- Location within Greater Manchester
- Metropolitan borough: Oldham
- Metropolitan county: Greater Manchester
- Region: North West
- Country: England
- Sovereign state: United Kingdom
- Post town: MANCHESTER
- Postcode district: M24
- Dialling code: 0161
- Police: Greater Manchester
- Fire: Greater Manchester
- Ambulance: North West
- UK Parliament: Oldham West and Royton

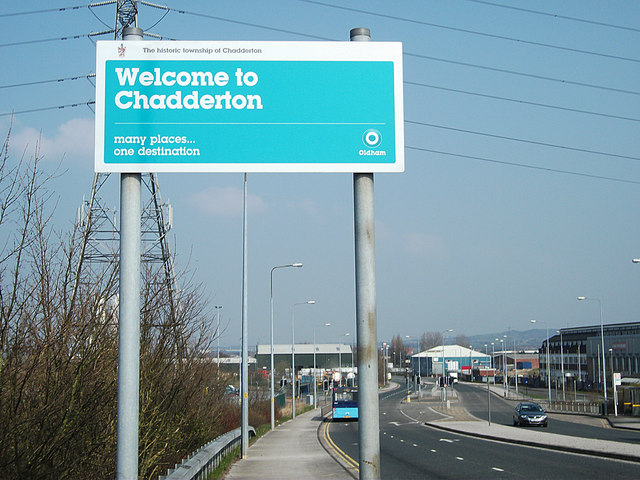
Greengate, looking north from the Chadderton boundary

Greengate is an industrial district in the town of Chadderton in the Metropolitan Borough of Oldham, Greater Manchester.

It is located in the south west of Chadderton, close to the town's common borders with Middleton to the west and Moston in the City of Manchester which lies to the south.

For postal purposes Greengate lies within the Manchester postal district (M24, Middleton).

British aircraft manufacturer Avro, later BAE Chadderton, built a factory at Greengate in 1938–39. It was one of the largest employers in the area. The BAE factory was closed in 2012 and purchased later that year by NOV (formerly National Oilwell Varco), an American multinational working in oil and gas.

== Transport ==
Bee Network provides the following bus services along Greengate -

112/113 - to Middleton via Middleton Junction and to Manchester City Centre via Moston and Collyhurst.

114 - to Middleton via Alkrington and Manchester City Centre via Moston and Collyhurst.

159 to Middleton via Middleton Junction and Tonge and to Oldham via New Moston, Failsworth and Chadderton.

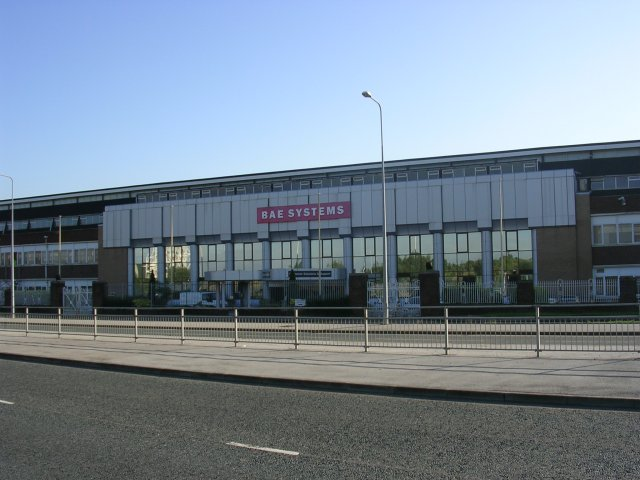
BAE Systems Chadderton Factory at Greengate
