= Tonge, Middleton =

Coordinates: 53.548824°N 2.1862377°W

Tonge
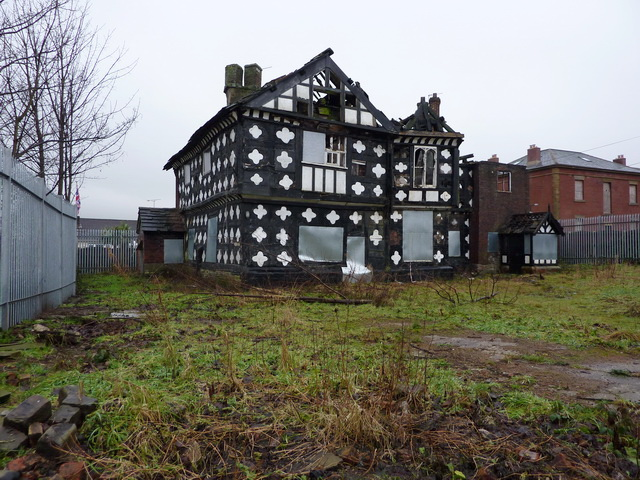
- Tonge Hall

- Location within Greater Manchester
- OS grid reference: SD 87758 05815
- Metropolitan borough: Rochdale
- Metropolitan county: Greater Manchester
- Region: North West
- Country: England
- Sovereign state: United Kingdom
- Post town: MANCHESTER
- Postcode district: M24
- Dialling code: 0161
- Police: Greater Manchester
- Fire: Greater Manchester
- Ambulance: North West
- UK Parliament: Heywood and Middleton

Tonge is a residential and industrial area of Middleton, in the Metropolitan Borough of Rochdale, Greater Manchester. It lies on the east side of Middleton between the town centre and its border with Chadderton in the Metropolitan Borough of Oldham.

Tonge was formerly a township in its own right, until the area was incorporated into the Municipal Borough of Middleton as part of local government reforms in the late 19th century. Its area includes localities such as Moorclose and part of the districts of Mills Hill and Middleton Junction.

Tonge Hall was the manor house for the township. The place-name of Tonge, although no longer widely used in the area, stills survives in the district in the names of several streets and a long standing sports club, Tonge Social & Bowling club, established in 1923.

Mills Hill railway station is located in this district.

Middleton Technology School lies within this district.

== History ==
This township occupied, as its name implies, a tongue of land between the River Irk on the north and its affluent, the Wince Brook, on the south. The area is 392 acres. The surface is mostly above the 300 ft.level—360 ft. is reached at Mills Hill.

Tonge was formerly a township and chapelry in the parish of Prestwich, in 1866 Tonge became a separate civil parish, in 1886 it became part of the Municipal Borough of Middleton, on 31 December 1894 the parish was abolished and merged with Middleton. In 1891 the parish had a population of 8099.

Tonge Church (St Michael's) was founded in 1839.

The Lancashire and Yorkshire Railway Company's line from Manchester to Rochdale passes through the eastern side - (See Caldervale Line). A branch to Middleton opened in 1857, the line closing in the mid 1960s. From this the part of Tonge called Middleton Junction takes its name, though the junction itself is in Chadderton.

The former Middleton Railway Station was in Tonge.

== Landmarks ==
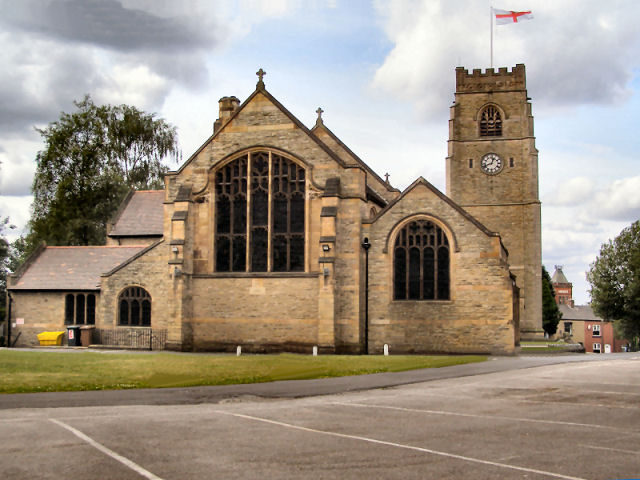
St Michael's, aka Tonge Church

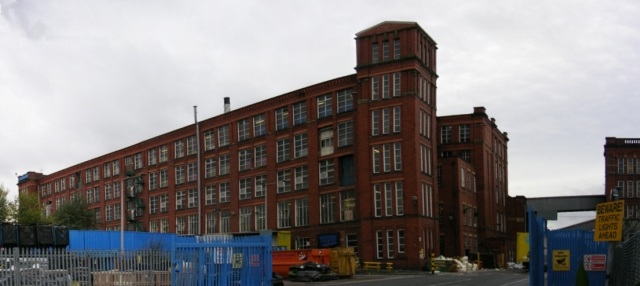
British Vita factory, Oldham Road

St Michael's Church, Middleton has been a church at Townley Street since 1839. It was built to serve a new population created by the Industrial Revolution. During the 19th century changes occurred, including the coming of the railways and the growth of work in the area. The local community grew in numbers. By the end of the century it became clear that the church building was too small. The church was pulled down and a bigger building erected – its foundation stone was laid in 1901.

In 1926, a daughter church was built on Kenyon Lane and called Holy Innocents’ Church. This was to serve the people of Tonge and remained open until 1978, when its congregation joined with those at St Michael’s.

There have been a number of changes to the existing building since the beginning of the 20th century – the nave was built in 1912, the tower was added in 1926 and the Holy Innocents’ Chapel and Memorial area were completed in 1981.

== Sports ==
Tonge AFC were an Association football club formed in 1887 and has it origins at St Michael's School. They originally played on a field behind the Old Cock Inn, Oldham Road but by 1890 the club had moved to a ground near Tonge Hall. The pitch was set in a natural bowl which was partially terraced to accommodate spectators.

The club joined the Manchester Football League in 1896 and were an immediate success, winning the League championship in four of their first five league campaigns, finishing in second place to Newton Heath Athletic in their third season. The club also won five League Cups. The team could not sustain this level of success however, and in 1911 resigned from the league after finishing in bottom place.

The club continued at a lower level until finally disbanding in 1918. A housing development, Tonge Meadow, now occupies the site of the football ground.
