= Healds Green =

Coordinates: 53.560585°N 2.1570880°W

- Location within Greater Manchester
- OS grid reference: SD 89692 07119
- Metropolitan borough: Oldham
- Metropolitan county: Greater Manchester
- Region: North West
- Country: England
- Sovereign state: United Kingdom
- Post town: OLDHAM
- Postcode district: OL1
- Dialling code: 0161
- Police: Greater Manchester
- Fire: Greater Manchester
- Ambulance: North West
- UK Parliament: Oldham West and Royton

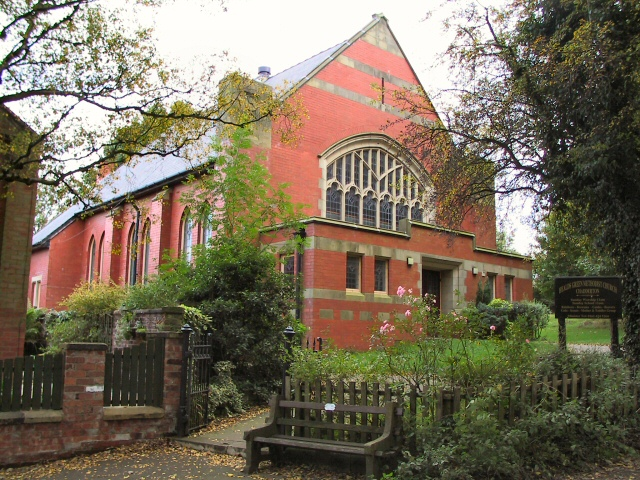
Healds Green Methodist Church

Healds Green is a hamlet in the Metropolitan Borough of Oldham, Greater Manchester, England.

It is in Chadderton's semi rural northern area, just to the north of Chadderton Fold, the ancient focal point of the township.

Most of the area around Healds Green is greenbelt.

== History ==
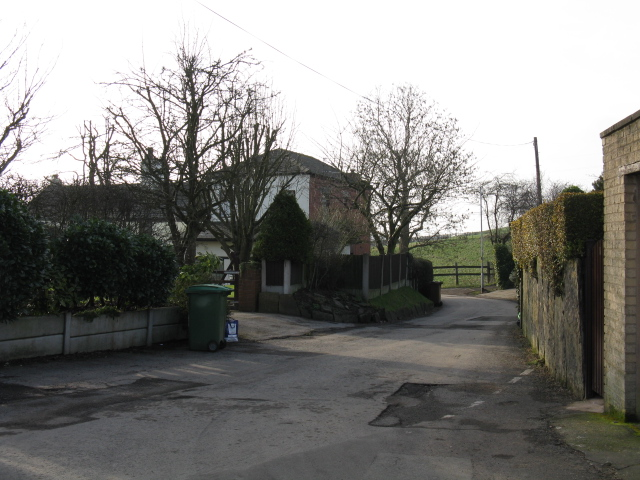
Cottages at Healds Green

A hamlet of forty-one houses and cottages, Healds Green boasts what is believed to be one of Chadderton's oldest surviving buildings. Dating from 1789 and known as The Institute, it was built as a chapel for Methodists and as a hall for everyone. The Institute is now a place where social functions are sometimes held. The building was also used as a grammar school.

In 1811 Healds Green was the meeting place for Chadderton's main contingent of townsfolk who marched to Manchester for the ill-fated political demonstration that came to be known as the Peterloo Massacre.

Healds Green Methodist Church was founded in 1865. The church held its last service in September 2016 and has now closed due to dwindling congregations. In September 2019 the local authority approved plans to convert the church into a five-bedroom luxury home, the works to be completed within a timescale of three years.
