= Foxdenton =

Coordinates: 53.539147°N 2.1596081°W

- Location within Greater Manchester
- OS grid reference: SD 89520 04734
- Metropolitan borough: Oldham
- Metropolitan county: Greater Manchester
- Region: North West
- Country: England
- Sovereign state: United Kingdom
- Post town: MANCHESTER
- Postcode district: M24
- Dialling code: 0161
- Police: Greater Manchester
- Fire: Greater Manchester
- Ambulance: North West
- UK Parliament: Oldham West and Royton

Foxdenton is a semi rural locality in Chadderton in the Metropolitan Borough of Oldham, Greater Manchester. It is located in the west of Chadderton. Middleton Junction lies to the west with Nimble Nook to the east.

It is the location of the manorial Foxdenton Hall and its grounds, Foxdenton Park.

There were several working farms remaining in Foxdenton until the late 2010s. The commencement of the Broadway Green housing development will, however, see the area become more suburban in character. The farmhouse at Foxdenton Farm is a grade II listed building.

Early 19th century gazetteers described Foxdenton as a village in the township of Chadderton.

== Foxdenton Hall ==
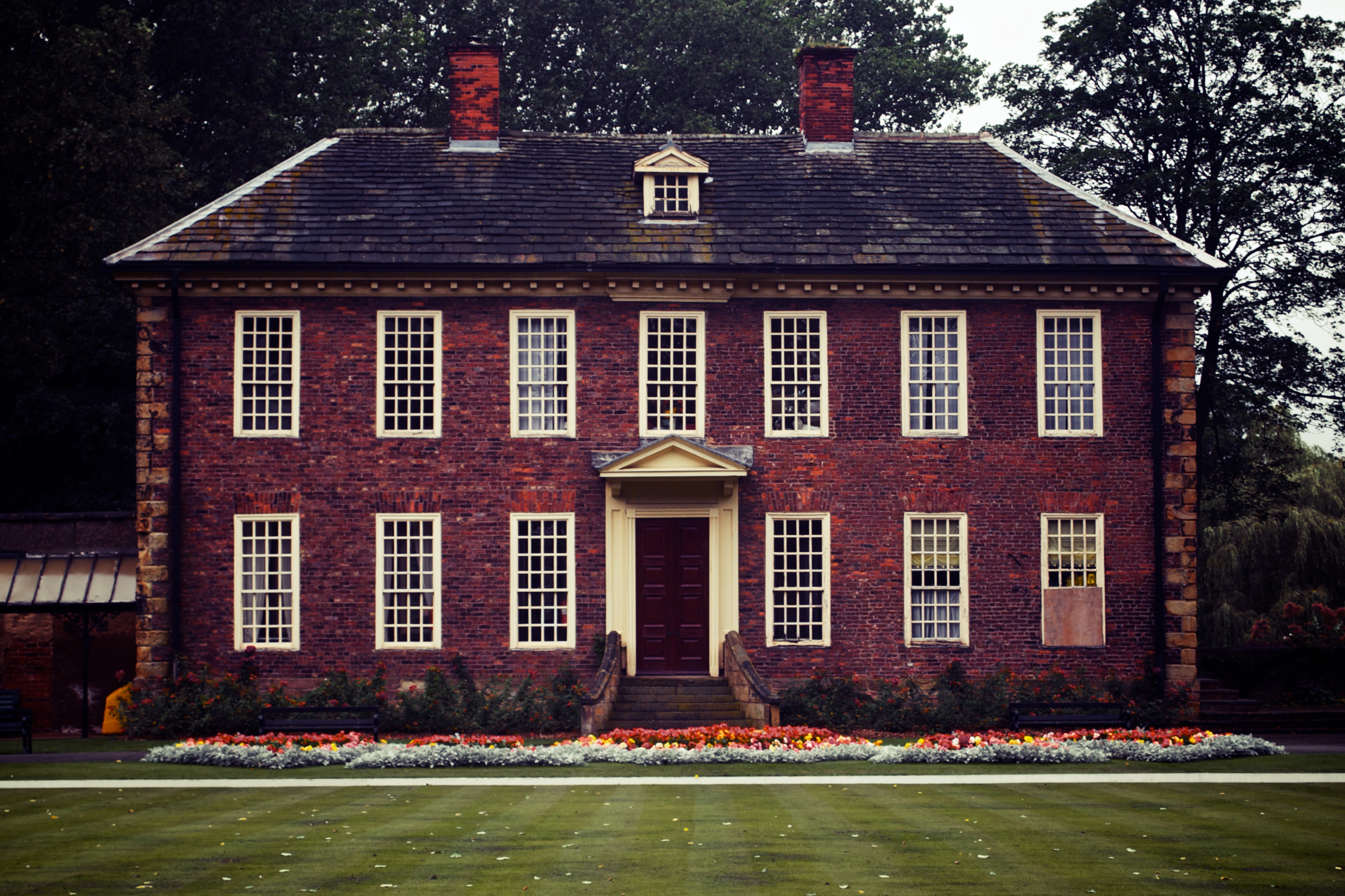
Foxdenton Hall, Chadderton

Foxdenton Hall is a Grade II* listed country house which stands in Foxdenton Park. It is a two-storey Georgian house with an English garden wall bond exterior and its own private gardens.

It was built between 1710 and 1730 for Alexander Radclyffe on the base of a previous hall built in 1620 for William Ratclyffe. The hall and the adjoining park were leased by the Radclyffe family in 1922 to Chadderton Council, who opened the site to the public. In 1960 the council took over ownership of the hall, by which time it was in a state of disrepair, and fully restored it in 1965. In 2003 a local group called Friends of Foxdenton began fundraising and operated a café and toilet facility in the hall for park visitors. The facility was closed in 2011 after being declared unsafe by the council. In 2016 the community group Chadderton Together obtained a licensing agreement to seek funding for refurbishing the building and the adjacent pavilion. Oldham Council supported the project with a £30,000 grant, backed by ward councillors.

== Foxdenton Business Park ==
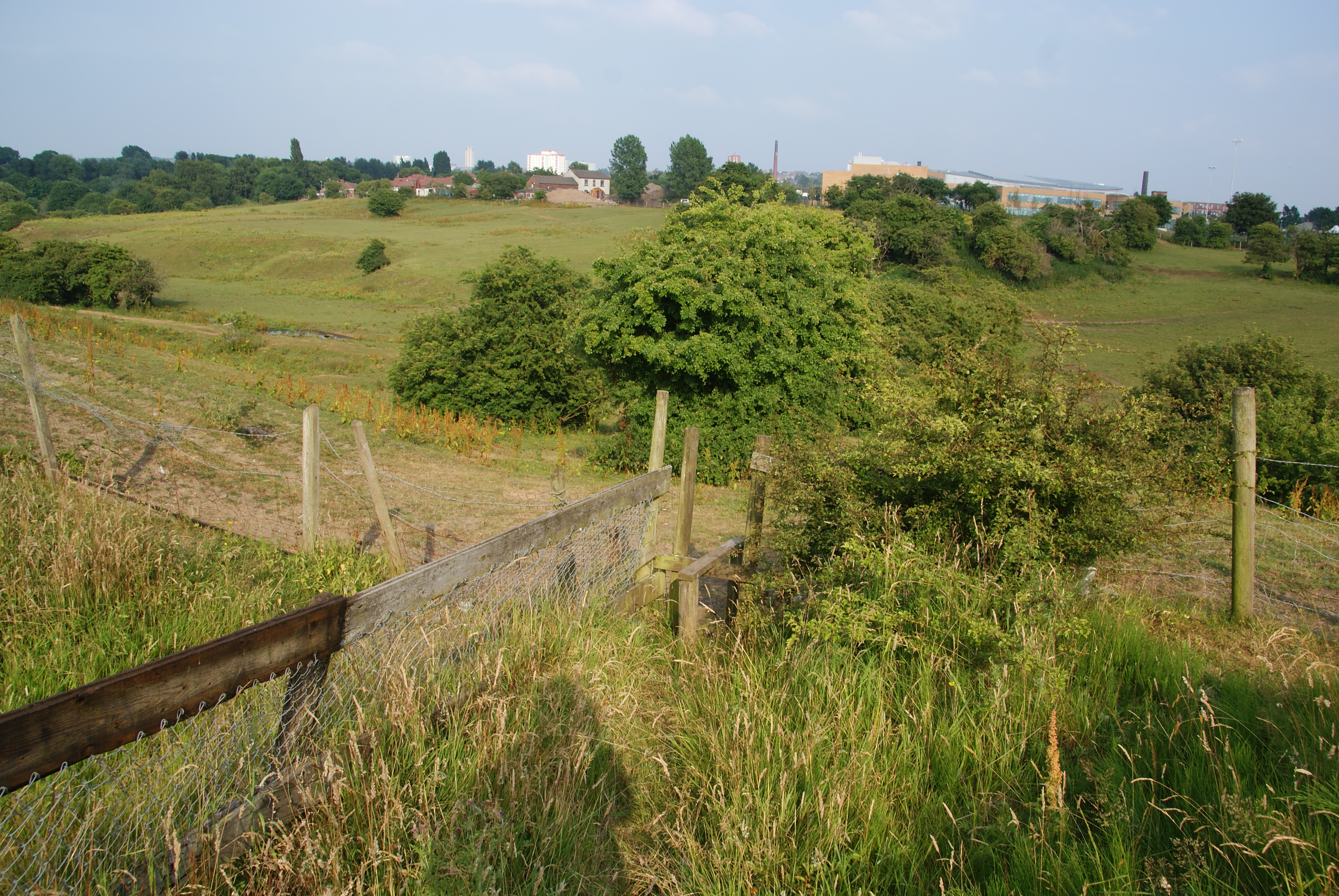
Land at Foxdenton earmarked for development

A business and housing development on a predominantly greenfield site in and around Foxdenton. Plans, which have now commenced, have been revealed for the creation of up to 450 homes and a business park in the area. A protest group, Foxdenton and District Protection Group, was set up to oppose the plans. The plans for the development, given the name 'Broadway Green', were approved by Oldham Council in February 2014. The ongoing development will be completed in an estimated time scale of six to fifteen years.

== Transport ==
Bee Network operates bus service 415 to Oldham and to Middleton via Alkrington.
