= Firwood Park =

Coordinates: 53.545624°N 2.1658737°W

- Location within Greater Manchester
- OS grid reference: SD 89106 05456
- Metropolitan borough: Oldham
- Metropolitan county: Greater Manchester
- Region: North West
- Country: England
- Sovereign state: United Kingdom
- Post town: OLDHAM
- Postcode district: OL9
- Dialling code: 0161
- Police: Greater Manchester
- Fire: Greater Manchester
- Ambulance: North West
- UK Parliament: Oldham West and Royton

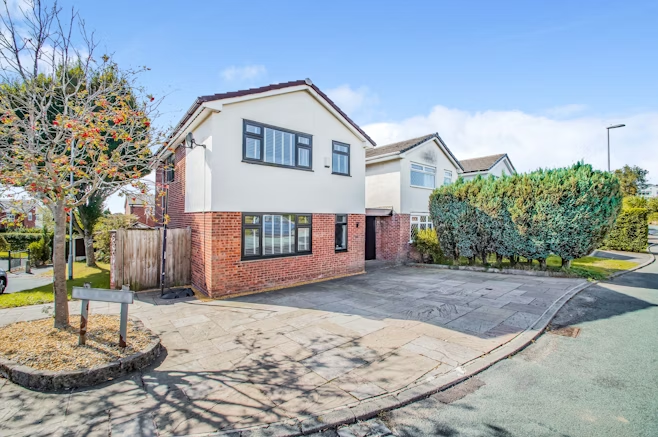
Firwood Park housing estate in Chadderton, United Kingdom.

Firwood Park is a suburban area of Chadderton in the Metropolitan Borough of Oldham, Greater Manchester. It is located a little over one mile to the west of Chadderton's commercial centre on Middleton Road and is contiguous with the Mills Hill, Chadderton Park and Middleton Junction areas of the town.

A development of 749 houses, Firwood Park was built in 1990 on a vast tract of land, which at one time was claimed to be the largest private residential development in Europe.

== History ==
In 1844 James Cheetham built the Firwood Mill at the side of the Rochdale Canal close to Mills Hill. His family lived at Firwood House which was set in its own grounds on the other side of the canal, close to the industrial hamlet of Drummer Hill. This house was demolished many decades ago but its name is perpetuated in the Firwood Park estate. Firwood Mill was demolished in 1960.

== Transport ==
Bee Network operates services 396 to Middleton and to Ashton-under-Lyne via Chadderton town centre, Werneth and Bardsley and service 59 to Manchester city centre via Middleton and Cheetham Hill and to Oldham via Chadderton town centre.
