= Chadderton Park =

Suburb of Chadderton, Greater Manchester, England

Coordinates: 53.551757°N 2.1582139°W

- Location within Greater Manchester
- OS grid reference: SD 89615 06137
- Metropolitan borough: Oldham
- Metropolitan county: Greater Manchester
- Region: North West
- Country: England
- Sovereign state: United Kingdom
- Post town: OLDHAM
- Postcode district: OL9
- Dialling code: 0161
- Police: Greater Manchester
- Fire: Greater Manchester
- Ambulance: North West
- UK Parliament: Oldham West and Royton

Chadderton Park is a suburban area of Chadderton in the Metropolitan Borough of Oldham, Greater Manchester.

It is located a little under one mile to the west of Chadderton's commercial centre on Middleton Road and is contiguous with the Mills Hill and Firwood Park areas of the town.

Semi-rural Chadderton Fold lies to the north.

== History ==
Now a suburban area of Chadderton, Chadderton Park was an area of extensive parkland lying to the south of the now demolished Chadderton Hall manor house and was an area that stretched south as far as Middleton Road. Archery contests were a frequent event on the parkland in the 18th and early 19th centuries. The parkland also drew large crowds of spectators for cavalry reviews during this period.

In 1912 the land was used by the now defunct Chadderton Golf Club, a nine-hole course. The course lay opposite what later became Chadderton Hall Park. After the First World War the club moved to a new course at Acres near Mills Hill. The club's affairs were wound up in 1942.

At the outbreak of the First World War the land was taken over by the military authorities for an army camp — the Chadderton Army Camp.

== Transport ==
Bee Network provide the following bus services in the area:

59 to Manchester city centre via Middleton and Cheetham Hill and to Oldham,

396 to Middleton and to Ashton-under-Lyne via Chadderton town centre, Werneth and Bardsley.
