= Listed buildings in Oldham =

Oldham is a town in the Metropolitan Borough of Oldham, Greater Manchester, England, and it is unparished. The town and the surrounding countryside contain 102 listed buildings that are recorded in the National Heritage List for England. Of these, four are listed at Grade II*, the middle grade, and the others are at Grade II, the lowest grade.

Until the coming of the Industrial Revolution, Oldham was a small settlement in an agricultural region. By the early 19th century, it had become an important centre for handloom weaving. The cotton spinning industry grew, initially though small firms, and later by large mills. By the late 19th century, "Oldham was the leading mill town in the world". In the town were the factories of Platt Brothers, who were the largest manufacturers of cotton processing machines in the world. Many of the cotton mills were designed by members of the firm of Stott and Sons. Since the decline of the cotton industry, many mills have been demolished, and others have been converted for other uses.

The listed buildings reflect this history, the oldest ones being houses, farmhouses and farm buildings. Then came houses with facilities for domestic weaving, with workshop windows on the upper storeys, and later the large cotton mills. As the wealth of the town grew, so did the buildings, including churches, civic buildings and commercial buildings. Local philanthropists contributed to some of the buildings, and they are commemorated in memorials.

== Key ==
Grade	Criteria
II*	Particularly important buildings of more than special interest
II	Buildings of national importance and special interest

== Buildings ==
Name and location	Photograph	Date	Notes	Grade
1–5 Hollins Road; 53.52573°N 2.11848°W		Early 17th century (possible)	Originally Hathershaw Hall, later divided into five dwellings, and later into two. It is in stone and has a stone-flagged roof with coped gables, two storeys, a central range, and two parallel ranges. The windows are mullioned or mullioned and transomed, and on two of the gables are ball finials.	II*
Werneth Hall; 53.53361°N 2.12872°W	—	17th century (or earlier)	The building has been extensively altered. It is in sandstone with a roof partly in Welsh slate and partly in stone flags. There are two storeys with a cellar, and a main range with two cross-wings and coped gables, and later extensions. The windows are mullioned and transomed. The main entrance has a moulded architrave, and to the left is an inserted French window.	II
Manor House and Cottage; 53.53305°N 2.06260°W	—	Late 17th century (probable)	The house is the earlier, the cottage dating from the 18th century. They are in stone with stone flagged roofs, and have two storeys. The house has two bays, a double-depth plan, and a parallel range at the rear. The cottage projects forward from the left part of the house, and has one bay. The windows are mullioned, and some contain replacement casements.	II
Bardsley House; 53.50953°N 2.10840°W	—	1713	The house was altered and extended in the 19th and 20th centuries. It is in stone with a Welsh slate roof, and has two storeys, three bays, and a double-depth plan. The central doorway has a moulded architrave and a segmental pediment, and the windows have chamfered mullions in moulded architraves.	II
Bank Top Farmhouse; 53.51544°N 2.10111°W	—	Early 18th century	A stone farmhouse with a stone flagged roof. There are two low storeys and three bays. In the centre is a gabled porch, and to the right is another doorway. The windows are replacements.	II
Barn, Alders Farm; 53.52283°N 2.08595°W	—	Early 18th century (probable)	The barn is in sandstone with a stone flagged roof and four bays. It contains a wide entry, a narrower entry opposite, windows, doorways, some of which are blocked, and two small loft openings.	II
Knowls Lane Farmhouse; 53.53310°N 2.06278°W	—	Early 18th century	The farmhouse, later a private house, has been extensively altered. It is in stone with a stone flagged roof, two storeys, and three bays. On the front is a porch, most of the windows are replacements, and some mullioned windows remain.	II
Lane Head Farm; 53.52884°N 2.06254°W		Early 18th century	Originally a farmhouse with a cottage to the left and a barn further to the left, later one house. It is in stone with a Welsh slate roof, and two storeys. The former farmhouse has three bays and a gabled porch, the former cottage has two bays, and the barn has a gabled porch. The windows are mullioned.	II
Alders Farmhouse; 53.52250°N 2.08564°W	—	1734	The farmhouse possibly contains earlier material. It is in sandstone with a stone flagged roof, it has two storeys, and consists of a main range and cross-wings. Some windows are mullioned, others have been altered, and over the doorway is a datestone. To the east is a dairy with two low storeys, one bay, and a gabled wing at the rear.	II
61 and 63 Kelverlow Street; 53.54098°N 2.08887°W	—	c. 1750	Originally one house, later divided into two, it is in brick with a moulded eaves cornice, and has a Welsh slate roof with coped gables. There are two storeys and five bays, the central three bays projecting slightly and pedimented. In the middle is a doorway that has a Tuscan architrave with draped urns on the columns, a traceried fanlight, and a pediment. To the left a window has been converted into a doorway to No. 61, and the windows are sashes.	II
1, 3 and 5 Whitehall Lane; 53.56605°N 2.06447°W	—	Mid-18th century	Originally three houses, later two, in stone with a stone-slate roof. They have two storeys and mullioned windows. Nos. 1 and 3 have two bays and a lean-to porch on the left gable end. No. 5 is higher, and has two bays, one added later.	II
Flash Cottages; 53.53212°N 2.06077°W		18th century	A group of seven cottages that were extended in the 19th century. They are in stone and have roofs partly of stone flags and partly of Welsh slate. The outer cottages project forward. Many of the openings have been altered, including blocked and inserted doorways. The windows are a mix of mullioned windows and casement windows.	II
11 James Street; 53.55403°N 2.08299°W	—	Late 18th century	A stone house with a stone-flagged roof, two low storeys, two bays, and a rear outshut. On the front is a gabled porch with a doorway flanked by windows with angled heads. Elsewhere there is one casement window, and the other windows are mullioned. To the left is an extension with a central gable.	II
125–131 Lane Head Road; 53.52767°N 2.05972°W	—	Late 18th century	A row of four weavers' cottages in stone with stone flagged roofs. Each cottage has three storeys, a double-depth plan, and one bay. Projecting from the front is a half-gabled extension, and there is a lean-to extension on the right gable end. The windows are mullioned, including an eleven-light workshop window on the top floor, and there are some replacement casements.	II
133–145 Lane Head Road; 53.52676°N 2.05911°W	—	Late 18th century (probable)	A terrace of eight stone houses with Welsh slate roofs. They have two storeys, and each house has one bay. The three houses to the right are taller, and have lean-to extensions. The windows are mullioned.	II
264–278 Roundthorn Road; 53.53494°N 2.08792°W	—	Late 18th century	A terrace of eight brick cottages with a stone flagged roof. They have two low storeys, and each cottage has one bay. The end cottages have doorways in the gable ends, and the other cottages have central doorways. Some of the cottages have mullioned windows, and in the others the windows are replacements.	II
285 Greenacres Road; 53.54622°N 2.08109°W	—	Late 18th century	A stone house with a stone-slate roof, two storeys and two bays. The main doorway has a stone architrave, and there are two further doorways, one blocked, and one converted into a window. The windows have chamfered mullions.	II
High Knowls; 53.53016°N 2.05977°W	—	Late 18th century	A row of four cottages extended to the right and to the front in two later phases. They are in stone and have Welsh slate roofs, two and three storeys, and a basement on the right. The original two cottages have mullioned windows, and in the other two cottages the windows are replacements.	II
Knowls Lane Farm; 53.53318°N 2.06306°W	—	Late 18th century (probable)	A stone house with a stone flagged roof, two storeys and three bays. There are two doorways, the main doorway with a chamfered architrave. Some windows are casements, and others are mullioned.	II
The Cottage; 53.53035°N 2.08585°W	—	Late 18th century	A stone house with a stone-late roof that was extended in brick to the right by one bay in the early 19th century. It has two storeys, four bays, a doorway with a heavy stone lintel, and two further doorways, one with a gabled porch. The windows are replacements with mullions, and in the left gable end are steps leading to the upper floor.	II
Werneth Lodge; 53.53463°N 2.13194°W	—	c. 1790	The house was refronted in 1874. It is in brick with stone dressings, a moulded eaves band, slate-hanging on the gables, and a stone flagged roof. There are two storeys and three bays, a recessed lower wing with a hipped roof to the right, a later single-storey extension further to the right, and a small two-storey extension at the rear. The central doorway has a segmentally-headed architrave and a fanlight, and above it is a sash window. The outer bays project forward as a two-storey bay window, with sash windows in both floors.	II
Hey Lane Mill; 53.53864°N 2.07191°W	—	1800	Also known as Acorn Mill, it was extended up to 1823, and partly rebuilt in about 1830–1840. The mill is in stone with string courses, parapets, and a slate roof, and it consists of two ranges at right angles with four storeys. The east range has twelve bays, and the south range has eleven bays and an extension to the northeast. Most of the windows are flat-headed, and in the gable end of the south range are Palladian windows.	II
1–7 Holts Lane; 53.52856°N 2.08212°W	—	c. 1800	A row of cottages, originally four, later three, in brick with a Welsh slate roof. They have two storeys and four bays. All the windows are replacements.	II
7 and 9 Church Lane; 53.54242°N 2.11229°W		c. 1800	A pair of houses, later offices, in brick with quoins on the left, a moulded modillion eaves cornice, stone dressings, and a Welsh slate roof. They have three storeys and a symmetrical front of five bays. There are three doorways, two on the front and one in the left return, all with rusticated surrounds, and the windows are replacements in architraves.	II
8 Church Lane; 53.54232°N 2.11202°W	—	c. 1800	A house, later offices, in brick with a Welsh slate roof. There are two storeys and a symmetrical front of five bays. The central doorway has a rusticated architrave and a fanlight, and the windows are replacement sashes.	II
11 Church Lane; 53.54245°N 2.11211°W		c. 1800	A house, later an office, in brick with stone dressings and a Welsh slate roof. There are three storeys and a symmetrical front of five bays. In the centre is a Tuscan doorway with a fanlight and a pediment. The windows are sashes with flat brick arched heads and stone sills.	II
Independent Methodist Chapel; 53.54036°N 2.11625°W		1815	The chapel is in brick with a Welsh slate roof on a sloping site. It has four bays each containing a tall window, and a basement at the rear. To the right is a doorway with an architrave and a pediment, and in front are cast iron railings and gates. Inside there are galleries on three sides and box pews.	II*
121 Union Street; 53.54128°N 2.10771°W		c. 1820	A house, later offices, in brick with a slate roof, three storeys, three bays, and angle pilasters. The central bay projects slightly, and contains a round-headed doorway with a moulded architrave, an entablature on console brackets, and a fanlight. The windows are sashes, those on the ground floor having three lights. At the top is a cornice, a blocking course, and a shallow central pediment. At the rear is a round-arched stair window.	II
Former Coach House, 38 Manchester Road; 53.53486°N 2.13204°W	—	c. 1820	The coach house, later used for other purposes, is in brick with a moulded cornice, a blocking course, and a hipped Welsh slate roof. It has two storeys and five bays. On the front are three segmental-headed carriage entrances, the central one the largest, and on the upper floor are five round-headed sash windows. At the rear are two round headed openings and four sash windows above, and in the gable end is a loading door and a hoist.	II
11 Church Terrace; 53.54228°N 2.11144°W	—	Early 19th century	A house, later offices, incorporating earlier material, with a front in brick on a stone plinth, angle quoins, a stone right return, and a Welsh slate roof. It has three storeys and a front of two bays. In the left bay is a tall round-headed archway leading to internal stairs, and the windows are sashes with stuccoed heads. In the return are two gabled wings and a wing beyond.	II
Ten houses 53.52264°N 2.08802°W	—	Early 19th century	A terrace of ten brick houses with stone flagged roofs. They have two low storeys, one bay each, and a doorway at the front and the rear. On the front the windows are sashes, and at the rear they are mullioned.	II
St James' Church; 53.54578°N 2.09545°W		1827–28	A Commissioners' church by Francis Goodwin, with the chancel added in 1883. It is in stone, with a Welsh slate roof, and consists of a nave, north and south aisles, a shallow canted apse at the east end, a west tower, and vestries flanking the tower. The tower has clasping buttresses, a parapet above the second stage, and flying buttresses to the octagonal belfry stage that contains clock faces. At the top is an embattled parapet with corner pinnacles.	II
Church of St Mary and St Peter; 53.54263°N 2.11125°W		1827–1830	The church, designed by Richard Lane, is in stone with a Welsh slate roof. It consists of a nave and aisles under a single roof, a shallow chancel with vestries, and a west tower flanked by porches. The tower has four stages with a west doorway above which is a three-light Perpendicular window, octagonal angle buttresses rising to pinnacles, clock faces, and an embattled parapet. Between the bays of the nave and at the corners of the chancel the buttresses rise to form pinnacles with coronets, and along the sides of the church are embattled parapets.	II*
Henshaw's Bluecoat School; 53.54604°N 2.10793°W		1829–1834	The school was designed by Richard Lane in Tudor style. It is in ashlar stone with a Welsh slate roof, and has a front of 17 bays. In the centre is a three-storey entrance block, linked by two-storey ranges to three-storey pavilions. There are octagonal embattled turrets in the entrance block and in the pavilions. The windows are mullioned, or mullioned and transomed, and above the linking ranges are embattled parapets.	II
Lodge, Bluecoat School; 53.54471°N 2.10843°W	—	c. 1830	The lodge is in Tudor style, it is in stone, and has a Welsh slate roof with coped gables. There is one storey, a central doorway with a hood mould, casement windows with architraves, and a parapet.	II
The Royal Oak public house 53.54182°N 2.10501°W		Early to mid-19th century	The public house was extended and refronted in 1872 and its interior remodelled in 1928–29. It is in brick on a sandstone plinth, with sandstone dressings and a slate roof, hipped to the right. The pub stands on a corner site, it has three storeys and a cellar, and a front of three bays. The central doorway has a round head, a semicircular fanlight, voussoirs, a large shaped keystone, a moulded hood mould, and a double string course. It is flanked by decorative windows, and on the upper floor are sash windows. In the right return is a round-headed doorway, and the windows are casements.	II
9–15 Holts Lane; 53.52858°N 2.08183°W	—	1837	A row of three brick houses with stone flagged roofs and two storeys. Nos. 13 and 15 are the earlier, and have three bays. The doorways, ground floor windows and the central window above have Gothick arches, the windows with Y-tracery. The other two windows on the upper floor are mullioned, and above the doorway of No. 15 is an inscribed and dated plaque. No. 11 to the left is taller and probably later. It has two bays, a central doorway and ground floor windows with Gothick arches, and mullioned windows on the upper floor.	II
Town Hall; 53.54186°N 2.11121°W		1841	The former town hall was extended in 1879–80, and again in 1917. It is in Greek Revival style, with a front in ashlar stone, the ground floor rusticated, and a slate roof. There are two storeys and seven bays, the middle three bays forming portico with four unfluted Ionic columns and the city arms in the pediment. In the outer bays are full-height pilasters and sash windows. The sides are in brick with stone dressings.	II
Holy Trinity Church, Bardsley; 53.51333°N 2.10819°W		1844	The church is in stone with Welsh slate roofs, and is in Romanesque style. It consists of a nave, north and south aisles, north and south transepts, a chancel with north and south vestries, and a west tower. The tower has three stages, a round-arched doorway, a clock face, buttresses rising to form pinnacles with overhanging pyramidal roofs, and an openwork parapet. On the sides of the church are lancet windows, the transepts have wheel windows, and in the chancel are stepped round-headed lancets.	II
Holy Trinity Church, Waterhead; 53.55063°N 2.07393°W		1846–47	The church was designed by E. H. Shellard in Early English style, and the steeple was added later. It is in stone and has a roof in Welsh slate with ridge cresting. The church consists of a nave with a clerestory, north and south aisles, a north porch, a chancel with a north vestry, and a west steeple. The steeple has a tower with two stages, buttresses, a west door, a corbel table, and a broach spire with lucarnes. The windows are lancets, and at the east end are three stepped lancets.	II
Werneth Park Adult Education Centre; 53.53291°N 2.12935°W	—	c. 1849	Originally Lees House, later used for other purposes, it is in Italianate style. The house is in brick with stone dressings, string courses, a modillion cornice, overhanging eaves, and a Welsh slate roof. There are two storeys and a square plan. The porch has double doors that have an architrave with a shell hood and a panelled parapet. To the left is a canted bay window, and the other windows are sashes. On the garden front are pedimented gables, a square bay window, and a fretted parapet.	II
Hartford Works; 53.53876°N 2.13138°W		c. 1850	A cotton mill that was altered in 1909, it is in red brick on a rusticated sandstone plinth, and has a continuous string course above the ground floor. There are six storeys and fronts of 20 and five bays, and the windows have segmental heads. On the east side is a stair tower with a water tank, a string course, and lettering in white brick.	II
Garden wall, gate piers and gates, Manor House; 53.53079°N 2.08468°W	—	Mid-19th century	The gate piers and gates were added in 1901. The wall is in rubble stone, and the piers are in banded ashlar. On the inner faces of the piers is scrolled decoration, and they are surmounted by ball finials.	II
St Thomas' Church, Werneth; 53.53469°N 2.12293°W		1853–1855	A Commissioners' church in Early English style, transepts were added in 1868, a vestry and organ chamber in the 1880s, and a west porch in Perpendicular style in 1908. The church is in stone with a Welsh slate roof, and consists of a nave with a clerestory, a west porch, north and south aisles, north and south transepts, a chancel with a south chapel and organ chamber and a north vestry, and a northwest steeple. The steeple has four stages, angle buttresses, a west door, and a broach spire with lucarnes.	II
Union Street Church; 53.54095°N 2.10959°W		1855	Built as a Congregational church, and later used by other denominations, it is in rusticated stone with a slate roof. The church consists of a nave with aisles and a tower, with a wooden clerestory above the nave. At the base of the tower steps lead up to an arched entrance with a recessed porch, and above this is a six-light window with Geometrical tracery. The tower is flanked by buttresses, at the top is an embattled parapet, and the windows are lancets. In front of the entrance are cast iron gates and railings on a low wall with stone piers.	II
Lyceum and School of Art; 53.54072°N 2.11078°W		1855–56	The Lyceum was built first, and the School of Art added in 1880–81 to an almost identical design. The building is in ashlar stone, the ground floor rusticated, and with a Welsh slate roof. There are two storeys, and each part has a symmetrical front of seven bays. Each part has a central doorway, that of the Lyceum with a round arch and fanlight, and an architrave with carving in relief, and the School of Art has a square head and fanlight. Above each doorway is a cast iron balcony, over which is a three-light window with a double-arched architrave and foliate capitals. On the ground floor are square-headed sash windows, and on the upper floor the windows are round-headed, with carved laurel wreaths above. At the top is a parapet with urns, and above each entrance is an inscribed pediment.	II
91 and 93 Windsor Road; 53.53429°N 2.12609°W	—	c. 1860	A pair of brick houses with a Welsh slate roof, two storeys, and a symmetrical front of five bays. In the centre is a square bay window flanked by doorways with Tuscan architraves in recessed arches. The outer bays contain canted bay windows, on the upper floor are sash windows, and on the roof is a single gabled dormer.	II
99 Windsor Road; 53.53403°N 2.12577°W	—	c. 1860	A brick house with a moulded eaves cornice and a Welsh slate roof. There are two storeys and a symmetrical front of three bays. In the centre is a doorway with a Tuscan architrave in a recessed segmental arch. The outer bays contain canted bay windows that have parapets with scrolled low relief decoration. On the upper floor are sash windows in moulded architraves with segmental heads, and the sills are carried on brackets.	II
109 and 111 Windsor Road; 53.53356°N 2.12509°W	—	c. 1860	A pair of brick houses, later offices, with a string course, a moulded eaves cornice, and a Welsh slate roof. There are two storeys, and a symmetrical front of five bays. In the centre is a square bay window flanked by doorways with Tuscan architraves in recessed arches. The outer bays contain canted bay windows, and on the upper floor are sash windows.	II
Conservatory, Werneth Park; 53.53358°N 2.12977°W	—	c. 1860	The conservatory is in brick with stone dressings. It has an octagonal entrance block on a square base, with a Welsh slate roof, and a Tuscan portico with a round-headed doorway. The windows are sashes, and there is bow window. In the centre is a pediment flanked by a modillion cornice on each side, and an open parapet with urns at the angles. On the roof is a wooden lantern, and glasshouses extend to the northwest.	II
58–68 Bartlemore Street, 5–13 Melrose Street, 15 and 17 Sydenham Street and 1 and 3 Albert Mount; 53.55136°N 2.09939°W	—	1862	A block of 16 houses around a courtyard, they are in brick with dressings in stone, terracotta and polychrome brick. The houses have two storeys, and each house has a double-depth plan and two bays. The doorways have pilasters, and are round-headed with alternate red and white brick arches. On the ground floor are paired sash windows with similar arched heads, and on the upper floor are sash windows with flat heads. On the north and south sides of the block are entries with semicircular heads. Around the top of the block is a polychrome frieze with Greek key decoration, and a wooden eaves cornice on yellow brick brackets.	II
Western Lodge, Alexandra Park; 53.53562°N 2.10770°W	—	1863	The lodge is in stone with rusticated dressings, quoins, modillion eaves, and a hipped Welsh slate roof, and is in Italianate style. It has a single storey and a tower to the left of the entrance. The door has a plain architrave and a fanlight. In the left return is a canted bay window, and a semicircular dormer window, the other windows being sashes with entablatures.	II
Eastern Lodge, Alexandra Park; 53.53417°N 2.09796°W	—	c. 1863	The lodge is in stone with rusticated quoins, a moulded eaves cornice, and a hipped Welsh slate roof, and it is in Italianate style. It has 1½ storeys and two bays. There is a projecting porch to the north with a round-arched doorway, and on the roof are semicircular dormers. In the end wall are sash windows with an entablature above.	II
Fountain, Alexandra Park; 53.53351°N 2.10472°W		1865	The fountain has a circular stone base, and a central shaft in polished granite. Four columns in polished granite with foliate capitals support a shallow basin. This is repeated in a smaller scale above, supporting a smaller basin that contains a statue of a boy holding a dolphin.	II
Statue of Joseph Howarth; 53.53232°N 2.10524°W		1868	The statue is in Alexandra Park, and commemorates Joseph Howarth, a man blind from birth who was a bellman and a Methodist lay preacher. There is a tall plinth in polished granite on which stands a life-size statue in sandstone depicting a man wearing a top hat, and carrying a bell and a stick.	II
Union Club; 53.54089°N 2.10986°W	—	1869	Once a Freemasons' Hall, the left bay was added later, followed by an extension to the rear in about 1924. It is built in rusticated stone with a Welsh slate roof, and is in Greek Revival style. There are two storeys, a basement, and an asymmetrical front of six bays. The second and sixth bays project forward, and have a cornice above a triglyph frieze with a pediment at the top. The entrance in the second bay is approached by steps, and has a portico with fluted Doric columns. The windows are tall casements with architraves and moulded aprons; three windows on the upper floor are blind. At the top is a triglyph frieze and an overhanging cornice. The rear range is in brick with stone dressings.	II
St Patrick's Church; 53.53919°N 2.11903°W		1869–70	A Roman Catholic church that was remodelled in 1907. It is in stone with a Welsh slate roof, and is in Early English style. The church consists of a nave with a west narthex and a clerestory, lean-to aisles, projecting confessionals on the north side, and an apsidal chancel. At the west end is a gabled porch, and on the west gable is a bellcote on corbels. The windows are lancets.	II
Shakespeare Terrace; 53.53580°N 2.10674°W	—	1870	A terrace of ten brick houses with a dog-tooth and dentiled eaves cornice and Welsh slate roofs. They are in Gothic style, and have two storeys and two bays each. All the houses have a doorway to the left with a recessed porch, and a stilted surround with foliate capitals. To the right is a canted bay window, and on the upper floor are sash windows with triangular arched heads.	II
Gateway to former Blind Workshops; 53.53380°N 2.12946°W	—	c. 1870	The gateway is in brick with stone dressings, and consists of an arched entry with concave flanking walls that have terminal piers with stepped pyramidal caps. The arch has voussoirs and a keystone, and at the top is a pediment containing a crest in a roundel and surmounted by a spiked ball finial.	II
St Thomas' School; 53.53497°N 2.12230°W	—	c. 1870	The school is in stone with a Welsh slate roof. There is a single storey and a symmetrical front with three gables. The outer gables are larger, and each has a gabled porch on its inner side. On the central gable is a lean-to porch, and above is a recessed arch containing a rose window and a coped gable and an iron finial.	II
Wall, railings and gates, St Thomas' churchyard 53.53454°N 2.12332°W	—	c. 1870	The stone plinth wall encircles the churchyard, and carries cast iron railings consisting of short posts and long rails. There are four gateways that have stone piers with stepped copings, and timber gates.	II
Workshop building east of Hartford Works; 53.53892°N 2.13079°W	—	c. 1870	A brick building with stone dressings, a modillion eaves course, a cornice, and a roof partly of Welsh slate and partly of asbestos sheet. There are three storeys, and a front of 16 bays. The gables are pedimented and there is an oculus in the south gable. On the front is a segmental arch with a rusticated surround and an entablature. The windows have arched heads with keystones.	II
Werneth Grange Convent; 53.53082°N 2.13203°W	—	1871	A house, later a convent, in Gothic style, and built in stone with a Welsh slate roof. It was extended in the 20th century with the addition of a chapel and accommodation block. The house has two storeys, with an attic and a square plan. On the three-bay entrance front are two porches, one half-gabled, the other with two storeys and a swept conical roof. The windows vary, some are mullioned and transomed, others are sash windows, there are oriel windows, one with a spirelet, and bay windows. The chapel extends to the east, and is in Early English style.	II
St Thomas' Church, Moorside; 53.56451°N 2.07598°W		1872	A vestry was added to the church in 1833, which is in stone with a Welsh slate roof. It consists of a nave with a clerestory, north and south lean-to aisles, a south porch, a south vestry, a chancel, and a west tower. The tower has angle buttresses, a west doorway above which is a three-light window with Decorated tracery, a clock face, octagonal pilasters rising to pinnacles, and an openwork parapet. At the northeast is an octagonal stair turret with a spirelet.	II
Church of St Stephen and All Martyrs; 53.54798°N 2.10435°W	—	1873	The church is in stone and has a slate roof with coped gables with finials, and is in early Decorated style. It consists of a nave and chancel in one cell with a clerestory, north and south aisles, a north transept, and a southwest tower. The tower has three stages, diagonal buttresses, a southwest stair turret, and a pyramidal roof with louvred gablets.	II
Former Post Office; 53.54060°N 2.10995°W		1875–1877	The former post office, later used for other purposes, is in brick on a stone plinth, with stone dressings and a Welsh slate roof, and is in Neoclassical style. There are two storeys, seven bays, and two doorways, each with a moulded architrave. The windows are sashes with moulded architraves between pilasters, and above the ground floor is a cornice. At the top of the building is a cornice, a stepped parapet and a central shallow pediment.	II
Church of St Mark with Christ Church; 53.53553°N 2.09673°W		1876	The church is in sandstone and has a Welsh slate roof with cross finials on the gables. It consists of nave with a clerestory, north and south lean-to aisles, a chancel with a north vestry, and a southeast steeple. The steeple has a two-stage tower, clasping buttresses, an east doorway, a corbel table with a parapet, and a broach spire with lucarnes. Most of the windows are lancets, and the east window has five lights and Decorated tracery.	II
Former Vicarage and Hall; 53.53571°N 2.09660°W	—	1876 (probable)	Originally the vicarage and hall for the Church of St Mark with Christ Church, later offices, they are in stone with a Welsh slate roof. The former vicarage has two storeys, two bays, and a central arched doorway in an arched porch. Flanking the doorway are three-light windows with arched heads. On the upper floor are three-light windows with moulded lintels, above which are gables with quatrefoils. At the rear is a wing forming the hall, and in front of the building is a stone plinth wall with cast iron railings.	II
Thorneycroft; 53.53212°N 2.12599°W	—	c. 1877	A house, later a school, in Gothic style. It is in red brick with rusticated stone dressings and a slate roof with cresting. There are two storeys with an attic, and a square plan. At the entrance is a gabled porch and a doorway with a foliate hood mould. The central bay has a hipped roof with brattishing. The windows vary; some are sashes, some are mullioned and transomed, and there are bay windows.	II
St Margaret's Church; 53.52452°N 2.13609°W		1877–1879	The church was designed by R. Knill Freeman, and the tower was added in 1906. It is in stone with slate roofs and ridge cresting, and consists of a nave with a clerestory, north and south aisles, north and south transepts, a chancel with a north vestry and south chapel, and a northwest tower. The tower has three stages, clasping buttresses, a clock face, and an embattled parapet. The north transept has an octagonal turret with a spirelet. The windows along the aisles are lancets, and elsewhere are windows with Decorated tracery.	II
Statue of John Platt; 53.53503°N 2.10538°W		1878	The statue is in Alexandra Park and commemorates John Platt, a businessman and a Member of Parliament. It is by David Watson Stevenson, and consists of a polished granite shaft on a plinth on which is the standing figure of John Platt in bronze. Around the base of the shaft are four female seated figures, also in bronze.	II
10–14 Church Lane; 53.54240°N 2.11174°W	—	c. 1880	A row of three houses, later offices, in brick with a plain wooden eaves cornice, a Welsh slate roof, and glazed white brick at the rear. There are three storeys and eleven bays, and three doorways with architraves and pediments. The windows are sashes, those on the ground floor with hood moulds, and on the upper floors with brick arched heads.	II
Anchor Mill; 53.54408°N 2.12758°W		1881	A former steam-powered cotton spinning mill designed by Joseph Stott in brick on an iron frame and with a Welsh slate roof. It has five storeys and a main block with sides of 18 and six bays. There is an internal engine house and an external boiler house to the north. To the southeast is an office range and a tower, and the chimney is to the north.	II
Former office block of Platt Brothers; 53.53883°N 2.12987°W		1883	A brick office building in French Renaissance style, with stone dressings, a string course, an overhanging cornice, and a Welsh slate roof. There are two storeys and a front of 13 bays. The outer bays project forward as pavilions, and have hipped roofs with brattishing. The central bay also projects forward and contains a round-arched doorway with moulded corbels and a keystone. Above this bay is a tower with an oculus, a hipped roof and a clock with brattishing. The windows are round-headed, and those on the ground floor have aprons. Steps flanked by stone walls with cast iron railings lead up to the doorway.	II
Library and Art Gallery; 53.54072°N 2.10908°W		1883	The building was extended to the rear in 1893–94. It is in stone and has a roof of red tiles with a crested ridge. There are two tall storeys with a basement, and a symmetrical front with a central projecting block flanked by three bays on each side, behind which are two parallel ranges. In the central block, steps lead up to a doorway with a round arch with relief carving in the tympanum. Above this is an oriel window, and at the top is a coped gable on which stands a statue. The central block is linked to the outer bays by curved bays. The central outer bays each has a gabled dormer containing a rose window, and the other windows are mullioned and transomed.	II
Leesbrook Mill; 53.53683°N 2.07750°W		1884	A cotton spinning mill designed by Joseph Stott, it is in brick with an internal construction of cast iron, steel and brick, and with a multi-range slate roof. It has four storeys with a basement and 21 bays, a four-bay extension, a stair and sprinkler tower, and a chimney with white lettering. The windows have segmental arches. There is also a single-storey office building in Italianate style with seven bays, round-arched windows, and a parapet with a central pediment containing the name and date.	II
Ukrainian Catholic Church, wall and gatepiers 53.54730°N 2.12486°W		1888–1891	Originally an Anglican church, it was converted into a Ukrainian Catholic Church in 1988. The church is built in Ruabon red brick, with dressings in Yorkshire stone, and a slate roof, and is in Perpendicular Gothic style. It consists of a nave with a clerestory, north and south aisles, a chancel with a north chapel and a south vestry, and a northwest tower. The tower has three stages, buttresses, a northeast stair turret, a west doorway with a moulded surround, a fanlight, and a hood mould. The bell openings are paired, with colonnettes, and at the top is a pierced parapet and corner pinnacles. The grounds are enclosed by a stone wall with moulded copings, and gate piers, those at the entrance with decorative caps.	II
Lodges and gates, Hollinwood Cemetery; 53.51784°N 2.13290°W		1889	The lodges and gateway are in sandstone with Welsh slate roofs. The gateway has a central segmental arch and smaller side arches, all with a parapet above and each flanked by turrets. The gates are in cast iron. The principal lodge is to the left, and has two storeys and an L-shaped plan. There is a clock tower with a spire, a gabled porch, mullioned and transomed windows, and an oriel window. The right lodge is smaller, with a gabled dormer, sash windows, some with transoms, and a canted bay window.	II
National Westminster Bank; 53.54192°N 2.11085°W		c. 1890	The bank is in ashlar stone with quoins and a rusticated ground floor, and is in Neoclassical style. There are two storeys, four bays on Yorkshire Street and five on Greaves Street. The entrances are in the outer bays in Yorkshire Street, and have round-headed doorways with fanlights. The windows on the ground floor are round-headed, and on the upper floor they have segmental or triangular pediments with balustrading below. At the top is a cornice and a blocking course.	II
Midland Bank; 53.54101°N 2.10913°W		1892	The bank, in French Renaissance style, is ashlar-faced and has a Welsh slate roof. There are two storeys with a basement, and a front on Union Street of four bays. The outer bays project slightly and rise to form pavilion towers with hipped roofs and wrought iron brattishing. The entrance is in the left bay and has a porch with polished Ionic columns, an entablature, and a round-headed doorway. Between the bays are pilasters with Ionic capitals. The windows on the ground floor have square heads, and on the upper floor they have architraves with round heads. There are five bays on the Queen Street front containing round-headed windows, and another pavilion tower at the far end. In front of the entrance are decorative cast iron railings on a low wall.	II
County Court; 53.54254°N 2.11184°W		1894	The former county court, later a café and offices, was designed by Henry Tanner, and is in red brick with white terracotta dressings and a hipped Westmorland slate roof. There are two storeys with an attic, a symmetrical five-bay block, with an entrance bay to the left, and a lower block to the right. In the entrance bay is a shallow segmental arch above which is a three-light window with a frieze carved in relief with a coat of arms and an inscription, and an embattled parapet. On the ground floor of the central block are mullioned and transomed windows with a continuous hood mould. The upper floor has gabled dormers with polygonal pilasters rising to finials in the second and fourth bays. The right block contains another doorway and an oriel window on an elongated corbel.	II
Prudential Assurance Buildings; 53.54046°N 2.11222°W		1898–1901	An office building by Alfred Waterhouse, it is in red brick on a granite plinth, with buff and green terracotta dressings and a red tiled roof. There are three storeys with a basement and attics, and a symmetrical front with three bays flanked by polygonal four-storey turrets. At the base of the turrets are projecting gabled porches with round-headed doorways and flanking columns. On the ground floor is an arcade of round-headed windows, and on the upper floors the windows are mullioned and transomed. At the top is a modillion cornice and a lozenge frieze. Behind the turrets are wings extending to the rear, joined by a rear range.	II
Observatory, Alexandra Park; 53.53227°N 2.10537°W		1899	The observatory is in the form of a pagoda and has a square plan. Steps lead up to a polished granite plinth on which is a single room with a doorway and windows. Above this is a swept roof with segmental blind dormers, and a timber screen carrying another, smaller ogivally-arched roof, on which is an onion dome and a weathervane.	II
Oldham Equitable Co-operative Society Buildings; 53.54713°N 2.08923°W		1900	A shop, originally also containing meeting rooms and halls, now divided into separate retail units, it is in brick with ashlar facing, and has a Welsh slate roof and three storeys. There is a main block flanked by two bays to the left and five to the right, and a rear wing extending from the left. On the ground floor are modern shop fronts. On the middle floor of the main block are five windows with entablatures, over which is an inscribed frieze. Above this is a massive semicircular window and a coped gable flanked by pinnacles. The other bays each contain a semicircular-headed window on the middle floor, and five round-headed windows on the top floor.	II
Barclays Bank; 53.54216°N 2.11247°W	—	c. 1900	The bank, on a corner site, is faced with ashlar stone and has a Welsh slate roof. There are three storeys, four bays on High Street, four on the Lord Street return, a canted bay between them, and seven bays at the rear along Church Lane. The entrance is in the canted bay, and has a round-arched architrave, and at the top is a tower with a fretted parapet and a lead dome. The windows are recessed, between them are colonettes, and on the roof are dormers.	II
Ponsonby and Carlile Office; 53.54155°N 2.11058°W	—	1901	Built as a solicitors' office, and designed by Edgar Wood, it has an ashlar front, it is in brick at the rear, and has a stone flagged roof and weatherboarding in the gables. There are two storeys, and three bays separated by pilasters. Above the central doorway is a large Art Nouveau panel including a thrusting keystone and carvings of trees, and on the upper floor are three small windows. The outer bays have a five-light mullioned and transomed window with a segmental head in each floor. On the roof are three gabled dormers, and at the rear is a two-storey canted bay window with a parapet.	II
National Westminster Bank, Mumps; 53.54298°N 2.10272°W		1902–03	Built by the District Bank, it is in ashlar stone, on a polished granite plinth, with a rusticated ground floor and a Welsh slate roof. It is on a corner site, in baroque style, with two storeys, a front of seven bays and a tower over the entrance on the corner surmounted by a dome. The bays of the main range are divided by engaged Corinthian columns on corbels, and at the top is a modillion cornice and a balustraded parapet with segmental parapets at the ends.	II
Statue of Robert Ascroft; 53.53420°N 2.10280°W		1903	The statue in Alexandra Park commemorates Robert Ascroft a local Member of Parliament, and is by F. W. Pomeroy. It consists of a stepped and moulded granite plinth with a cornice. On this is the standing figure of Robert Ascroft in bronze. On the plinth is an inscription.	II
Former Board School; 53.55287°N 2.10385°W		c. 1905	The school, later used for other purposes, is in brick with dressings in stone and terracotta and a Welsh slate roof. It has two storeys with attics, a front of twelve bays, and two parallel rear wings. Its features include gables of various shapes with pinnacles, cupolas, octagonal pilasters on the upper floor, and decorative friezes.	II
Moravian Sunday School; 53.54346°N 2.13180°W		1906	The building is in Edwardian Baroque style, and is built in brick with white terracotta dressings and a hipped Welsh slate roof. It has two storeys and three bays. The central bay is recessed and has a doorway with banded Ionic pilasters flanked by oval windows. Above it is a moulded frieze with an inscription and a cornice, and at the top is a lunette window with voussoirs and a cornice. The outer bays form towers with square windows on the lower floor and a cartouche above.	II
Offices of Dronsfield and Company; 53.53716°N 2.11616°W	—	1906–1908	The office building has a lower storey of polished granite, green glazed brick in the upper part, and a flat concrete roof. There are two storeys, a symmetrical front with a central entrance tower flanked by three bays on each side. Above the doorway is a round-arched window and a recessed tower. The outer bays contain a 16-pane window with an iron frame on each floor, those on the upper floor in shallow concave panelled granite architraves.	II
Conservatory, Alexandra Park; 53.53207°N 2.10387°W		1907	The conservatory is in timber and glass on a brick plinth. There are three pavilions, the central one being the largest. This has a rectangular plan and a hipped roof, on which is a central lantern with a domed top, and weathervanes with brattishing at the ends. The other pavilions have square plans, and flank the central pavilion forming a symmetrical structure.	II
Hartford Mill; 53.53744°N 2.13560°W		1907	A former steam-powered cotton spinning mill by F. W. Dixon, it is in brick with an interior of cast iron and steel. On a sloping site, it has four and five storeys, and sides of 25 and twelve bays. The tower is in the northwest corner, it is in Baroque style and two storeys taller than the main block, and there is a stair tower in the centre of the north side. There is a single-storey extension to the south, the engine house at the southwest has three storeys and five bays, on the west is a rope race, the boiler house is detached to the west, and the chimney to the south of the engine house.	II
Devon Mill; 53.52304°N 2.13451°W		1908	A former steam-powered cotton spinning mill by George Stott, it is in brick with an interior of cast iron and steel. There are four storeys and basements, sides of 36 and ten bays, and corner stair turrets with parapets. The mill has a stone band and corbelled eaves, and there is a taller tower at the southwest corner with an extra storey. To the northwest is an engine house, to the west is a rope race, and there is a detached chimney.	II
Waterhead War Memorial; 53.54933°N 2.07671°W	—	1920	The war memorial stands in a small triangular garden at a road junction. It is in sandstone, and consists of a narrow square platform, a square base, a plinth with a moulded foot and a square cap with a moulded cornice, and a tiered pedestal. On this is a bronze statue of a soldier in battledress with a bayonet in his right hand and his helmet held in his left hand. On the plinth are inscriptions relating to both World Wars.	II
Hollinwood War Memorial; 53.52452°N 2.13630°W	—	1922	The war memorial is near the west gable wall of St Margaret's Church. It is in granite and consists of a Latin cross on a tall square plinth on a two-stepped paved base. The centre of the cross is carved with "IHS" in relief, and on the plinth is an inscription. Attached to the wall of the church behind the cross are two panels inscribed with the names of those lost in the two World Wars.	II
Oldham War Memorial; 53.54223°N 2.11121°W		1923	The war memorial was designed by Thomas Taylor and the sculpture is by Albert Toft. It has a shallow stepped base and a large rectangular granite pedestal with coffered bronze doors and decorative motifs, On the pedestal is a bronze statue depicting a trench scene from the First World War including five soldiers. Also included in the listing are the memorial wall, piers, the gates and steps to St Mary's churchyard, the forecourt walls, steps and balustrade on the south side, and the railings to the west side of St Mary's churchyard.	II*
Church of St Mathew and St Aidan; 53.53591°N 2.08873°W	—	1932–33	The church is in red brick on a plinth of darker brick, with stone dressings and a Welsh slate roof, and is in Neoclassical style. It consists of a nave and a chancel with flanking vestries. At the west end is a portico with a rusticated architrave in Portland stone. The windows are round-headed with keystones and oculi. The west gable is pedimented, and on it is a cupola with Tuscan shafts and a timber lantern with a domed top.	II
Dame Sarah Lees Memorial; 53.53198°N 2.12973°W	—	c. 1938	The monument in Werneth Park commemorates Sarah Lees, a local politician and philanthropist. It is in stone and consists of a tall pylon on a hexagonal plinth on a circular base, standing in a circular garden surrounded by a wall containing four drinking fountains. On the circular base and on the plinth are low relief bronzes, including a bust of Sarah Lees and Art Deco motifs.	II
Church of The Holy Rosary, Fitton Hill; 53.52085°N 2.10690°W		1954–55	The church is built in buff brick with a concrete tile roof. It consists of a nave, a porch, a baptistry, a sanctuary, a Lady chapel, confessionals, and two sacristies. In the sanctuary is a mosaic by George Mayer-Marton of Christ on the Cross in a combination of Neo-Byzantine mosaic and modernist fresco, measuring about 7.5 metres (25 ft) tall and 5 metres (16 ft) wide.	II
115 Union Street; 53.54112°N 2.10851°W	—	Undated	A house, later a solicitor's office, in brick with a slate roof, two storeys and three bays. In the right bay is a round-headed doorway with a panelled architrave and consoles in low relief. The windows are sashes, and at the top of the building is a string course and a dentilled eaves cornice.	II
117 Union Street; 53.54115°N 2.10838°W	—	Undated	A house, later an office, in brick with a slate roof, two storeys and three bays, the outer bays projecting slightly forward. The central bay contains a round-headed doorway with an architrave, console brackets, and an entablature. The windows are sashes, and on the ground floor they have three lights. At the top of the building are a string course and moulded wooden eaves.	II
