= Oldham War Memorial =

Monument in Greater Manchester, England

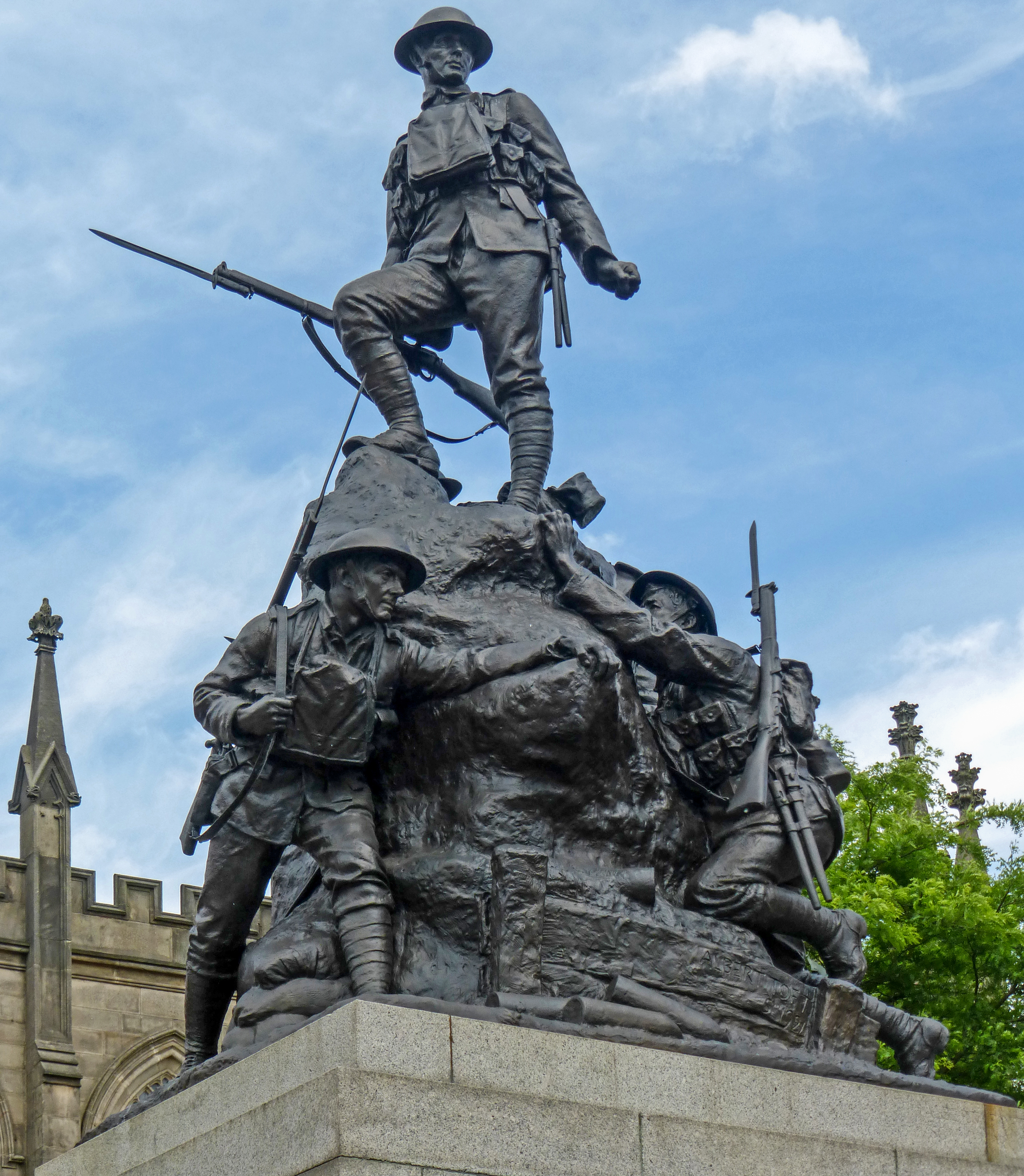
- Oldham War Memorial in 2014

- Location within Greater Manchester

General information
- Location: Church St, Oldham, Greater Manchester, England
- Coordinates: 53.54221°N 2.11123°W
- Year built: 1923

Technical details
- Material: Granite

Design and construction
- Architect: Thomas Taylor
- Architecture firm: Taylor and Simister
- Other designers: Albert Toft (sculptor)
- Main contractor: Thomas Taylor

Listed Building – Grade II*
- Official name: Oldham War Memorial, including memorial wall, piers, gates and steps to St Mary's churchyard and forecourt walls, steps and balustrade (south side), and railings to St Mary's Churchyard (west side)
- Designated: 23 January 1973
- Reference no.: 1210137

Oldham War Memorial is a war memorial in Oldham, Greater Manchester, England, comprising a large bronze sculpture group on a granite plinth. It was built to commemorate the men of Oldham who were killed in the First World War. Bronze plaques on the wall of the churchyard nearby list the fallen, including Mabel Drinkwater, a nurse who died after an operation at Oldham Royal Infirmary. A mechanised roll of honour was added in the 1950s, listing the men from Oldham who were killed in the Second World War. The memorial became a Grade II listed building in 1973 and was upgraded to Grade II* in December 2016.

== Background and location ==
After the end of the First World War, a campaign was started in 1919 to raise £20,000 to build a war memorial in Oldham, and to endow educational scholarships for the children who lost a father, with the intention that any excess funds would be paid to Oldham Royal Infirmary (the hospital closed in 1989, and merged with Royal Oldham Hospital, its site later becoming the home for Oldham Sixth Form College).

The memorial was commissioned in 1919 by the Oldham War Memorial Committee. It was designed and built by Thomas Taylor and the bronze sculpture was by Albert Toft.

The siting of the memorial proved controversial: the first proposed site in the Market Place, close to some public lavatories, was rejected, and a second site by St Mary's Church was considered to be too close to a public house, the Greaves Arms. Other sites in Alexandra Park or close to the library were considered, before the decision was made to erect the memorial near St Mary's Church, opposite the Old Town Hall.

== History ==
The memorial was unveiled by General Sir Ian Hamilton on 28 April 1923, before a crowd estimated at over 10,000, and dedicated by the Bishop of Manchester, William Temple.

It was designated as a Grade II listed building in 1973. It was cleaned and restored in 2012–13, and rededicated on 10 November 2013. In 2016 the memorial's listing was upgraded to II*.

== Memorial ==
The war memorial comprises a bronze group sculpture of five life-size soldiers in full battle dress and carrying their weapons, mounted on top of a 3-metre (9.8 ft) granite plinth. At a late stage, the sculpture group was rotated 180 degrees to face towards the town hall rather than the church.

The soldiers are depicted as if making their way along trenches: one of the figures stands on top of the memorial, as if having climbed out of the trenches, encouraging his comrades to advance. The same figure used at the Royal Fusiliers War Memorial in London, and the 41st Division memorial at Flers in France.

The plinth originally had a pair of bronze doors at either side, to the north and south, allowing access to a chamber inside housing the roll of honour of the 1st, 10th and 24th Battalions of the Manchester Regiment, and a space for private prayer. The south pair of doors was removed in the 1950s and replaced by a window through which a mechanised roll of honour of the fallen from the Second World War can be viewed.

An inscriptions over the south doors reads: "DEATH IS THE GATE OF LIFE / 1914–1918"; and one over the window on the south side reads: "TO GOD BE THE PRAISE".

== Gallery ==
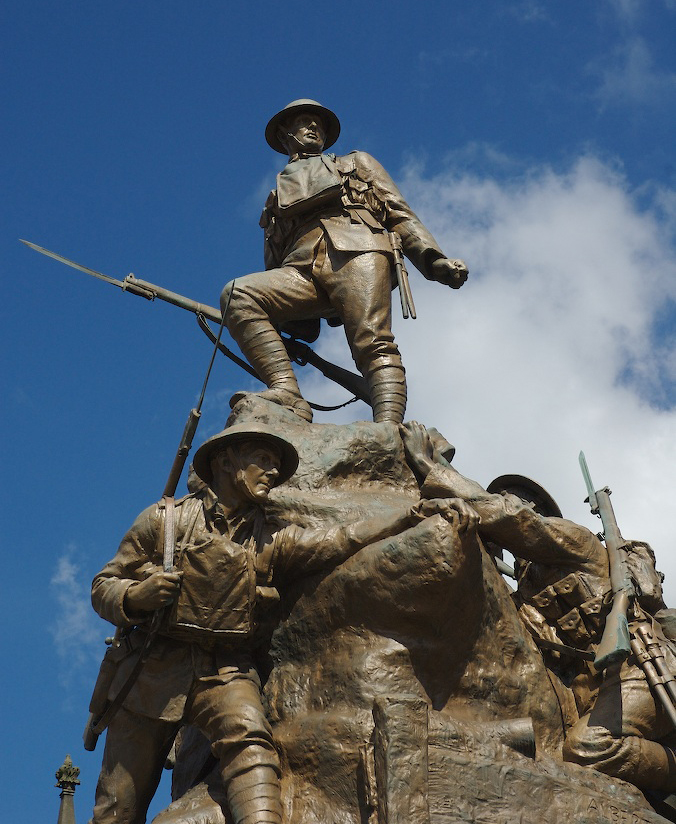
Detail of sculpture group, 2006

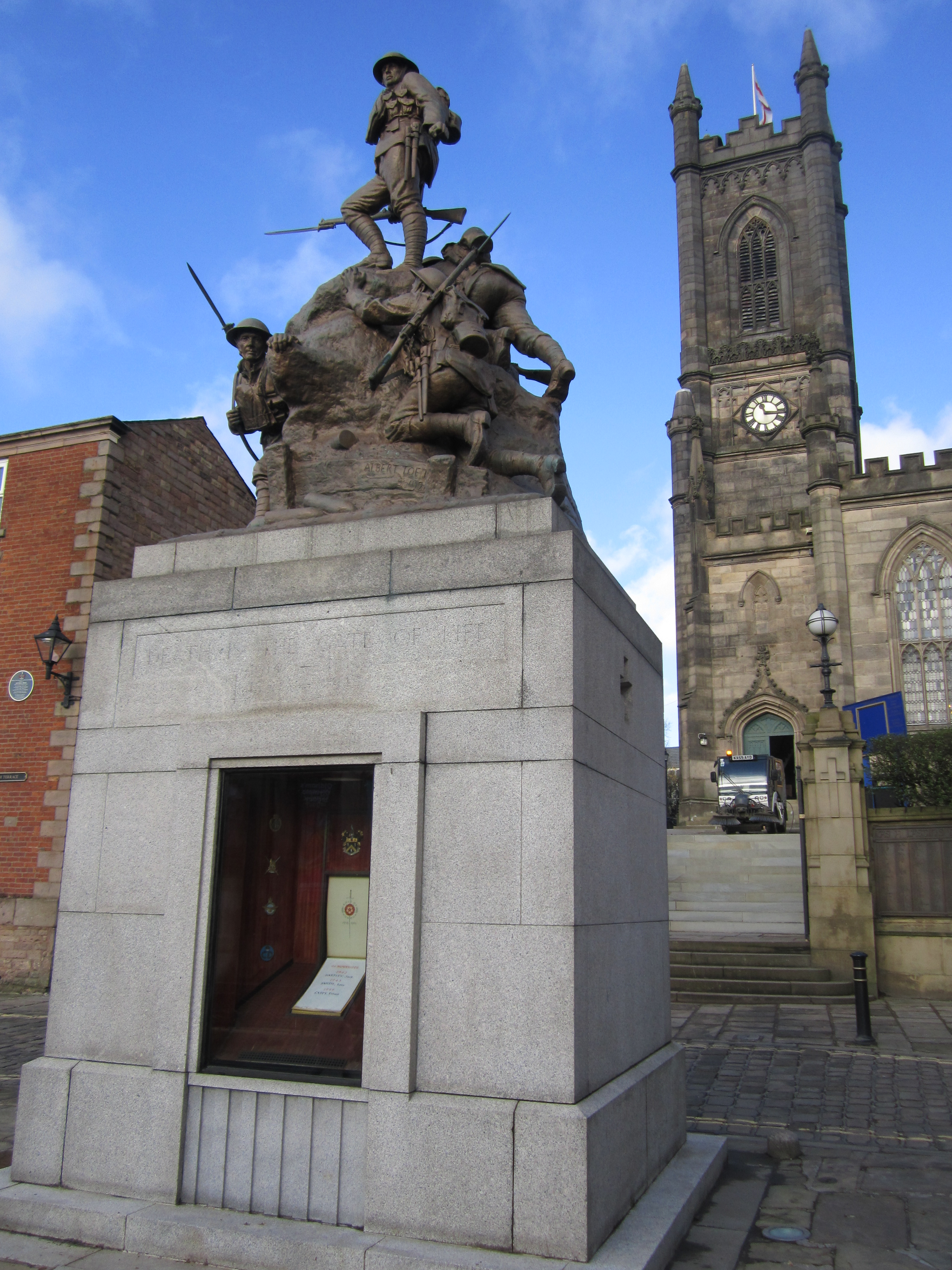
Oldham War Memorial, south side, 2012

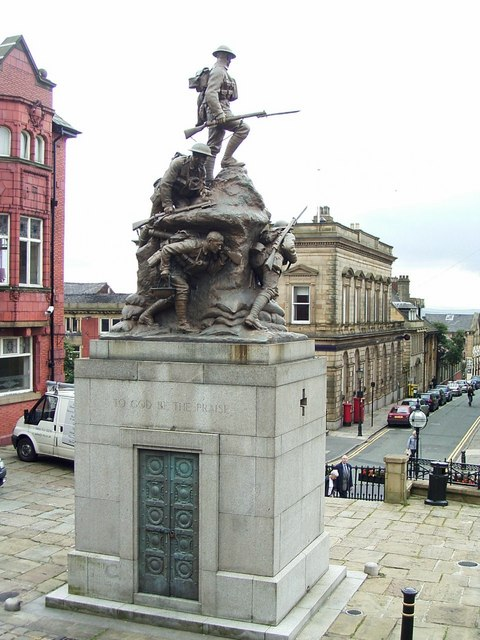
Oldham War Memorial, north side, 2007

== See also ==
- Grade II* listed buildings in Greater Manchester
- Grade II* listed war memorials in England
- Listed buildings in Oldham
