= Independent Methodist Chapel =

Listed building in Oldham, Greater Manchester, England

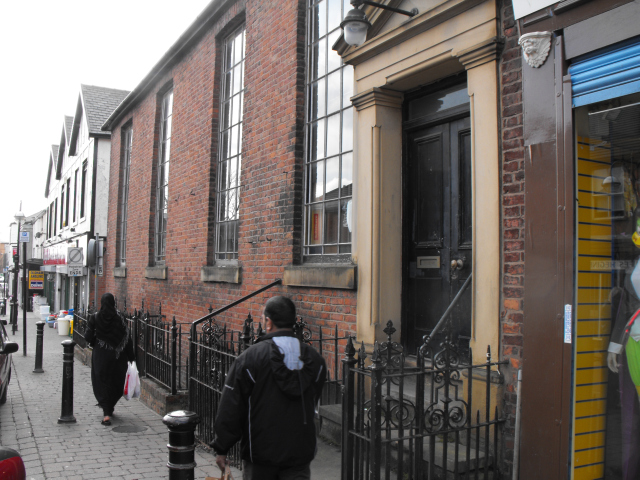
- The building in 2010

- Location within Greater Manchester
- Alternative names: George Street Chapel

General information
- Architectural style: Georgian
- Location: George Street, Oldham, Greater Manchester, England
- Coordinates: 53.5403°N 2.1162°W
- Year built: 1815; 211 years ago
- Renovated: 2013–14 (restored)

Website
- George St Chapel

Listed Building – Grade II*
- Official name: Independent Methodist Chapel
- Designated: 2 August 1983
- Reference no.: 1201672

The Independent Methodist Chapel, commonly known as George Street Chapel, is a historic former place of worship in Oldham, Greater Manchester, England. Built in 1815, it is considered one of the earliest chapels constructed specifically for the Independent Methodist movement. Today, the building is designated as a Grade II* listed structure and serves as a heritage and events venue operated by Age UK Oldham.

== History ==
The chapel was erected by its congregation during the formative years of Independent Methodism, a movement that emphasised lay leadership, simplicity in worship, and independence from the Wesleyan Methodist hierarchy. George Street Chapel was among the first five Independent Methodist chapels in the world and played a central role in the spiritual and social life of Oldham's working-class community.

Originally, the basement of the chapel contained four cellar dwellings, which provided social housing during times of hardship. The chapel also hosted a Sunday school from 1830 and became a hub for local education and social activities.

On 2 August 1983, the Independent Methodist Chapel was designated a Grade II* listed building.

The building remained in use for worship until 1990, after which it was sold to a developer. Following a failed redevelopment, the chapel was acquired by Age Concern Oldham (now Age UK Oldham) and restored between 2013 and 2014 with support from the Heritage Lottery Fund and other heritage organisations. It operates as a heritage and events space, hosting weddings, conferences, and educational visits. Age UK Oldham uses the venue to promote intergenerational projects and celebrate local history.

== Architecture ==
George Street Chapel is an example of Georgian architecture. Constructed in brick with a Welsh slate roof, the building features a four-window range with flat-arched brick heads and stained glass margin lights. The entrance is marked by paired panelled doors set within a stone pedimented architrave, complemented by cast-iron railings and gates.

=== Interior ===
Internally, the chapel retains its original box pews, galleries on three sides supported by cast-iron columns, and a tiered seating arrangement around the rostrum. A queen post roof spans the structure, and the basement rooms include fireplaces with simple stone surrounds.

A pipe organ was installed in the chapel in 1890 by J. P. Croft of Manchester, organ builders associated with George Benson. It is believed the instrument may have been purchased second-hand. The adjoining Sunday school, constructed in 1830, was equipped with pianos and a harmonium. Most of the chapel's musical instruments were sold in 1892.

A photograph from the first Harvest Festival in 1899 depicts the original decorative scheme of the interior. This decoration was later painted over but was revealed again during restoration works carried out in 2013.

== See also ==
- Grade II* listed buildings in Greater Manchester
- Listed buildings in Oldham
