= Royal Fusiliers War Memorial =

War memorial in Holborn, London

Coordinates: 51.51811°N 0.11083°W

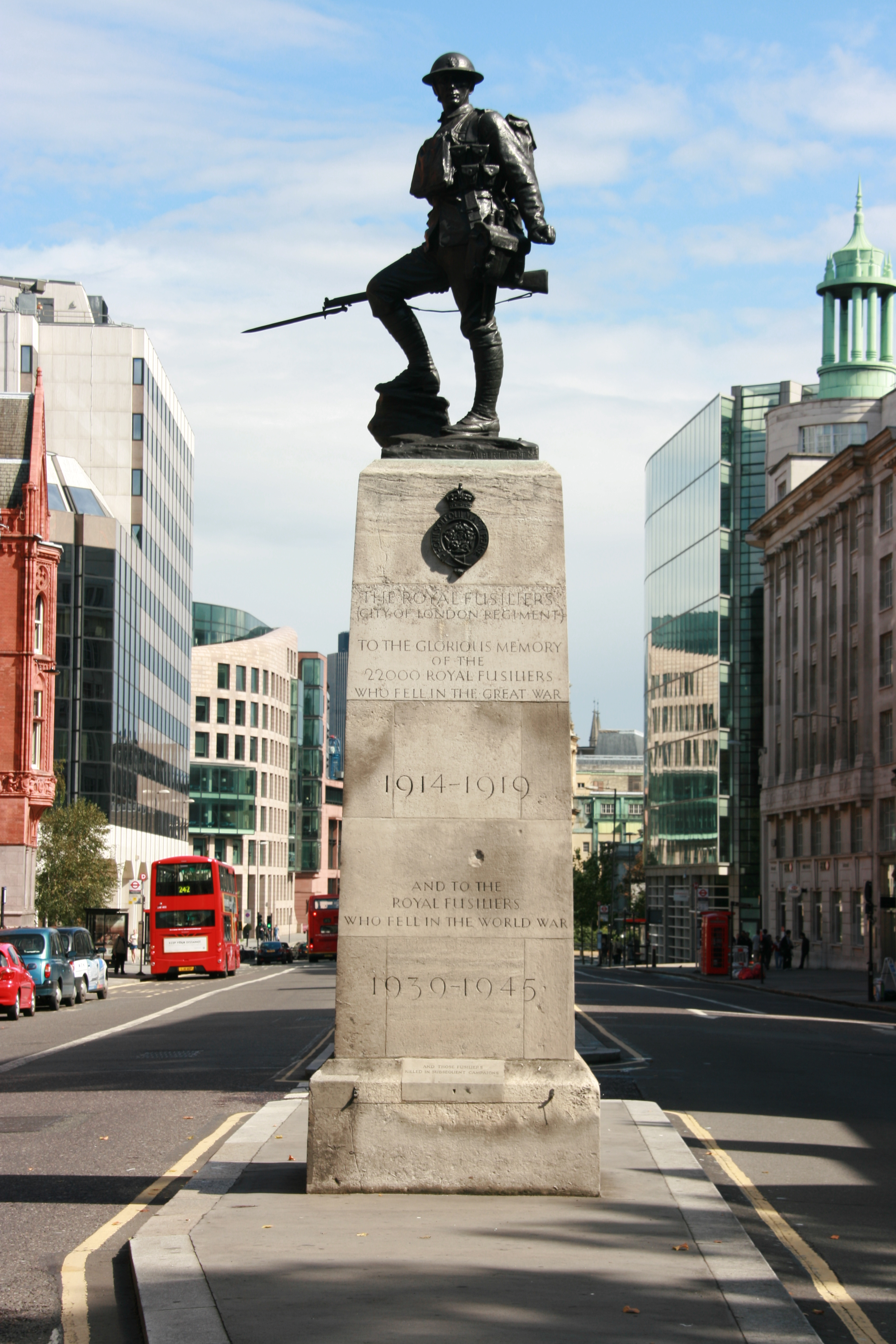
Royal Fusiliers War Memorial on High Holborn

The Royal Fusiliers War Memorial is a memorial in London, dedicated to the members of the Royal Fusiliers killed in the World Wars, Russian Civil War and subsequent conflicts, along with members of a number of London Regiment battalions killed in the First World War. It consists of a bronze statue on a 16.5 feet (5.0 m) pedestal made of Portland stone.

It was erected in 1922 at Holborn Bar, one of the ancient entry points to the City of London, on a traffic island in the middle of High Holborn, on the City's boundary with the London Borough of Camden, denoted by a dragon boundary mark on either side of the street. The site is near High Holborn's junction with Gray's Inn Road, and is close to the historic Staple Inn.

== History ==
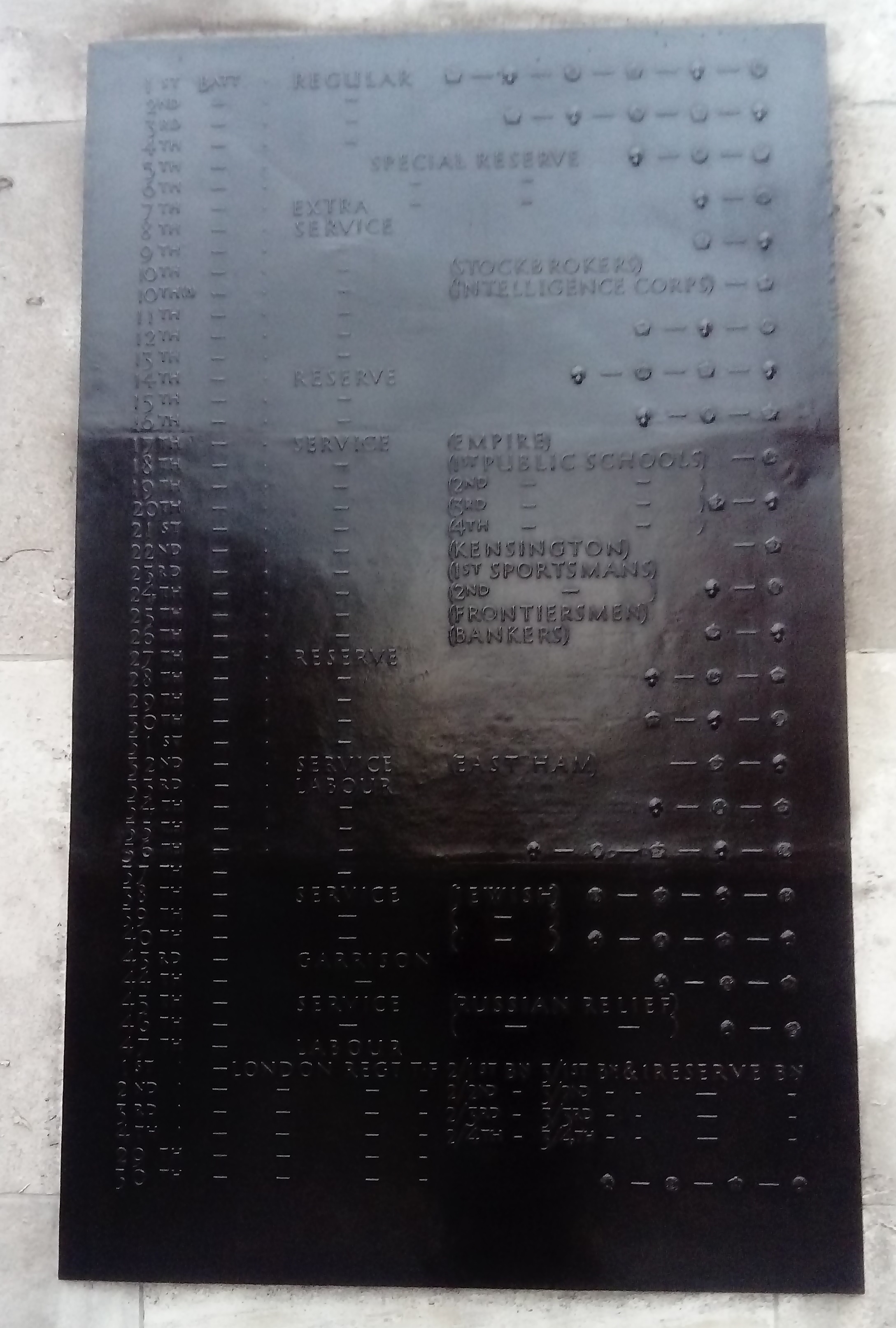
The inscription on the reverse of the memorial

An original intention to erect a memorial to the Royal London Fusiliers in a Royal Park shifted to Hounslow Barracks and then Holborn. A subscription list opened in 1919 and raised £3,000 by August 1920. The monument was unveiled by the Lord Mayor of London on 4 November 1922. The church of St Sepulchre-without-Newgate, about 450 yards (410 m) east of the memorial, was selected as the regimental chapel in 1946. The memorial became a Grade II listed structure in 1972, upgraded to Grade II* in July 2017.

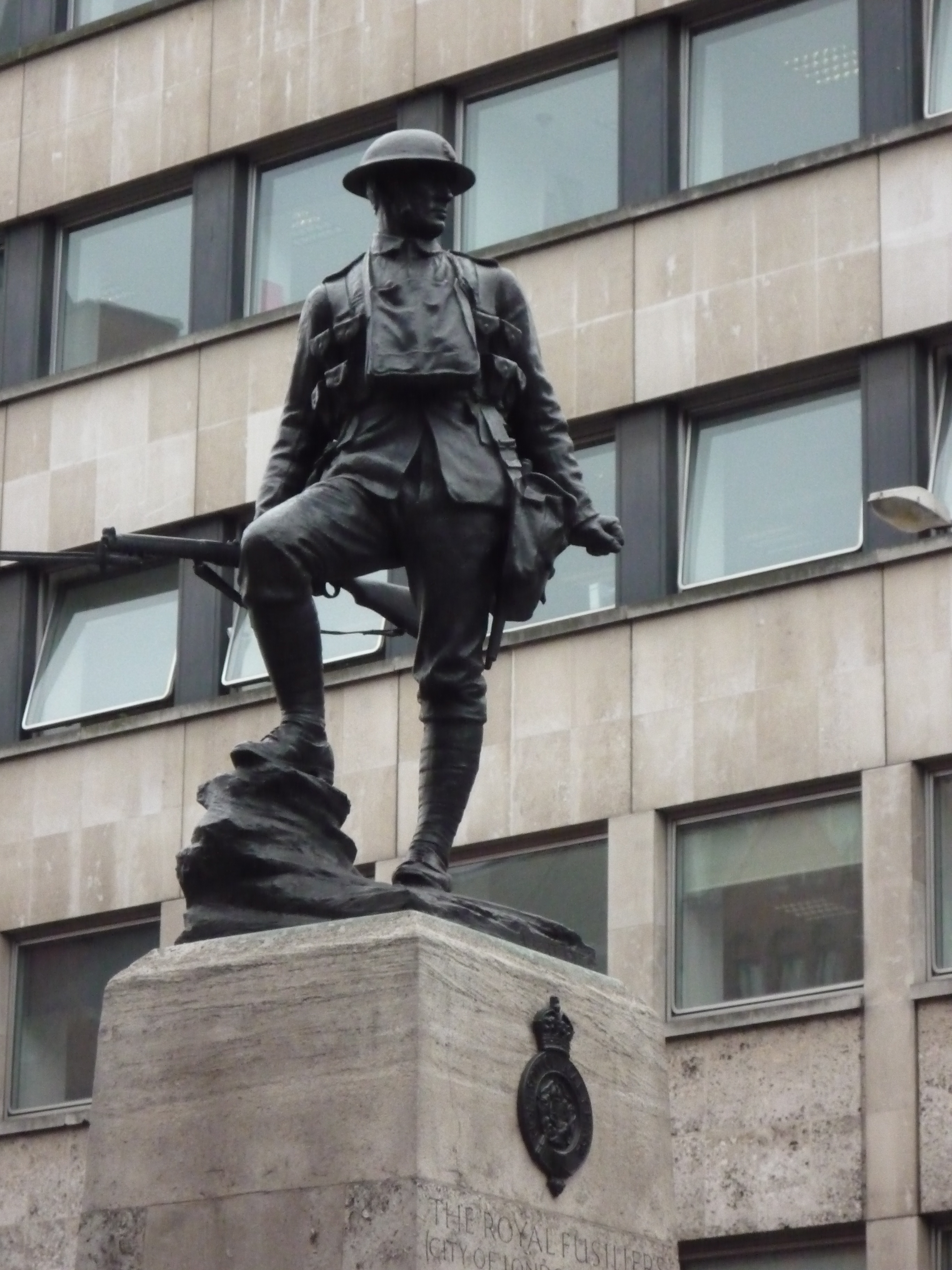
The statue

== Inscriptions ==
The main inscription is on the west-facing front of the pedestal below a bronze relief of the Tudor Rose from the regimental badge and states the memorial's dedication to the almost 22,000 soldiers of Royal Fusiliers who died during the First World War and Russian Civil War, with later additions commemorating the Royal Fusiliers who died during the Second World War and in subsequent conflicts. A bronze plaque on the pedestal's east-facing reverse lists 47 regular, Territorial, service, reserve, special reserve, extra, garrison and labour battalions of the Royal Fusiliers which served between 1914 and 1919, along with a number of London Regiment battalions whose predecessors had been attached to the Royal Fusiliers prior to 1908. (Note: 1/1st, 2/1st, 3/1st, 1st Reserve, 1/2nd, 2/2nd, 3/2nd, 1/3rd, 2/3rd, 3/3rd, 4th, 2/4th, 3/4th, 29th and 30th Battalions)

== Statue ==
The 8.5 feet (2.6 m) high bronze statue was designed by Albert Toft and cast by A.B. Burton at the Thames Ditton Foundry, with Cheadle and Harding as architects. It is said to be modelled on a Sergeant Cox, who served throughout the First World War. It depicts a private soldier in service dress, carrying a rifle with fixed bayonet in his right hand, facing along the road to the west to guard the entrance to the City of London. An identical statue is one of five bronze figures by Toft forming a sculpture group for Oldham War Memorial, unveiled in 1923. The same single bronze figure was unveiled in 1932 as the memorial to the 41st Division at Flers, near the site of the Battle of Flers-Courcelette, where tanks were used in battle for the first time on 15 September 1916.

== See also ==
- List of public art in the City of London
- Grade II* listed war memorials in England
