= Alfonso Toft =

British landscape artist

Alfonso Toft (Birmingham 1866–1964), was a British landscape artist. He was the son of Charles Toft (1832–1901) and was born in the Birmingham suburb of Handsworth. He came from a family of Staffordshire pottery artists. His father was a principal modeller for Wedgwood pottery from 1876–88 and also an artist. His brother was the sculptor Albert Toft.

He was a member of the Royal Institute of Oil Painters.

In 1910, 1912 and 1914 he was one of the artists who represented Britain at the Venice Biennale He also designed the medal for the coronation of George V.

== Collections ==
- The National Museum of Wales, Cardiff
- Birmingham Museum & Art Gallery
- The Potteries Museum & Art Gallery, Staffordshire
- Newcastle-under-Lyme Borough Museum & Art Gallery
- Hull University
- Wolverhampton Art Gallery
- Royal Collection
