= Royal Oak, Oldham =

Listed former pub in Greater Manchester, England

Royal Oak
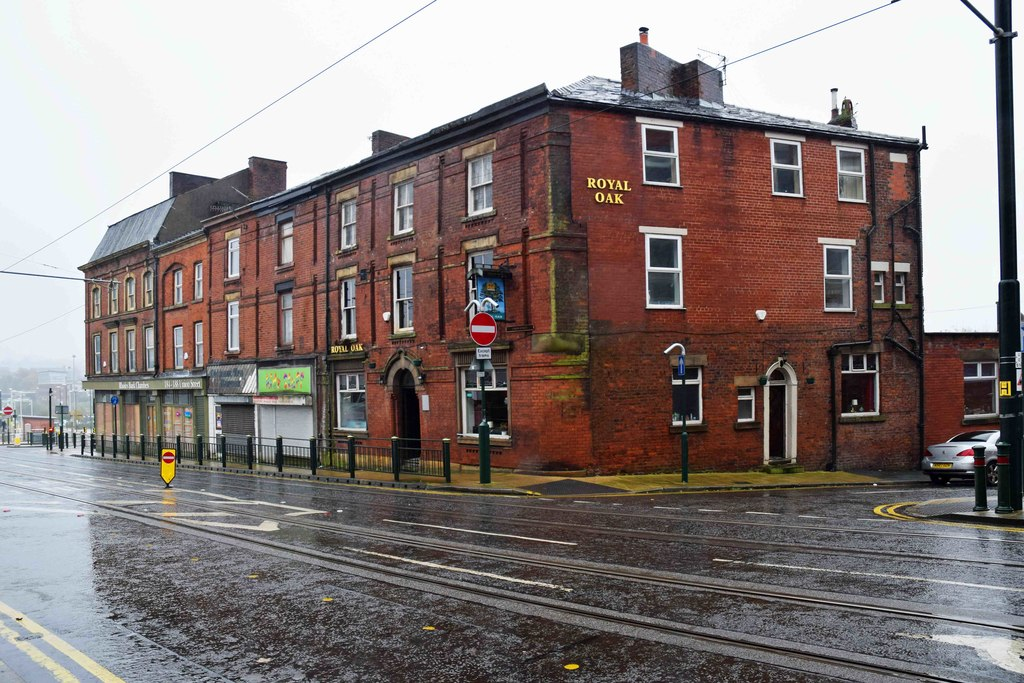
- The pub in 2017

- Location within Greater Manchester
- Alternative names: Royal Oak Hotel

General information
- Status: Vacant
- Type: Public house (former)
- Location: 178 Union Street, Oldham, Greater Manchester, England
- Coordinates: 53.5418°N 2.1051°W
- Year built: Early to mid-19th century
- Renovated: 1872 (extended, re-fronted); 1928–29 (interior refitted)
- Closed: 2023

Design and construction
- Designations

Listed Building – Grade II
- Official name: The Royal Oak public house
- Designated: 7 March 2018
- Reference no.: 1451862

The Royal Oak is a Grade II listed former public house on Union Street in Oldham, Greater Manchester, England. Built in the early to mid‑19th century, it was extended and given a new frontage in 1872, and internally remodelled in 1928–29. It is regarded by the Campaign for Real Ale (CAMRA) as having an interior of "outstanding national historic importance". In 2023 it was closed by its owners and sold, and in 2024 it was designated an asset of community value. Its future as of October 2026 is uncertain.

== History ==
The Royal Oak was constructed in the early to mid-19th century, according to its official listing. (Note: Another source gives an opening date of 1825.) It was extended and re‑fronted in 1872, work that also altered the street fronts of the two single‑storey buildings to the left, which are not part of the listing. The 1922 and 1934 Ordnance Survey maps mark the building as a public house, although no name is shown.

In 1928–29 the architectural practice Taylor Roberts and Bowman was commissioned to design a new interior for the pub. The Royal Oak is regarded by the Campaign for Real Ale (CAMRA) as having an interior of "outstanding national historic importance" and is rated three stars in its grading scheme.

On 7 March 2018, the Royal Oak was designated a Grade II listed building. In November 2023, Inglenook Inns closed the pub and subsequently sold it, with the new owners not publicly identified. Internal damage has been noted, including flooding linked to the removal of a dishwasher. As a Grade II listed building, any internal alterations require listed building consent. In 2024 a local campaign group secured asset of community value status for the Royal Oak from Oldham Council, giving the community the opportunity to bid for the building if it is placed on the market. As of October 2026, no publicly available information has been released regarding the pub's current condition or future use.

== Architecture ==
=== Exterior ===
The building uses two shades of brick, with darker red hand‑made bricks alongside orange machine‑made ones, and has stone detailing and a slate roof. It stands at the corner where Union Street meets Rhodes Bank, forming the right‑hand end of a short terrace. The pub occupies three storeys with a partial cellar and presents a shared frontage with the two neighbouring properties to its left.

Its main front has orange brickwork with a stone base and a roof that slopes down on the outer side. The ground floor is arranged around a central arched entrance with a prominent stone surround, flanked by wide windows that include decorative glass, including the pub's name and small stained‑glass scenes. The upper floors have evenly spaced windows set between shallow projections in the brickwork, with simple stone sills and lintels and a modest timber band beneath the eaves. The corner at street level is rounded, with the upper corner angled above it.

The side facing Rhodes Bank shows a mix of older and later brickwork, with a secondary arched doorway, a mixture of window types, and some later replacements on the upper floors. The rear is mostly built of the darker bricks, with scattered sash windows and a stair window containing patterned stained glass. A single‑storey flat‑roofed addition housing service areas is excluded from the listing.

=== Interior ===
The interior retains many fixtures and fittings from the late 1920s, particularly around the main servery, which is a tall, curved structure in the lounge hall. It is made of dark timber with shaped detailing, etched‑glass service screens and hatches connecting to adjoining rooms, including the former off‑sales. Timber partitions, tiled finishes, original doors, fireplaces and the main staircase remain in place. Pink and green wall tiles with patterned bands appear in several areas, including the entrance lobby, the lounge hall and the stairwell, and the lounge hall has fixed seating along the west and south‑west sides.

The entrance from Union Street leads into a small lobby with stained‑glass glazing above the inner doors. A doorway from the lobby opens into the vault, which contains fixed seating, a draught screen and a small fireplace with a timber surround. A former lavatory, now unused, retains its tiled finishes and quarry‑tile floor. The two rooms on the left have been combined, with seating in the front section and a rear window matching those on the main façade, including etched and stained glass.

The staircase changes in form at the half‑landing, where a stained‑glass window lights the return flight. On the first floor, original doors with small leaded panes and timber surrounds remain. The function room has a moulded cornice, timber detailing and two fireplaces, and there is a smaller servery on this floor. The first‑floor lavatory retains its timber partitions and panelled doors.

== See also ==
- Listed buildings in Oldham
- Listed pubs in Greater Manchester
