= Royal Institute of Oil Painters =

Association of Painters

The Royal Institute of Oil Painters, also known as ROI, is an association of painters in London, England, and is the only major art society which features work done only in oil. It is a member society of the Federation of British Artists.

== History ==
The Royal Institute of Oil Painters was founded in 1882, and was granted royal status by King Edward VII in 1909. Its membership is restricted to about 65 members, who are elected into the society by existing members. Its annual exhibitions are open to general submission, and artists who have shown sufficient merit are initially elected as associates for up to five years, during which time they may be elected to full membership.

Historic artists who have shown with the society include Lawrence Alma-Tadema, Walter Sickert, Walter Goodman, Dame Laura Knight, Henri Fantin-Latour, John Collier, Alfonso Toft and Auguste Rodin.

It is one of the 9 member societies that form the Federation of British Artists and holds its meetings in the Federation's Mall Galleries, next to Trafalgar Square.

President Adebanji Alade (appointed 2023) Past Presidents include Ian Cryer, Michael Noakes (1972–78) and Olwen Tarrant.

Its records 1882–1997 are in the Victoria and Albert Museum.

== See also ==
- Federation of British Artists
