= South African War Memorial =

South African War Memorial or Boer War Memorial, may refer to:

== Australia ==
- Anning Monument, Tingalpa, Brisbane, Queensland
- Boer War Memorial, Allora, Toowoomba Region, Queensland
- Boer War Memorial, Gatton, Lockyer Valley Region, Queensland
- Boer War Veterans Memorial Kiosk and Lissner Park, Charters Towers, Queensland
- Coronation Lamp War Memorial, Mount Morgan, Rockhampton Region, Queensland
- South African War Memorial, Brisbane, Queensland
- South African War Memorial (South Australia)

== Canada ==
- South African War Memorial (Halifax)
- South African War Memorial (Toronto)
- Boer War Memorial (Montreal)
- South African War Memorial (Ottawa), see Canadian war memorials

== Ireland ==
- Fusiliers' Arch, Dublin

== South Africa ==
- Anglo-Boer War Memorial (Johannesburg)

== United Kingdom ==
- South African War Memorial, Cardiff
- Boer War Memorial, Crewe, also known as the South African War Memorial
- South African War Memorial, Richmond Cemetery, London
- The Last Shot/South African War Memorial, Manchester - see List of public art in Greater Manchester
- Boer War Memorial, Winsford, Cheshire
- Second Boer War Memorial, York

== See also ==
- Boer War (disambiguation)
