= South African War Memorial, Cardiff =

War memorial in Cardiff, Wales

Coordinates: 51.4845°N 3.1791°W

South African War Memorial
- Boer War Memorial
- Cardiff Council
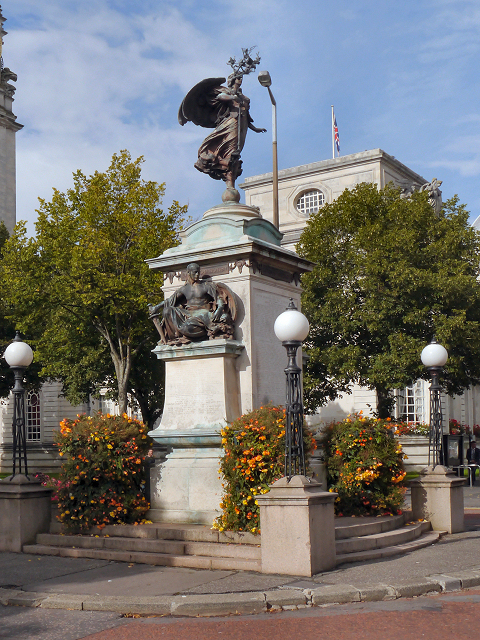
- For Welsh soldiers who fought in the Second Boer War
- Established: 1908
- Unveiled: 20 November 1909
- Location: near Cardiff Crown Court and City Hall, Cardiff
- Designed by: Albert Toft
- TO THE MEMORY; OF THE WELSHMEN WHO FELL IN SOUTH AFRICA; 1899–1902; ERECTED BY PUBLIC SUBSCRIPTION; Then a list of 817 names with the rank, regiment, forename, manner of death and decorations.

Listed Building – Grade II*
- Official name: South African War Memorial
- Designated: 25 January 1966
- Reference no.: 13745 (Cadw)

The South African War Memorial, also known as the Boer War Memorial, is a war memorial in Cardiff, Wales. It was erected in 1908 and unveiled by General Sir John French on 20 November 1909 to honour the victims of the Second Boer War. It is a Grade II* listed structure.

== Design ==
The memorial was sculpted by the English sculptor, Albert Toft. It stands at the south end of Edward VII Avenue, between the Cardiff Crown Court and City Hall in Cathays Park and is the centre of a U bend in the cul-de-sac. It was moved to its present location in the 1970s.

Statues on the memorial

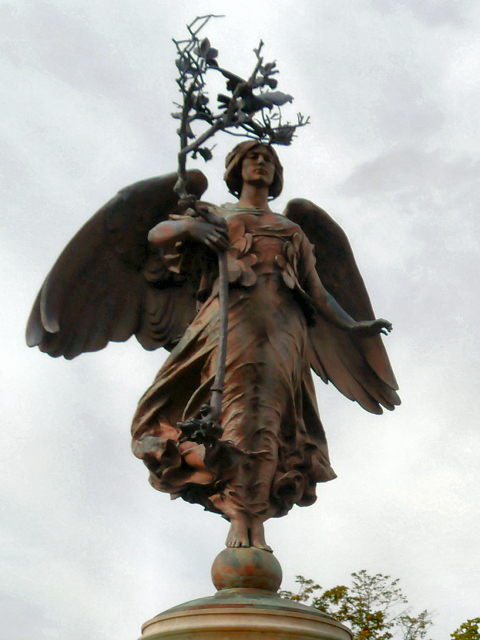
Peace

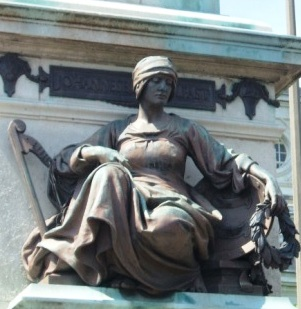
Grief

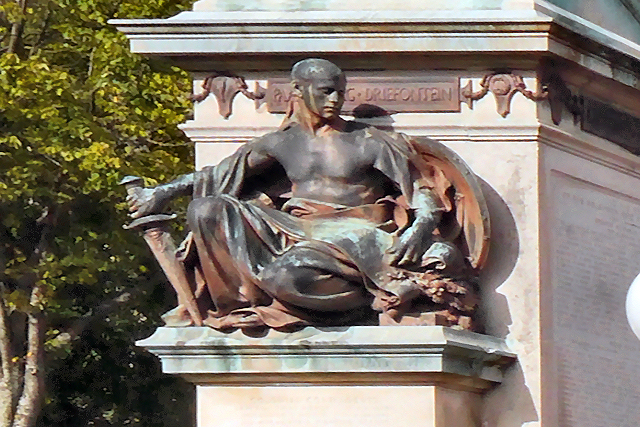
War and courage

The memorial consists of a bronze winged figure of peace holding an uprooted olive tree and standing on an orb, mounted on Portland Stone plinth with granite steps. On each corner stands metal lampstands with glass globe. It has two figures, a seated male figure (representing war and courage), on the western side (left of the main inscription), holding a sword & leaning on a shield. A seated female figure (representing grief) on the eastern side (right of the main inscription), holding a wreath and also leaning on a shield. The memorial is dedicated to "Welshmen" who served in a variety of units during the war.

=== Inscriptions ===
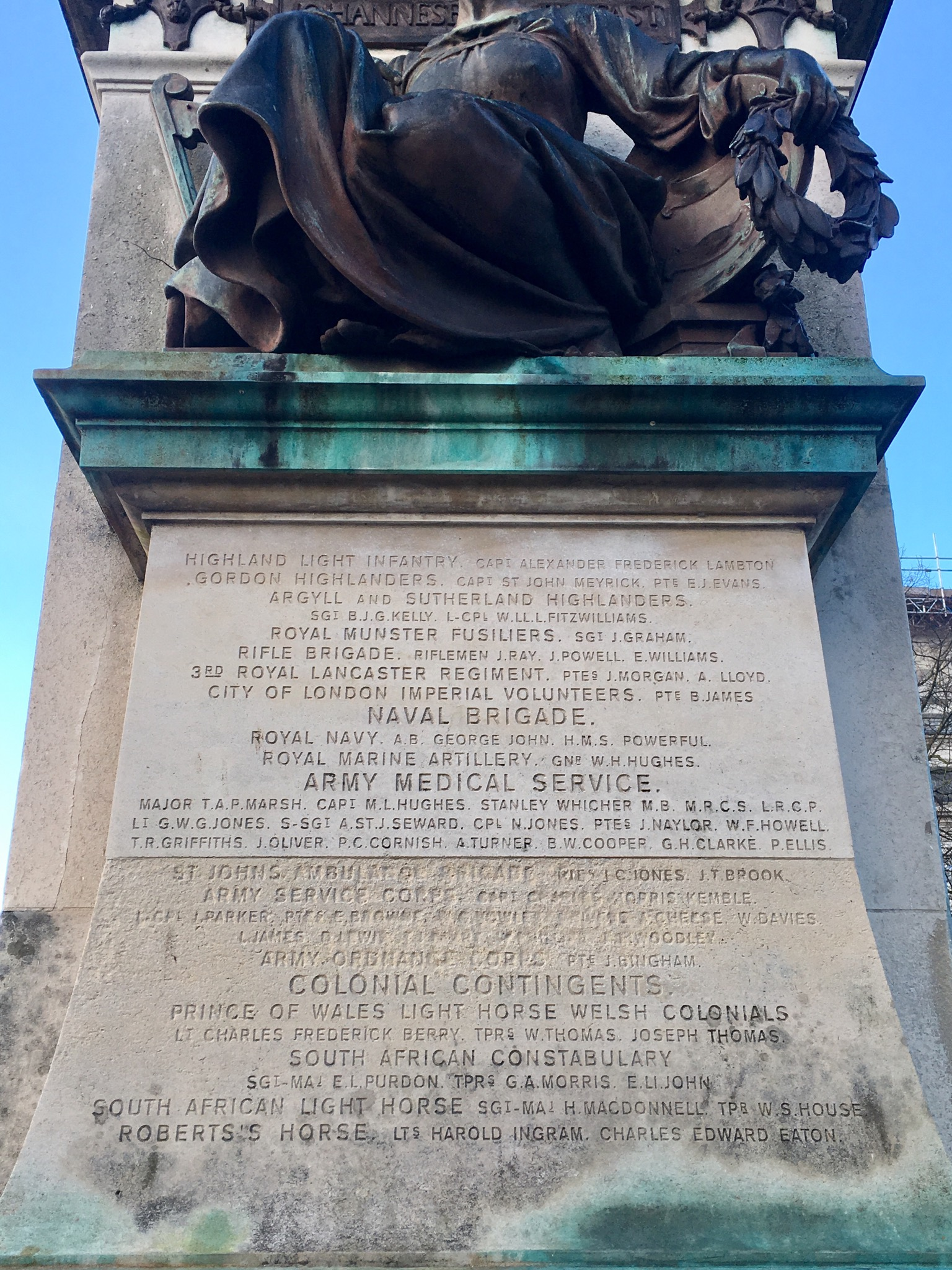
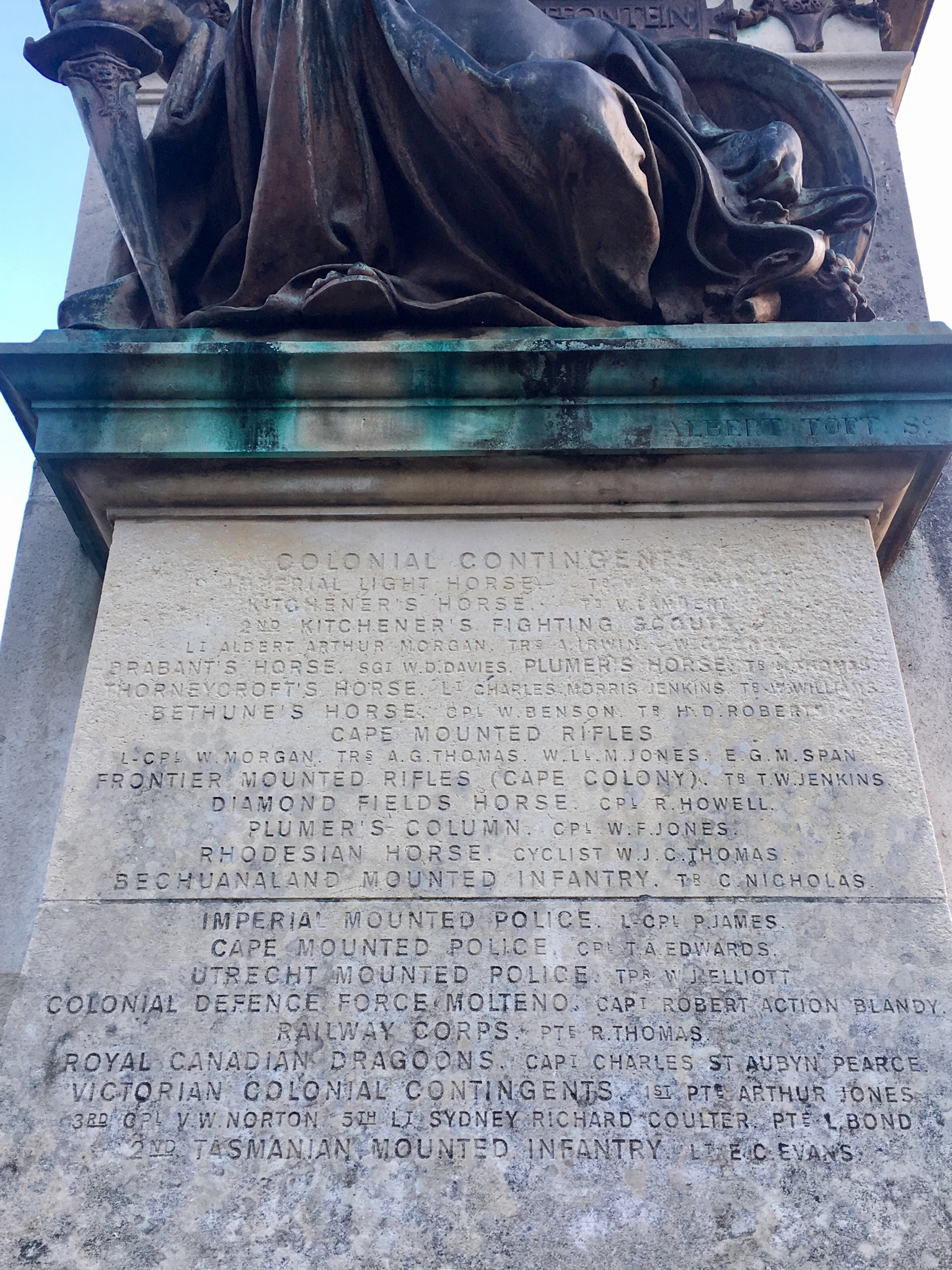
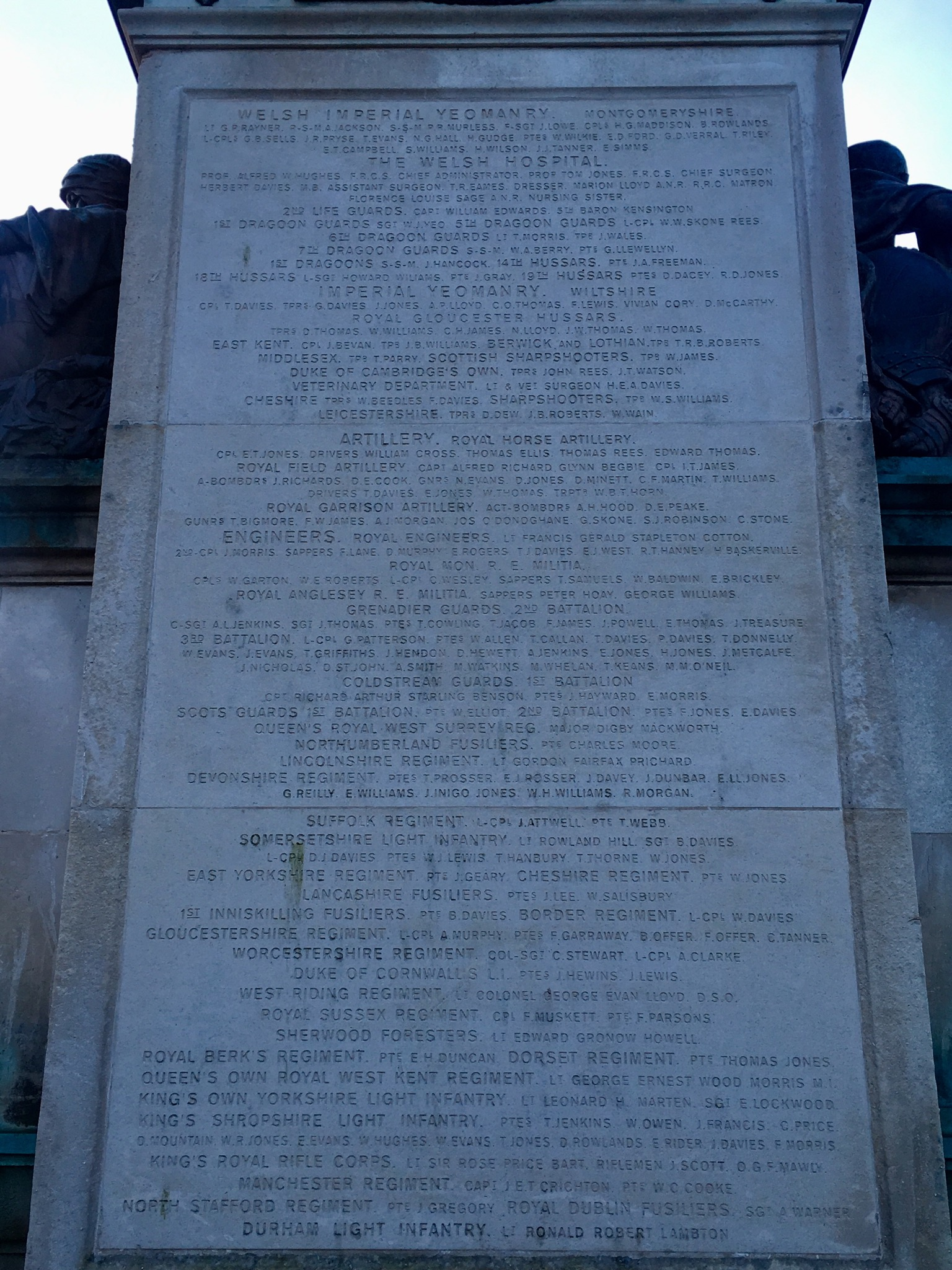
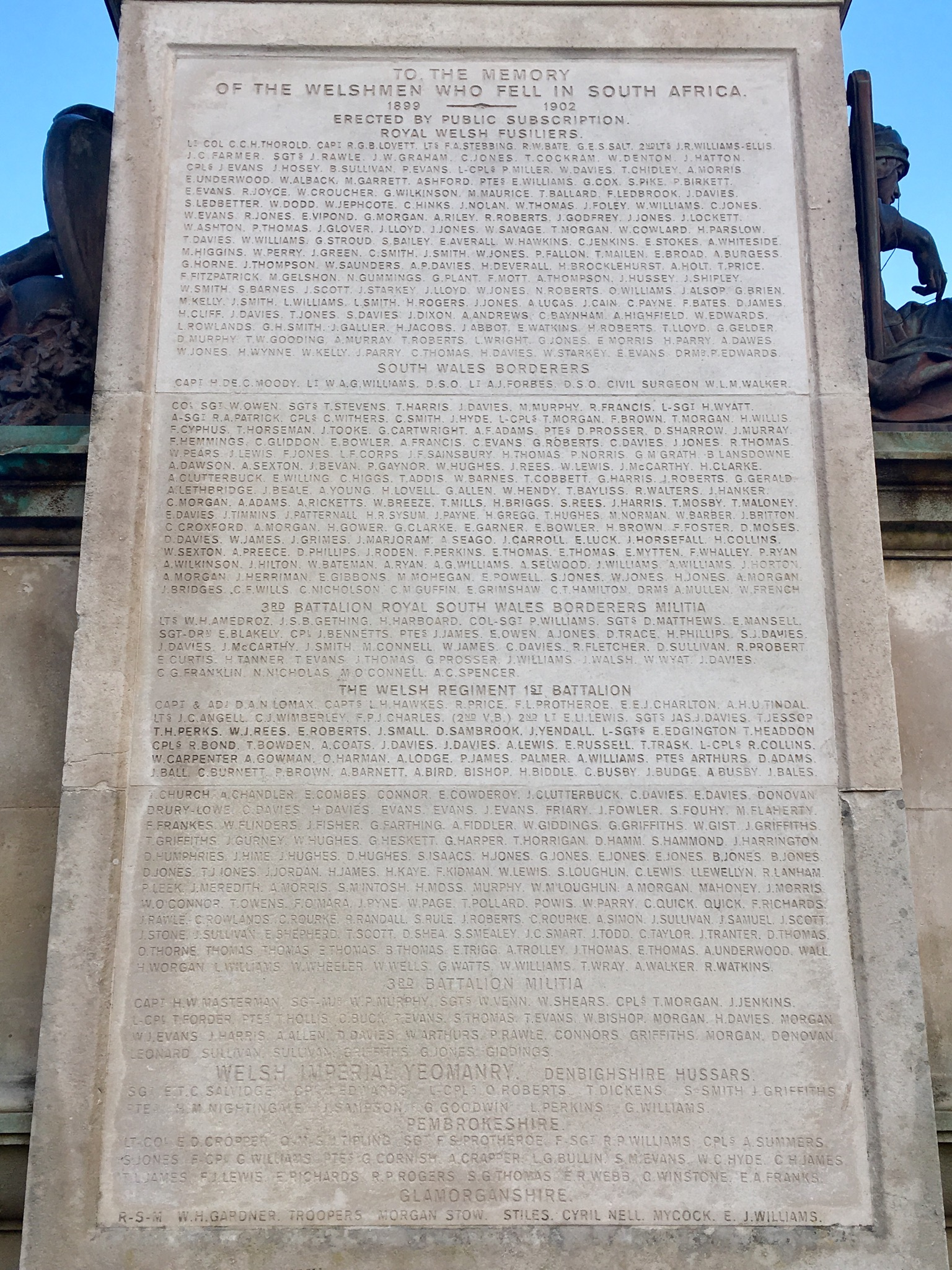

== See also ==
- Welsh National War Memorial
- South African War Memorial for other Boer War memorials
