= Chadderton Urban District =

Former local government area in the UK

Coordinates: 53°32′N 2°08′W

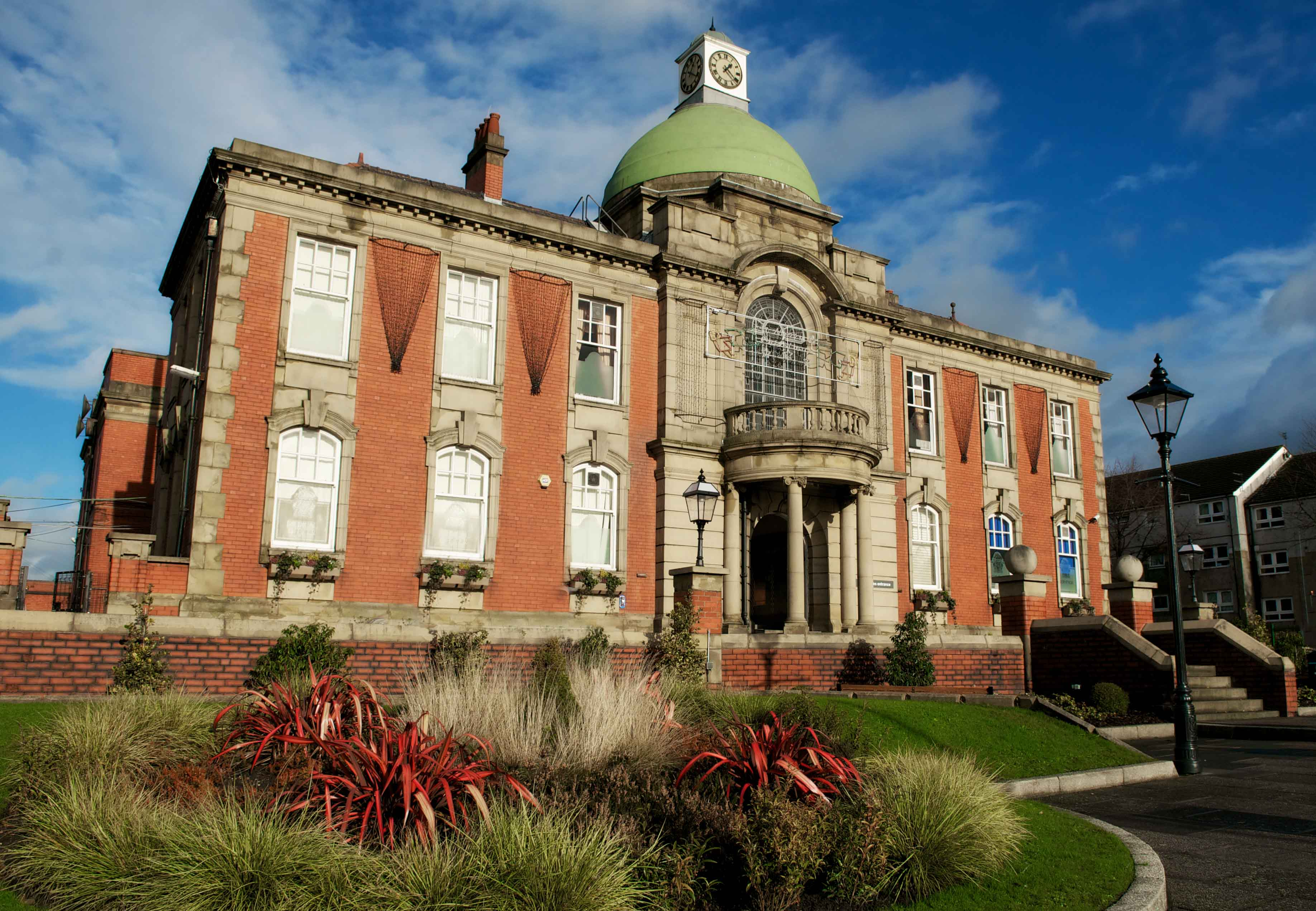
- Chadderton Town Hall
- Area
  - 1894: 3,082 acres (12.47 km^{2})
  - 1974: 3,014 acres (12.20 km^{2})
- Population
  - 1901: 24,892
  - 1971: 32,450
- History
  - Created: 1894
  - Abolished: 1974
  - Succeeded by: Metropolitan Borough of Oldham
- Status: Urban district
  - HQ: Chadderton Town Hall
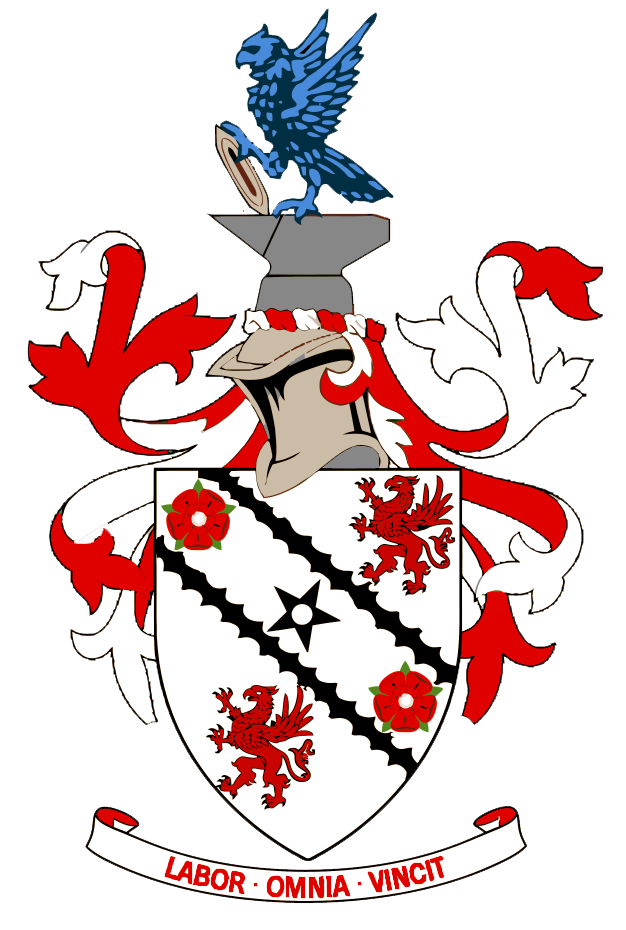

Chadderton Urban District was, from 1894 to 1974, a local government district of the administrative county of Lancashire, England. It was centred on the town of Chadderton.

It was created an urban district in 1894 by the Local Government Act 1894 and included the civil parish of Chadderton and part of the district of Hollinwood.

In 1974 Chadderton Urban District was abolished by the Local Government Act 1972 and its former area transferred to Greater Manchester to form part of the Metropolitan Borough of Oldham.
