= Chadderton Town Hall =

Municipal building in Greater Manchester, England

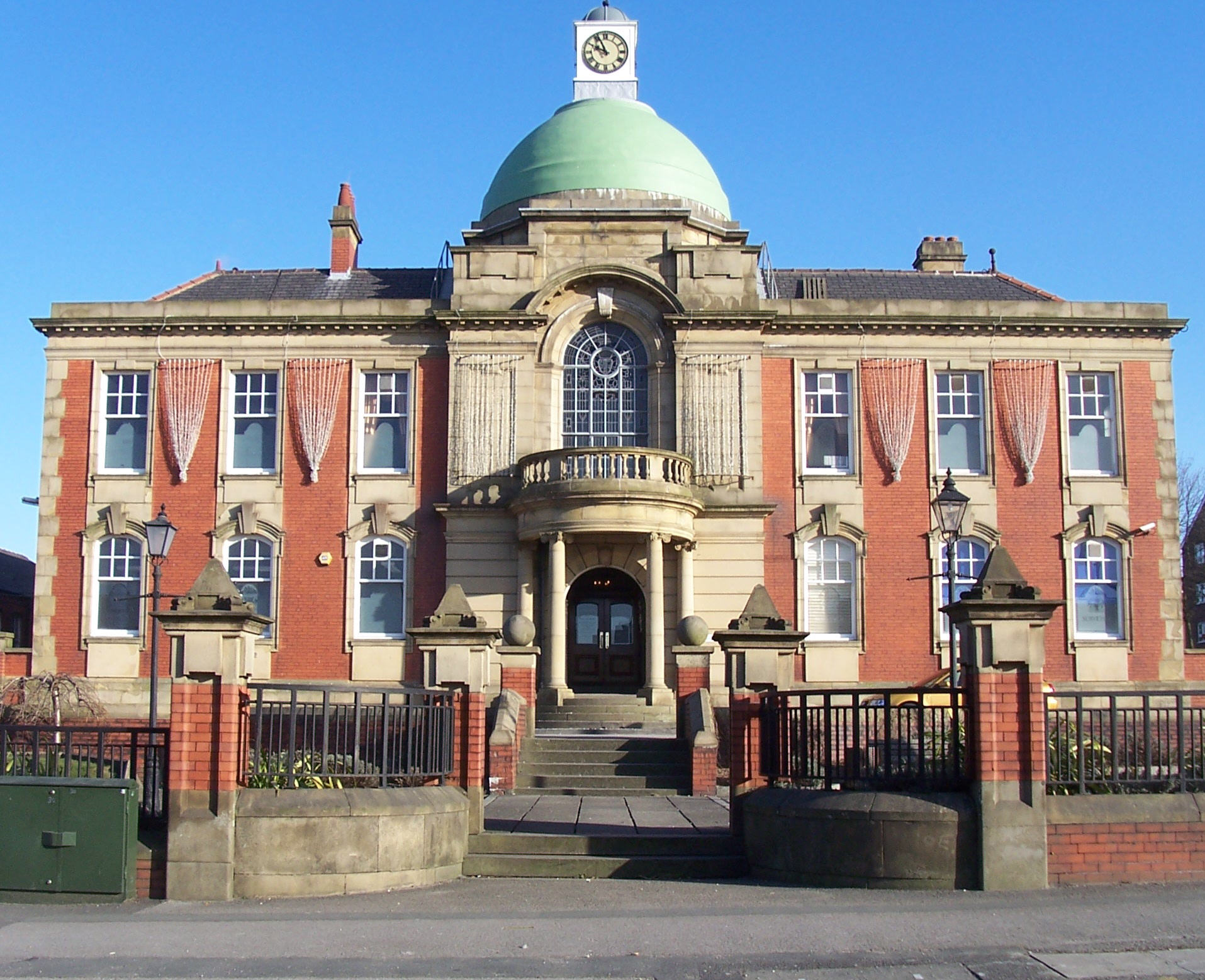
- Chadderton Town Hall

- Shown in Greater Manchester
- 53.5445°N 2.1374°W
- Location: Middleton Road, Chadderton

History
- Built: 1913

Site notes
- Architect(s): Taylor & Simister
- Architectural style: Edwardian Baroque style

Listed Building – Grade II
- Official name: Chadderton Town Hall and associated walls and walled garden, Middleton Road, Chadderton
- Designated: 16 July 2013
- Reference no.: 1404904

Chadderton Town Hall is a municipal building on Middleton Road, Chadderton, Greater Manchester, England. The town hall, which was the headquarters of Chadderton Urban District Council, is a grade II listed building.

== History ==
After a local board of health was established in Chadderton in 1873 and the Chadderton Lyceum then got into financial difficulties the following year, the board of health acquired the Lyceum's premises at the corner of Middleton Road and Melbourne Street and converted the building into Chadderton's first town hall. (Note: The Lyceum Building had been designed in the neoclassical style and built in 1868. After the council left the building in 1913, it went on to become a printing facility, then briefly a café, and finally a glass merchants' offices before being demolished in March 1975.) A young boy was killed, the main hall damaged and the offices on the floor below destroyed when a gas lantern exploded in the town hall in February 1884. The town became an urban district in 1894 and, in the early 20th century, the new civic leaders decided to vacate the old town hall and procure a purpose-built facility: the site selected between Victoria Street and Garforth Street had been occupied by a terrace of four private properties.

The foundation stone for the new building was laid by Councillor Ernest Kempsey on 30 March 1912. It was designed by Taylor & Simister of Oldham in the Edwardian Baroque style, built with red brick and stone dressings, and was officially opened by the chairman of the council, Herbert Wolstencroft, in 1913. The design involved a symmetrical main frontage with seven bays facing onto Middleton Road; the central bay, which slightly projected forward, featured a semi-circular stone porch with Ionic order columns with an entablature and a balcony above. There was a tall stained glass, round-headed window with a stone surround on the first floor and there were sash windows in the other bays both on the ground floor and the first floor. There was a large dome and clock lantern at roof level. Internally, the principal rooms were the council chamber, placed centrally above main entrance and beneath the dome, and the ballroom or 'public hall' located to the rear (and accessed by a separate entrance from Garforth Street). The ballroom featured a barrel vaulted ceiling. The design had been intended to provide "a broad and strong treatment of the English Renaissance" and it was complemented with extensive landscaping: the town hall has been described by the council as having "charming gardens".

A war memorial, sculpted by Albert Toft to commemorate the lives of local service personnel who had died in the First World War and featuring a figure of a soldier holding a rifle in his right hand, was unveiled in front of the building by Councillor Ernest Kempsey on 8 October 1921.

The building continued to serve as the headquarters of Chadderton Urban District Council for much of the 20th century but ceased to be local seat of government when the enlarged Oldham Council was formed in 1974. It became the register office for the Metropolitan Borough of Oldham in 2007 and subsequently served as a licensed venue for marriages and civil partnership ceremonies.

== See also ==
- Listed buildings in Chadderton
