= Old Town Hall, Oldham =

Municipal building in Oldham, Greater Manchester, England

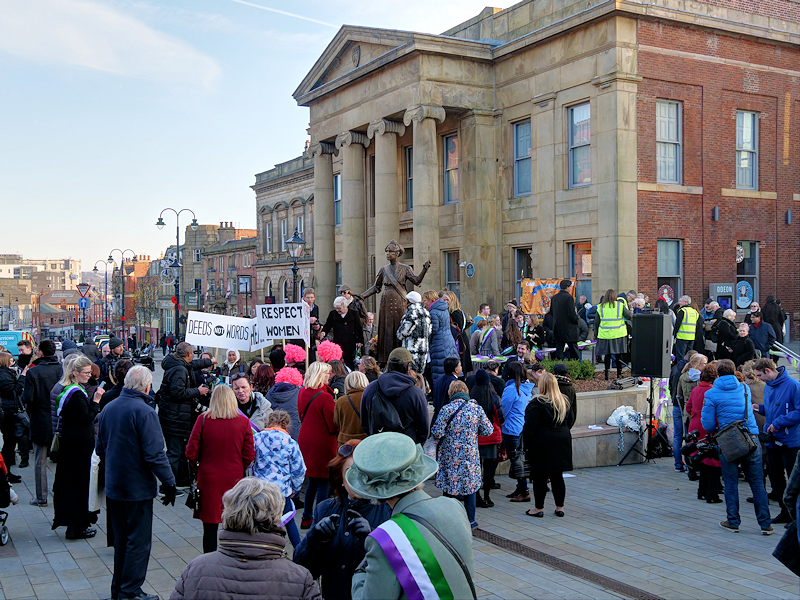
- The Old Town Hall in Oldham

- Shown in Greater Manchester
- 53.5416°N 2.1111°W
- Location: Yorkshire Street, Oldham

History
- Built: 1841

Site notes
- Architect: George Woodhouse
- Architectural style: Greek Revival style

Listed Building – Grade II
- Designated: 23 January 1973
- Reference no.: 1201655

The Old Town Hall is a municipal building in Yorkshire Street, Oldham, England. It is a Grade II listed building.

== History ==
The building, which was designed by George Woodhouse in the Greek revival style, was completed in 1841 and extended in 1880. It has a tetrastyle Ionic portico, copied from the temple of Ceres, on the River Ilisos, near Athens. A blue plaque on the exterior of the building commemorates Winston Churchill making his inaugural acceptance speech from the steps of the town hall when he was first elected as a Conservative MP in 1900.

The building became the headquarters of the Municipal Borough of Oldham in 1849 and the headquarters of the County Borough of Oldham in 1889. Queen Elizabeth II, accompanied by the Duke of Edinburgh, visited Oldham and inspected a guard of honour outside the town hall in October 1954.

The town hall became the headquarters of the Metropolitan Borough of Oldham in 1974 but, after the council moved to Oldham Civic Centre in 1977, the building stood empty for many years. In October 2009 the Victorian Society declared the Town Hall as the most endangered Victorian structure in England and Wales. Proposals were sought for the redevelopment of the building and, following works undertaken by Morgan Sindall to a design by the Building Design Partnership, it re-opened as a modern multiplex Odeon cinema in 2016.

After a fund-raising campaign supported by the locally-born actress, Maxine Peake, a bronze statue of the local suffragette, Annie Kenney, funded by public subscription, was unveiled outside the building in December 2018.

== See also ==
- Listed buildings in Oldham
