= Albert Toft =

English sculptor (1862–1949)

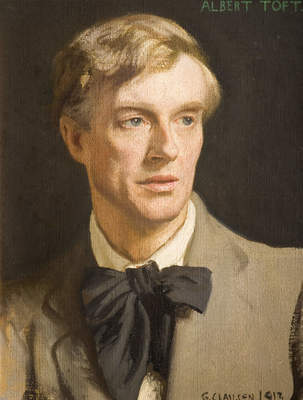
- Albert Toft by George Clausen
- Born: 3 June 1862; Handsworth, Staffordshire, England
- Died: 18 December 1949 (aged 87); Worthing, Sussex, England
- Education: South Kensington Schools
- Occupation: Sculptor

Albert Toft (3 June 1862 – 18 December 1949) was a British sculptor.

Toft's career was dominated by public commemorative commissions in bronze, mostly single statues of military or royal figures. The Diamond Jubilee of Queen Victoria in 1897, Boer War to 1902, and then World War I to 1918, provided plentiful commissions. The Oxford Dictionary of National Biography describes Toft as one of the major figures of the "New Sculpture" movement following on from William Hamo Thornycroft and George Frampton. Toft described his work as 'Idealist' but he also said of himself that "to become an idealist you must necessarily first be a realist."

His father was a notable modeller in ceramics, and his brother was the landscape artist Joseph Alfonso Toft.

== Biography ==
Toft was born in Handsworth, then in Staffordshire, and now a suburb of Birmingham. His parents were Charles Toft (1832–1909) and Rosanna Reeves. His father was a senior modeller at Mintons, and then the chief modeller at Wedgwood pottery. He had also taught modelling at Birmingham School of Art for some years to 1873.

Toft trained at Wedgwood, and attended art schools in Hanley, Staffordshire and Newcastle upon Tyne. In 1881 he won a scholarship to study sculpture at the South Kensington Schools under Professor Édouard Lantéri. He received silver medals in his second and third years.

From 1885 onwards Toft exhibited at the Royal Academy and some of his most notable works exhibited at the Royal Academy included Fate-Led (1890, now at Walker Art Gallery), The Sere and Yellow Leaf (1892), Spring (1897, now at Birmingham Museum and Art Gallery), The Spirit of Contemplation (1901; Laing Art Gallery, Newcastle) and The Metal Pourer (1915). In 1915 his sculpture The Bather was purchased using the Royal Academy's Chantrey Fund. His 1888 bust of William Ewart Gladstone for the National Liberal Club was modelled from life and acclaimed as one of the best. In 1900 Toft received a bronze medal at the Universal Exhibition in Paris.

He created monuments to Queen Victoria for Leamington Spa, Nottingham, and South Shields, and to Edward VII in Birmingham and Warwick. He designed the coronation medal of George V and Queen Mary (1911) and a statuette of W. S. Penley playing Charley's Aunt for Royal Doulton (1913). He also published a book, Modelling and Sculpture in 1911, which was reprinted in 1949.

He made a series of war memorials, starting with the South African War Memorial in Cardiff (1910), and then many after the First World War, including the Royal Fusiliers War Memorial in London (1922), and four statues for the Birmingham Hall of Memory (1923–24).

In 1891 Toft was elected to the Art Workers Guild and in 1938 he was elected a fellow to the Royal Society of British Sculptors.

He died in Worthing.

== Public monuments and memorials ==
Image	Title / subject	Location and coordinates	Date	Type	Material	Dimensions	Designation	Wikidata	Notes
	George Wallis	National Art Library, Victoria and Albert Museum	1889	Bust	Terracotta	61.5cm high			
	Major Jonathen White	Nottingham Castle	1891	Bust on pedestal	Bronze and granite				Major White (1804–1889) served in the Robin Hood Rifles.
More images	Henry Richard	Tregaron, Ceredigion	1893	Statue on pedestal	Bronze and granite	5.5m high	Grade II	Q29495968	
More images	Philip James Bailey	Nottingham Castle	1901	Bust and panel	Bronze				
More images	Queen Victoria	Town Hall, Royal Leamington Spa	1901	Statue on pedestal	Sicilian marble and Aberdeen granite	3 metres high statue on a 4 metres high pedestal	Grade II	Q26661547	
More images	The Spirit of Contemplation	Laing Art Gallery	1901	Statue	Bronze				
More images	Charles Mark Palmer	Jarrow, Tyneside	1903	Statue on pedestal with panels	Bronze and Portland stone		Grade II	Q26637979	
More images	Queen Victoria	Memorial Park, Nottingham	1905	Statue on pedestal	Marble and granite		Grade II	Q26560473	
More images	Boer War memorial	Christchurch Park, Ipswich	1906	Statue on pedestal with plaques	Bronze and stone		Grade II	Q26530640	
More images	Boer War memorial	Cannon Hill Park, Birmingham	1906	Sculpture group on tapered pedestal with reliefs and plaques	Bronze and granite	6M tall	Grade II*	Q26162445	
More images	South African War Memorial	Cathays Park, Cardiff	1909	Sculptures on pedestal & base	Bronze and Portland stone		Grade II*	Q17741148	
	Memorial to Alistair Mackenzie	St James's Church, Abinger Common, Abinger	1910	Wall tablet			Grade II*		
More images	King Edward VII Memorial	Centenary Square, Birmingham	1913	Statue on pedestal	Stone		Grade II	Q6411498	
More images	Queen Victoria	South Shields	c. 1913	Statue on pedestal	Bronze and granite		Grade II	Q26525766	Originally erected with four supporting figures, now located elsewhere in South Shields
	The Bather	Victoria and Albert Museum	1915	Statue	Marble				On loan from the Tate
More images	City and Midland Bank War Memorial	Upper Bank Street, Canary Wharf, London	1921	Two sculptures, 14 inscribed panels and pediment	Bronze and marble			Q112127933	Sculptures represent St George and the Recording Angel.
More images	War memorial	Granville Square, Stone, Staffordshire	1921	Statue on pedestal with plaques	Bronze and stone		Grade II	Q26513651	
More images	War memorial	Sandon Estate, Sandon, Staffordshire	1921	Statue on pedestal with plaques	Bronze and stone			Q104245206	
More images	War memorial	Chadderton Town Hall, Greater Manchester	1921	Statue on obelisk and base	Bronze and granite		Grade II	Q26320858	
More images	Royal Fusiliers War Memorial	Holborn, London	1922	Statue on pedestal	Bronze and Portland stone		Grade II*	Q7374415	
More images	War memorial	Euston Place, Royal Leamington Spa, Warwickshire	1922	Statue on inscribed pedestal	Bronze and Cornish granite		Grade II	Q26661550	
More images	Streatham War Memorial	Streatham, London	1922	Statue on pedestal	Bronze and stone		Grade II	Q32946115	
	Savage Club war memorial	National Liberal Club, London	1922	Plaque	Stone				
More images	War memorial	Benenden, Kent	1923	Sculpture on pedestal	Bronze and stone		Grade II	Q26371278	
More images	Thornton-Cleveleys War Memorial	Thornton Cleveleys, Lancashire	1923	Statue on pedestal	Bronze and granite		Grade II	Q108695758	
More images	Oldham War Memorial	Grounds of St Mary's Church, Oldham, Lancashire	1923	Sculpture group on pedestal and base	Bronze and granite		Grade II*	Q22115519	Architect, Thomas Taylor
	GKN War memorial	Thimblemill Recreation Ground, Smethwick	1924	Statue on pedestal and steps	Bronze and stone		Grade II		
More images	The Armed Forces and Nursing Services	Hall of Memory, Birmingham	1923	4 Sculptures	Bronze		Grade I	Q5642705	
More images	41st Division, Royal Fusiliers War Memorial	Flers, Somme, France	1932	Statue on pedestal	Bronze and stone				Figure is a version of the Holborn memorial statue.
More images	Frank Brangwyn	National Museum Cardiff	1937	Bust	Bronze	59.0cm			
More images	World War II Midland Bank Staff Memorial	Canary Wharf, London	Unveiled 1950	Reliefs and panels	Stone and marble			Q112127933	Originally located in Poultry in the City of London

== Other works ==
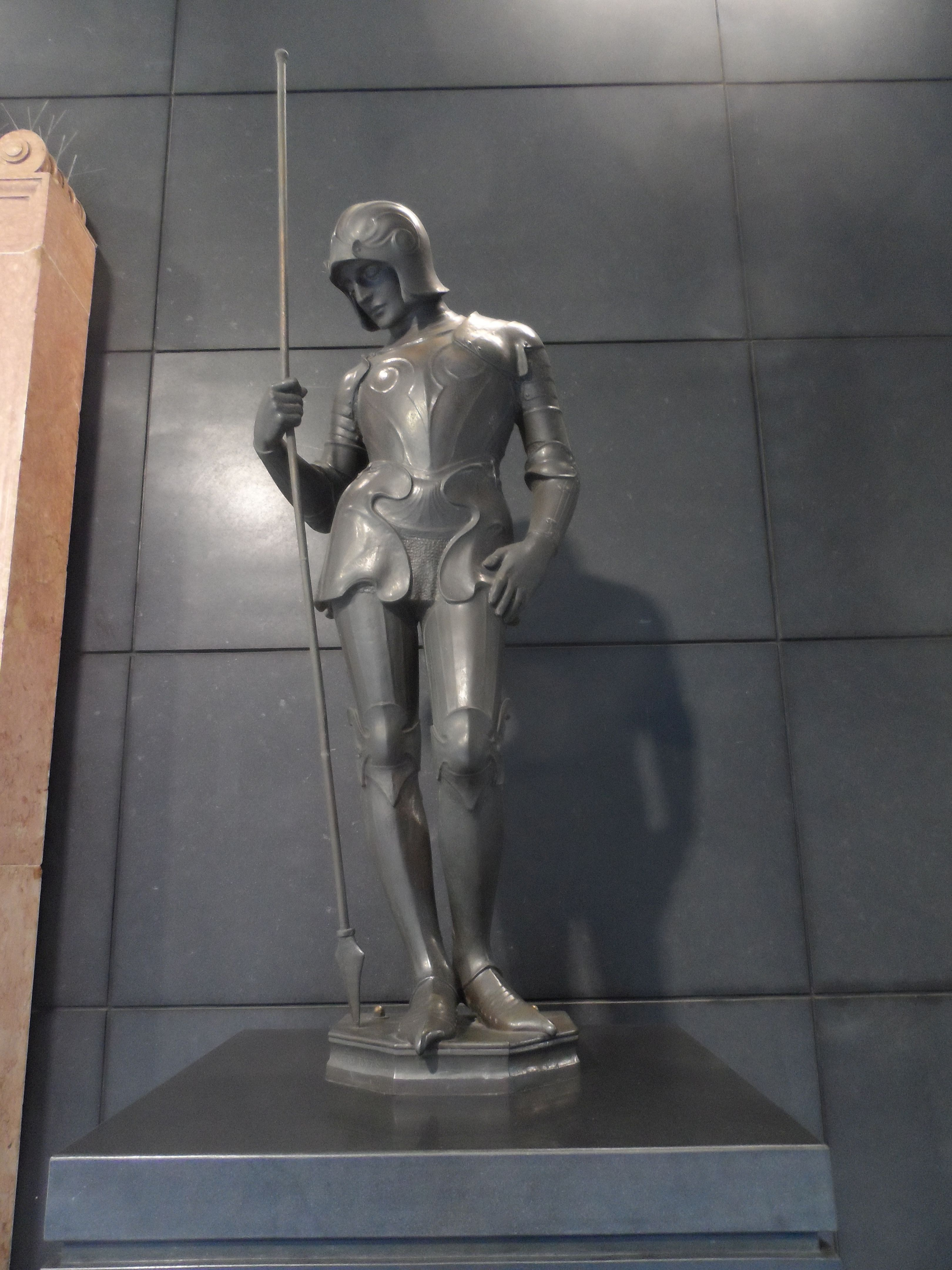
Saint George statue for London Joint City and Midland Bank war memorial

- Two figures for the Union Assurance war memorial
- Memorial to Charles Swinnerton Heap, unveiled 1901, relocated to Walsall Town Hall in 1905.
- Bronze study of the actress Ellaline Terriss, 1901, held in a private collection.
- Children of the Sculptor, 1904, this study by Toft of three of his children is held in a private collection.
- Tomb effigy in marble of Sir John Robinson, 1930, St Anne's Church, Worksop
- Maternity, held in a private collection, this work is said to show the influence of the Lantéri-Dalou tradition.
- Fate-led, Walker Art Gallery, Liverpool.

== Gallery ==
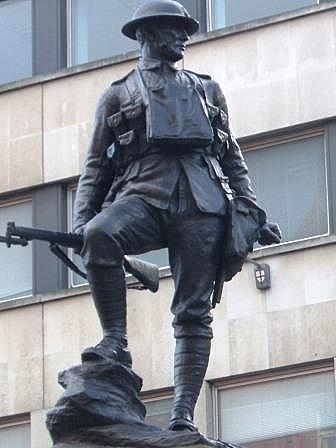
Royal Fusiliers War Memorial, Holborn, London

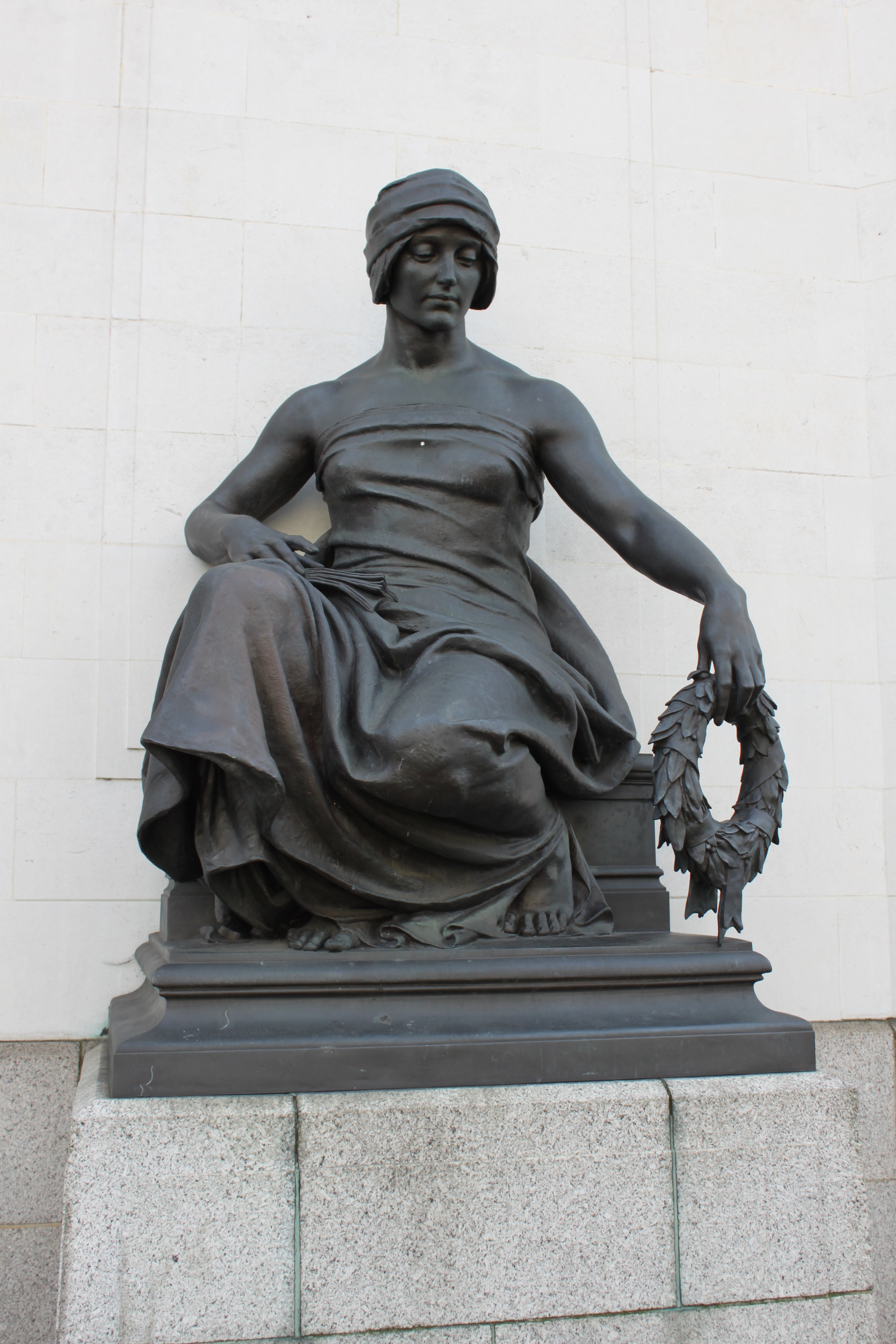
The Nursing Service, Birmingham Hall of Memory.

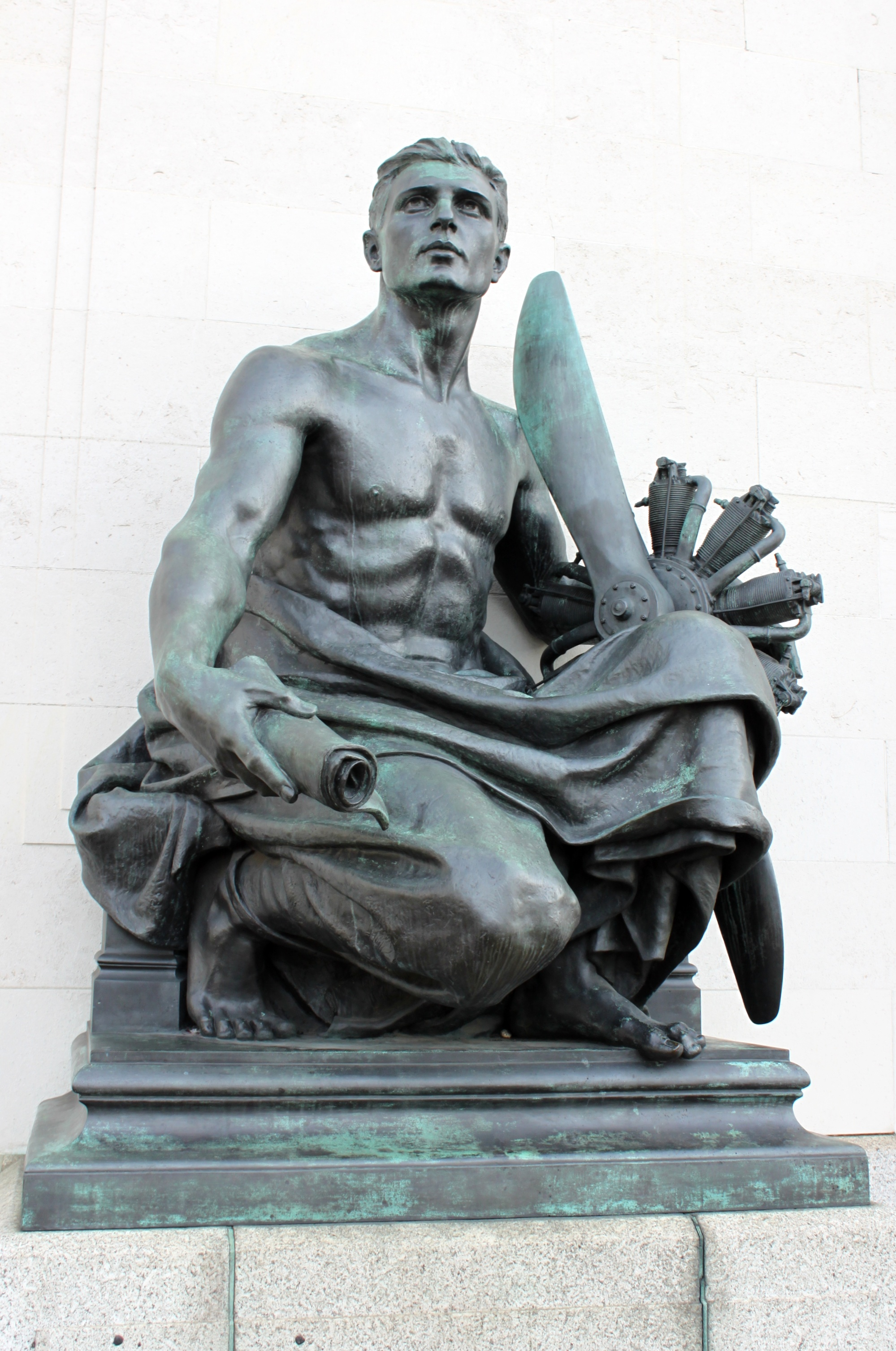
The Air Force, Birmingham Hall of Memory.

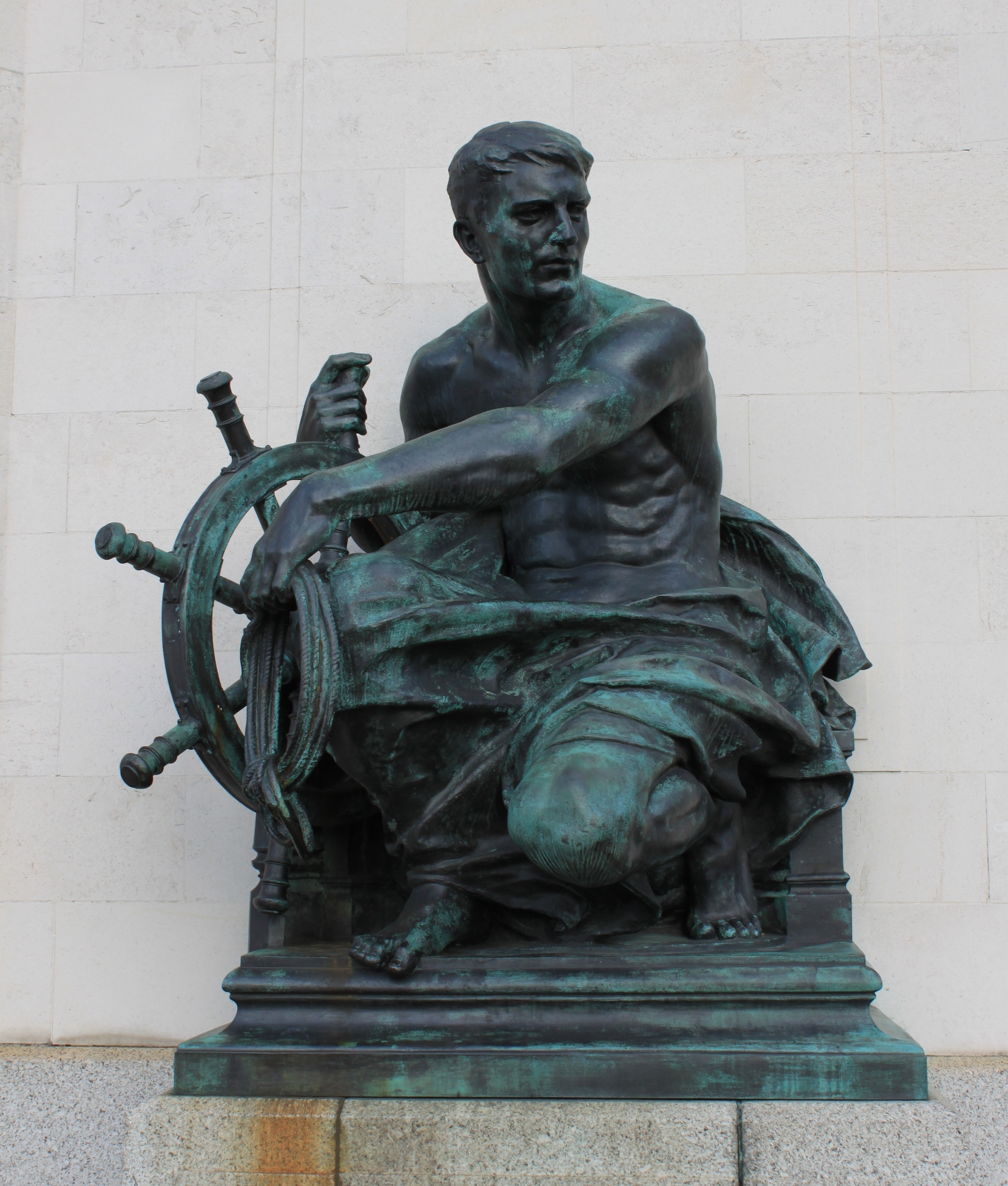
The Royal Navy, Birmingham Hall of Memory.

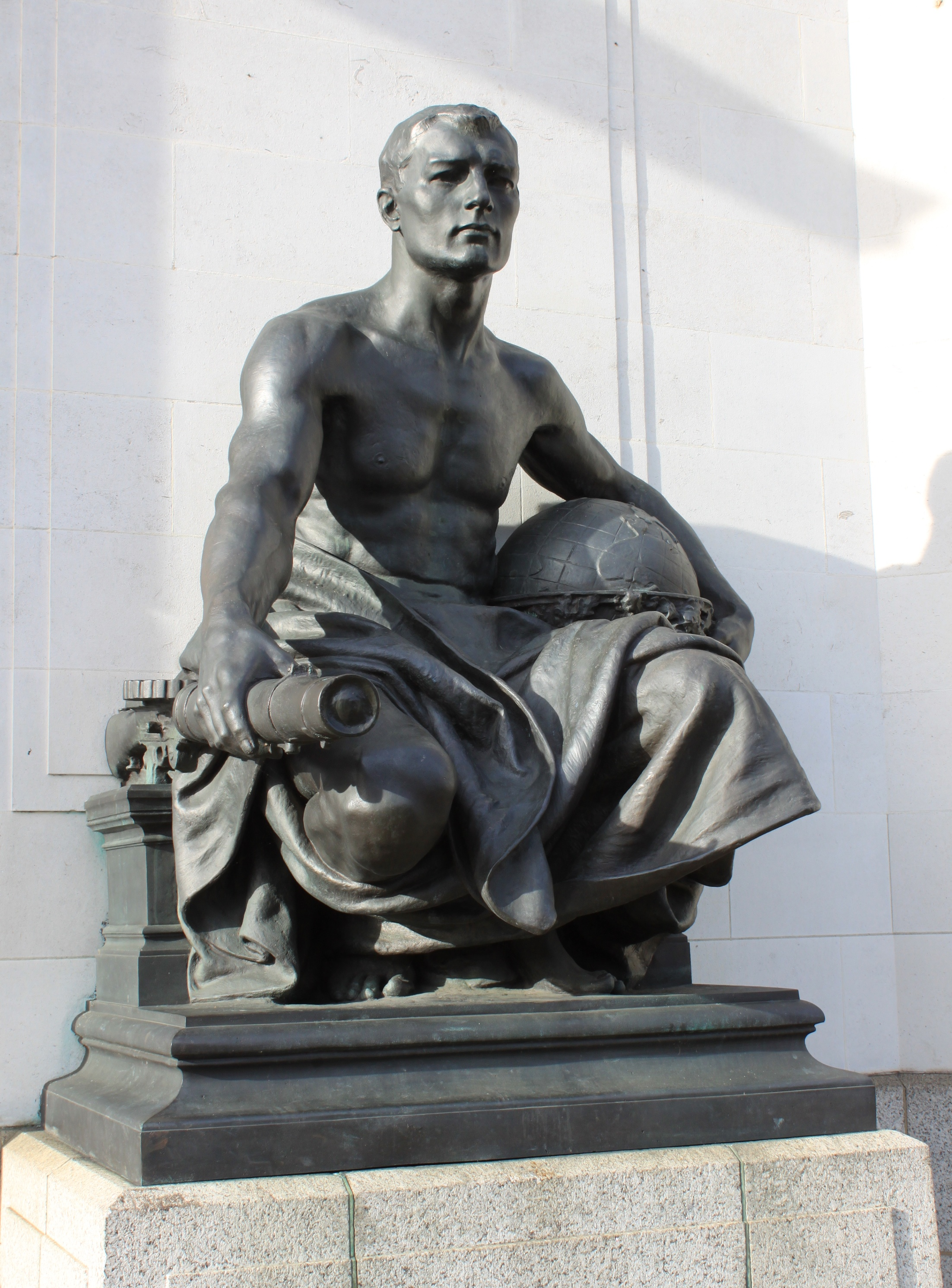
The Army, Birmingham Hall of Memory.

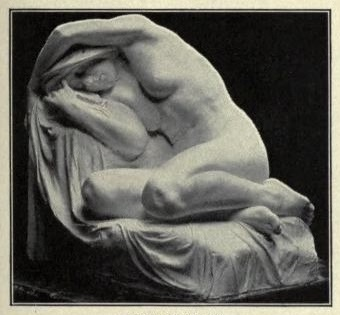
Antigone.

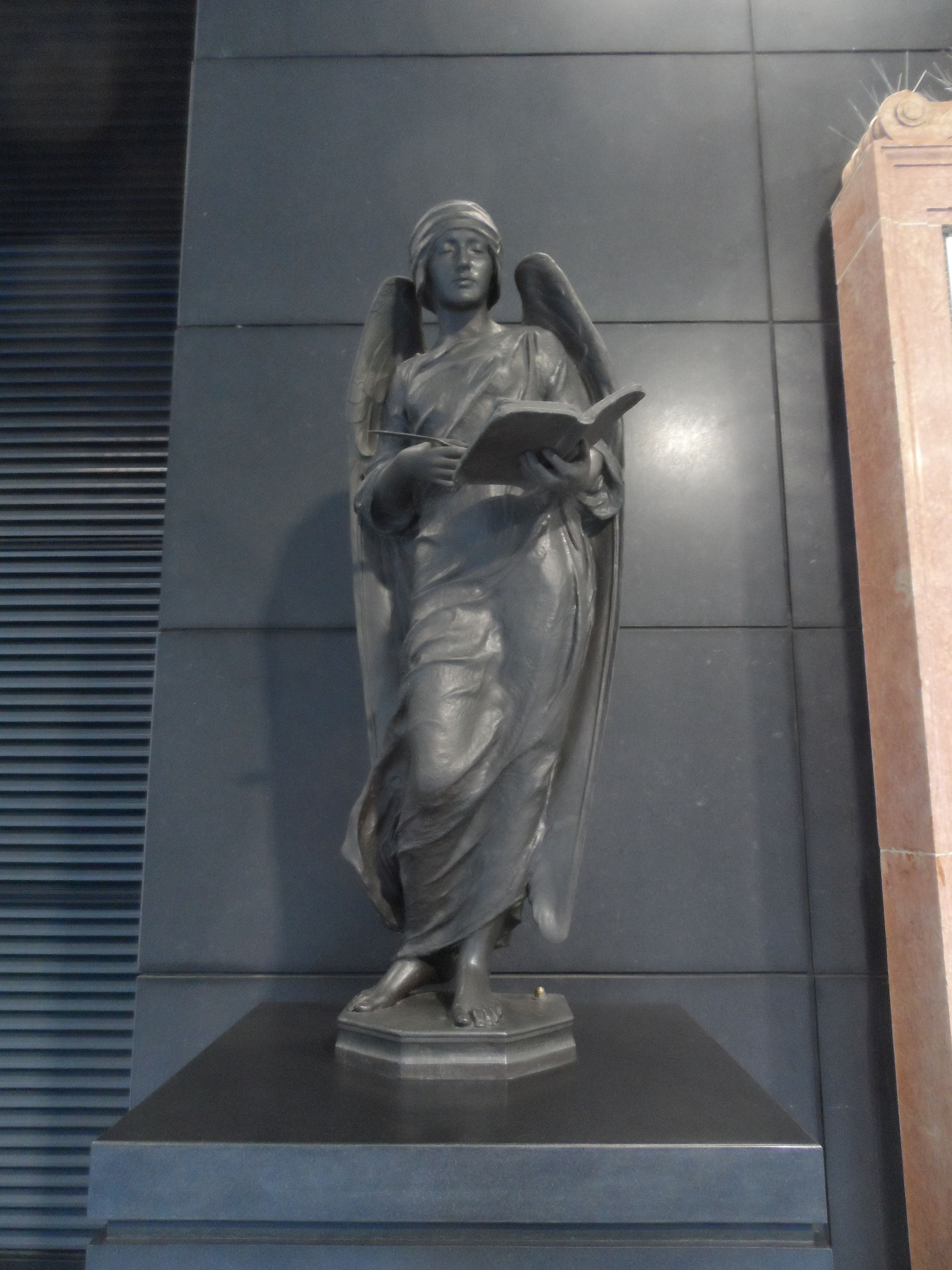
Recording Angel statue for London Joint City and Midland Bank war memorial
