= Stock Brook =

Area of Chadderton, Greater Manchester, England

Coordinates: 53.542543°N 2.1463650°W

- Location within Greater Manchester
- OS grid reference: SD 90398 05110
- Metropolitan borough: Oldham
- Metropolitan county: Greater Manchester
- Region: North West
- Country: England
- Sovereign state: United Kingdom
- Post town: OLDHAM
- Postcode district: OL9
- Dialling code: 0161
- Police: Greater Manchester
- Fire: Greater Manchester
- Ambulance: North West
- UK Parliament: Oldham West and Royton

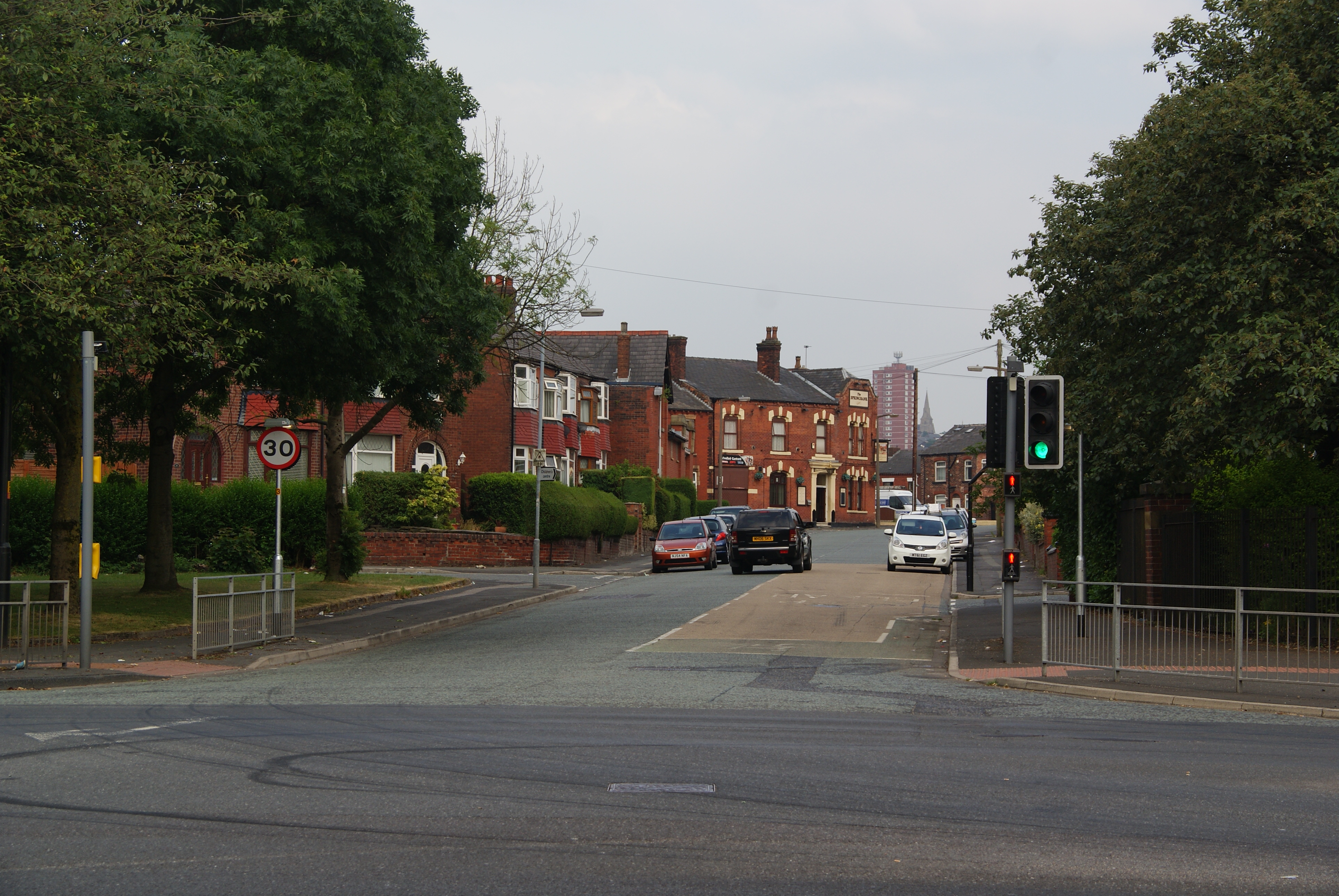
View of Hunt Lane, Stock Brook, looking towards the Springbank public house

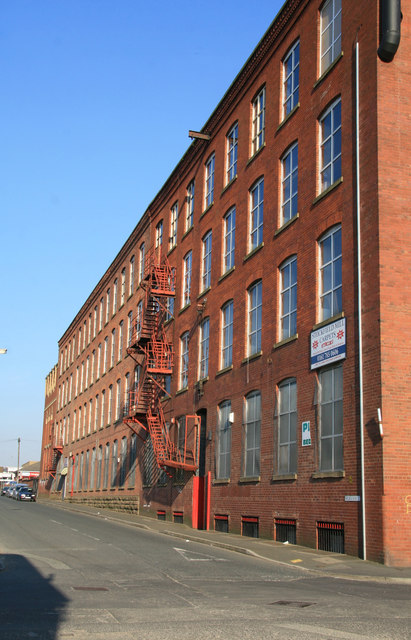
Stockfield Mill

Stock Brook is a residential and industrial area in the town of Chadderton in the Metropolitan Borough of Oldham, Greater Manchester, England. It is contiguous with Chadderton's town centre area and with Nimble Nook, Cowhill and Nordens.

The area takes its name from a local stream, the Stock Brook. The brook itself has been culverted through most of the area since the 19th century, emerging at a point near Broadway at the site of the former Bank Mill.

The area is served by St Luke's (Church of England) Primary School.

== History ==
One of Chadderton's oldest districts, Stock Brook was the location of the town's oldest water-powered cotton mill, The Bank, which dates from 1776, being demolished c1885.

Stock Brook Mill dated from 1791, the mill being demolished in 1895. In common with other areas of the town Stock Brook saw significant expansion during the late 19th century cotton boom. Most of these mills have now been demolished but the Stockfield Mill, dating from 1862, is still in use (see also List of mills in Chadderton).

The Springbank Bowling Club is a long-standing bowling and social club in the area that can trace its roots to the Chadderton Lyceum, an educational institute dating back to 1868.

The area also has a long-standing public house, The Spring Bank, first licensed in 1888.

== St Luke's Church ==
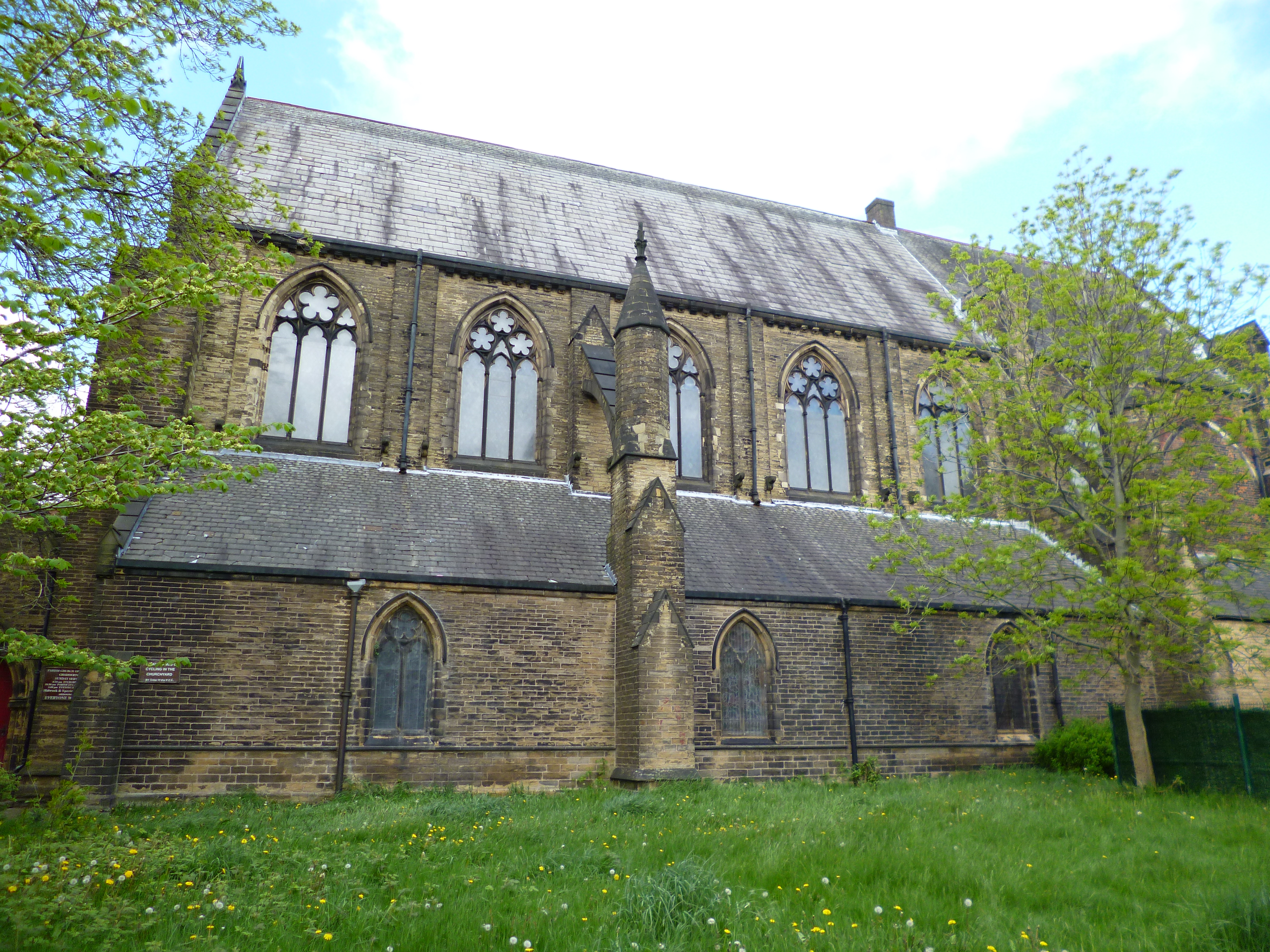
St Luke's Church

The Parish of St Luke's was established in 1875 but owes its beginnings to Stock Brook Sunday School, which began in a cottage, then a reeling room above a row of cottages, in Stock Brook in 1818.

The church building began in 1882, but it was 1888 before it was finished — at a cost of £6,500.

The building was badly damaged by fire in 1954, but the congregation recovered and made sure it was repaired and reopened.

The church, which was Chadderton's largest, holding 500 worshippers, was closed in 2008 having seen congregations dwindle to an average of only 25–30.

The parish has now been merged with St. Matthew's Church, Chadderton.

St Luke's is a grade II listed building.
