= Cowhill, Greater Manchester =

Area of Chadderton, Greater Manchester, England

Coordinates: 53.538956°N 2.1383217°W

Cowhill
- Location within Greater Manchester
- OS grid reference: SD 90950 04701
- Metropolitan borough: Oldham
- Metropolitan county: Greater Manchester
- Region: North West
- Country: England
- Sovereign state: United Kingdom
- Post town: OLDHAM
- Postcode district: OL9
- Dialling code: 0161
- Police: Greater Manchester
- Fire: Greater Manchester
- Ambulance: North West
- UK Parliament: Oldham West and Royton

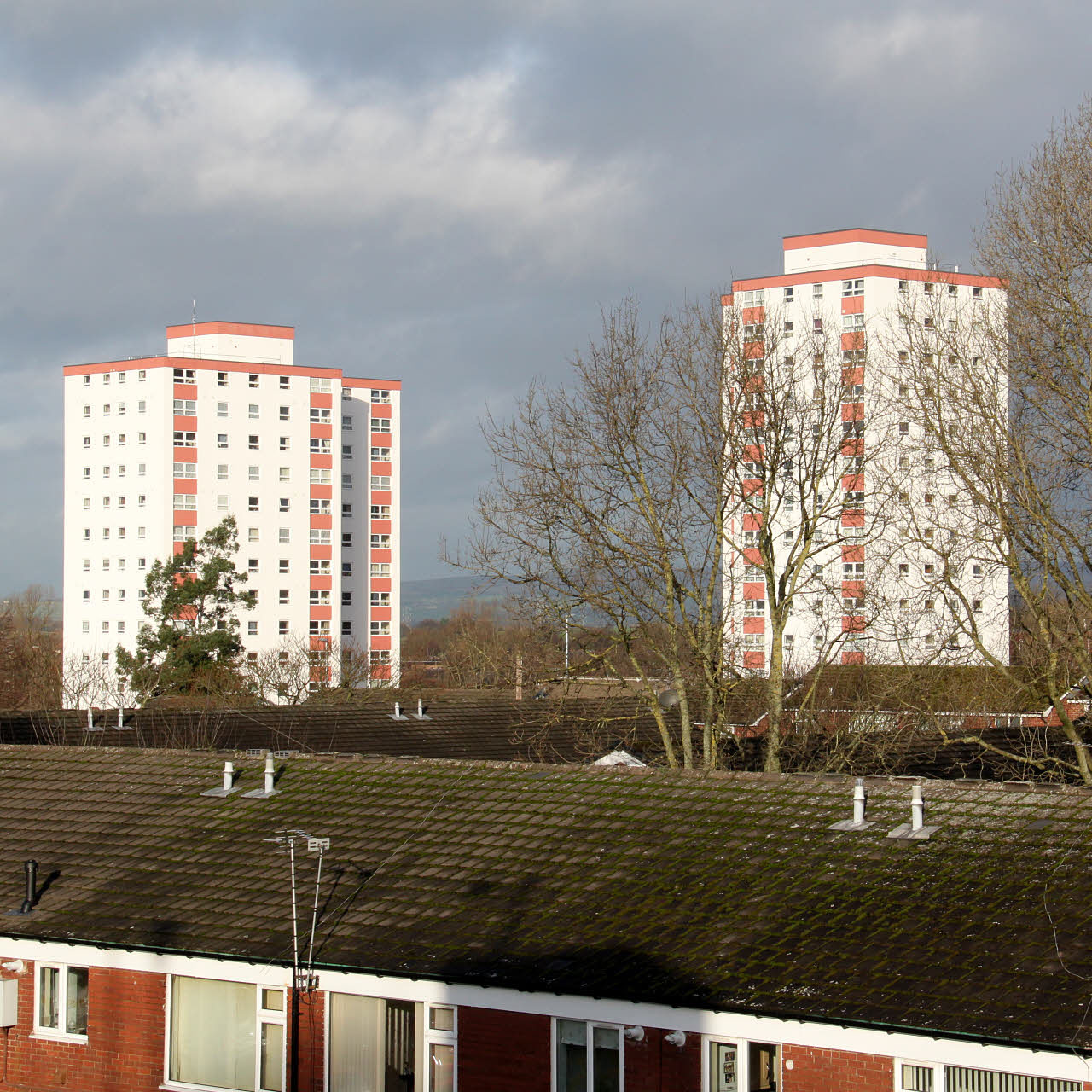
View of Cowhill taken from Freehold Metrolink Station

Cowhill (archaically Cow Hill) is a locality of Chadderton, in the Metropolitan Borough of Oldham, Greater Manchester, England.

It is located 0.5 miles (0.80 km) southeast of Chadderton town centre close to its eastern boundary with Oldham and is contiguous with the Block Lane, Stock Brook, Butler Green and Nimble Nook areas of the town and with Freehold and Westwood in Oldham.

An ancient hamlet which grew into an industrial village, Cowhill is now a residential area and includes a large housing development, Crossley Estate, built as part of widespread redevelopment of the area in the 1960s and 1970s. 2014 saw the completion of major refurbishment of the estate including 87 new houses and a new community centre, The Crossley Centre.

Adjoining the Crossley Estate are the Crossley Playing Fields which features five football pitches plus changing room facilities. The playing fields and changing rooms were completely refurbished during 2015. The work was carried out by Oldham Council and supported by the Premier League and the FA Facilities Fund, which provides grants towards developing new or refurbished grassroots football facilities.

Cow Hill sub post office, located at 299 Denton Lane, was the last institution to bear the locality's name. It closed as part of the Post Office's restructuring of services in 2008–09.

The area is served by Christ Church (Church of England) Primary School.

== History ==
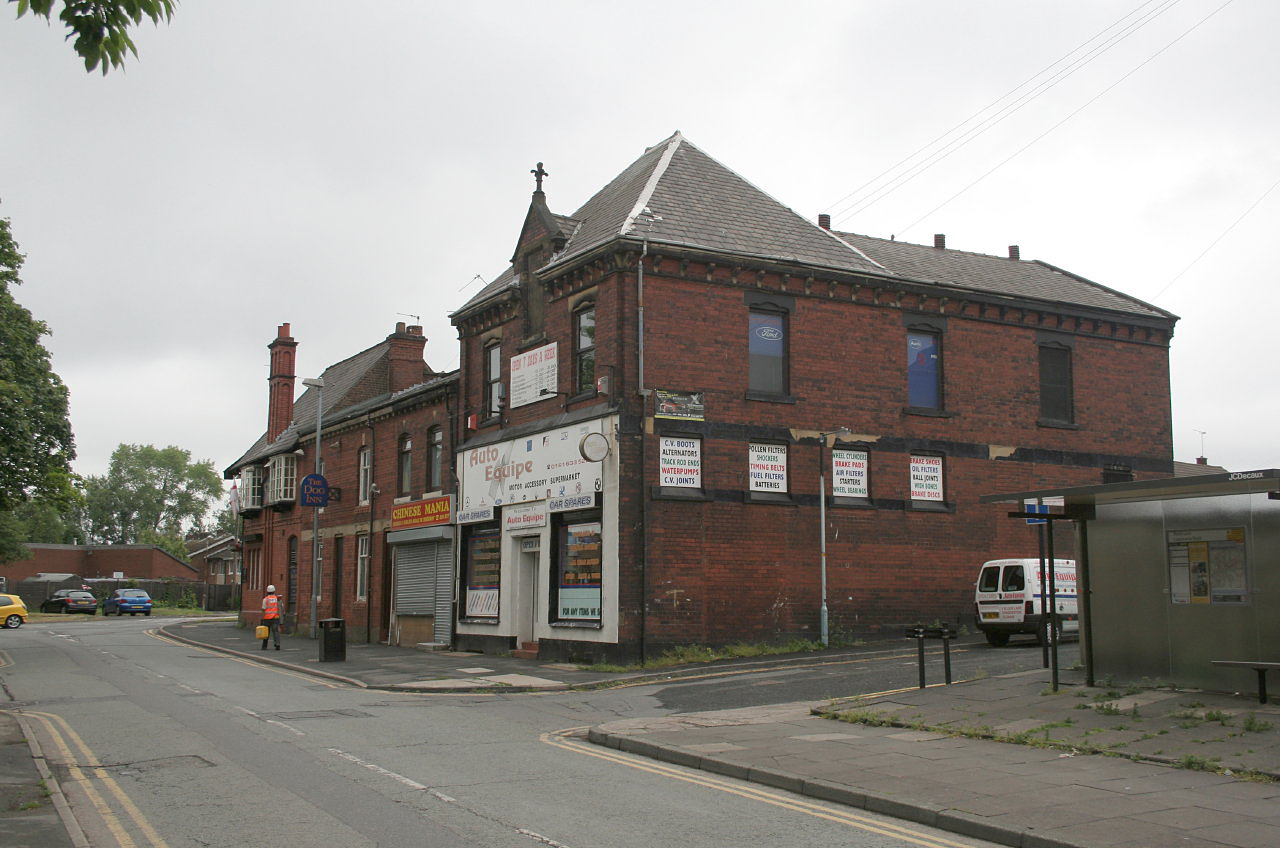
Former Co-op Store, Block Lane. Dog Inn located on the corner

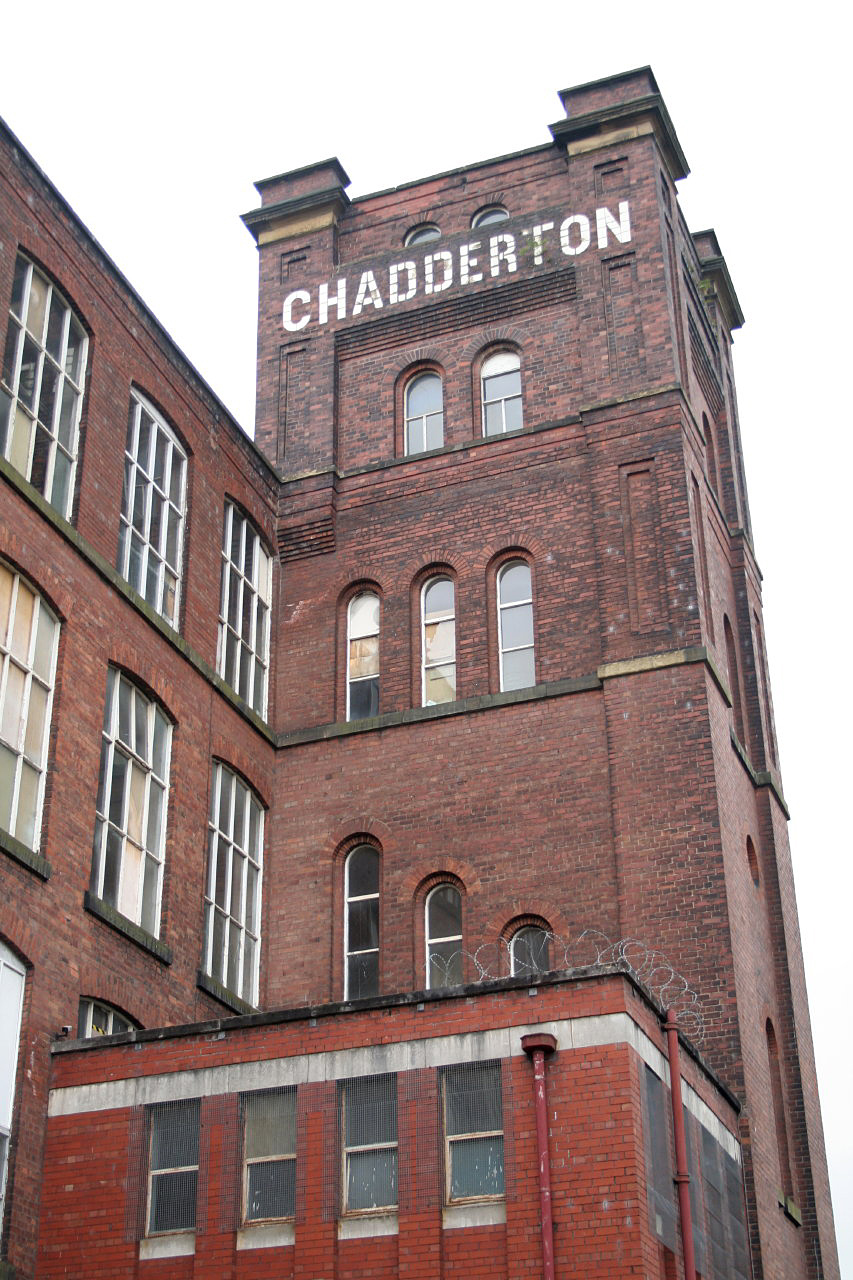
Chadderton Mill

Mentioned in the mid-16th century as Coohill and Cohyll, the district's growth during the late 18th and early 19th centuries led to this description in 1826 by local historian James Butterworth -

"Cowhill, with Alder Root, form united a kind of small village with two public houses and a considerable number of cottages".

Twice in the 17th century Chadderton was to see many of its inhabitants die from plague epidemics. The first occurred in 1633 when many deaths were recorded in Cowhill.

Prior to 1810 and the construction of the Middleton to Oldham Turnpike road (Middleton Road) Cowhill and Alder Root formed part of the main route from Chadderton and Oldham to Middleton.

Noted for its coal mining community, it once had several public houses, but only two remain. The Dog Inn was first licensed in 1750, and is Chadderton's oldest licensed premises, a distinction it shares with The Boat and Horses at Whitegate. The Crown (also known locally as The Sump Hole) dates to the early 1870s.

In 1819 The Dog Inn was one of Chadderton's two meeting places for a contingent of townsfolk who marched to Manchester for the iil-fated political demonstration that came to be known as the Peterloo Massacre. John Ashton of Cowhill was one of the 15 fatalities of that incident. Ashton, a 41 year old weaver died after being sabred and trampled to death by the crowd. A father-of-one, there is evidence to suggest he was also a former soldier who served with the 6th regiment of infantry between 1805 and 1818. Ashton was a member of the Saddleworth, Lees and Mossley Union and was carrying their black banner inscribed with words 'Taxation without representation is unjust and tyrannical. NO CORN LAWS'.

The mid 19th century saw the construction of the first railway line into Oldham pass through Cowhill. The Middleton Junction and Oldham Branch Railway line opened on 31 March 1842 to Oldham Werneth railway station. A second line passed through the area on 17 May 1880 with the opening of the Oldham Loop Line from Manchester. The two lines converged near Alder Root. (See Oldham Loop Line).

Crossley Playing Fields have a varied history and a stream (the Stock Brook), ran through it in the 1840s before becoming culverted. Around this time Stockfield Colliery opened on the south side of the railway line. The colliery was closed in 1932 but the railway remained open until 1949/50 when active tipping was noted on the site. In 1980 the site was completely reinstated using landfill.

Several cotton spinning mills were built during the cotton boom of mid to late 1800s including Alder Root Mill (1860–1883), Chadderton Mill (1885 - still standing), Glenby (1885–1962) and Osborne (1853–1973). See List of mills in Chadderton. The Chadderton Mill is a grade II listed building. The mill ceased production in June 2000, being the last cotton mill in Chadderton to function as such.

On 22 April 1907, the Walsh Street railway bridge was the location of a railway incident that became known as the 'Cow Hill Accident' involving a dozen privately owned wagons drawn by Platt Brothers locomotives. The siding along which the train was running descended steeply towards a stop-block adjacent to Walsh Street. Running out of control, the train continued through the stop-block and crashed, wagon after wagon into the street below.

Cowhill had a school, churches, farms, mills and factories, a Conservative Club, and held an annual fair, 'Cowhill Wakes', but widespread redevelopment during the 1970s swept most of this away. Cow Hill Lane was renamed as part of an extended Denton Lane during this period.

== Religion ==
The Wesleyan Methodist movement established a church on the corner of Manchester Street and St Domingo Street, Oldham (now Rochdale Road) at which John Wesley preached on 2 April 1790, From that church two workers were sent to establish a 'Society Class' in Cowhill on the outskirts of town. For a while the society flourished, meeting in houses or the 'National School', but with the departure of the two key workers and the national controversy agitating the Wesleyan Methodist cause the society dwindled until it ceased to exist. The work was re-established in 1847. The Methodists held open air services and cottage prayer meetings in premises at Old Lane, Bank Mill at Stock Brook and Denton Lane. Visits to these outlying spots became dangerous with ropes tied across the dark lanes to trip up the worshippers, who were then pelted with sods and stones. The antagonism increased with the village bell man going around the area urging the people to yell and shout whenever they met.

On 5 July 1854 a request was made to friends and every home in the village, to subscribe to a new school. In April 1855 the foundations of Cowhill Methodist Church and School were laid and the church opened on 29 July 1855. It was located on Block Lane between the Dog Inn and the railway bridge that is now the location of Freehold Metrolink station. The church closed in 1966 when it amalgamated with other local churches to form South Chadderton Methodist Church at Butler Green.

In the 1880s the new parish church of Christ Church, situated just along Block Lane, had begun a mission work in a cottage in Cowhill. This cottage was opposite the old "Dusty Miller" public house and was known by both its friends and enemies as "Cowhill Cathedral." It later moved to number 27 Walsh St where the activities of the "Cowhill Mission" carried on well into the 20th century.

== Cowhill Council School ==
A temporary school was first erected in 1814 at the expense of Sir Thomas Horton of Chadderton Hall and the National Schools Society. It lay on the opposite side of Cowhill Lane (now Denton Lane) to the Glenby Mill on land which had been the bowling green of an inn (The Blue Bell). The foundation stone for the main school building was laid on 24 June 1818.

It was used as a Sunday school and an occasional day school initially independent of any church. Consequently, the Methodists in Cowhill established a Sunday school of their own in 1828 and began regular services in the school, but these were discontinued in about 1835, re-establishing itself in 1847. (This school building was demolished and rebuilt in about 1876 due to the construction of the embankment for the Oldham Loop Line Railway).

In 1894 the school Trustees, unable to financially support the school, let the premises to the Chadderton School Board.

The school closed on 19 June 1905, the building being considered too redundant for educational use, and most of the students were transferred to the new Stanley Road Council School.

== Cowhill Wakes ==
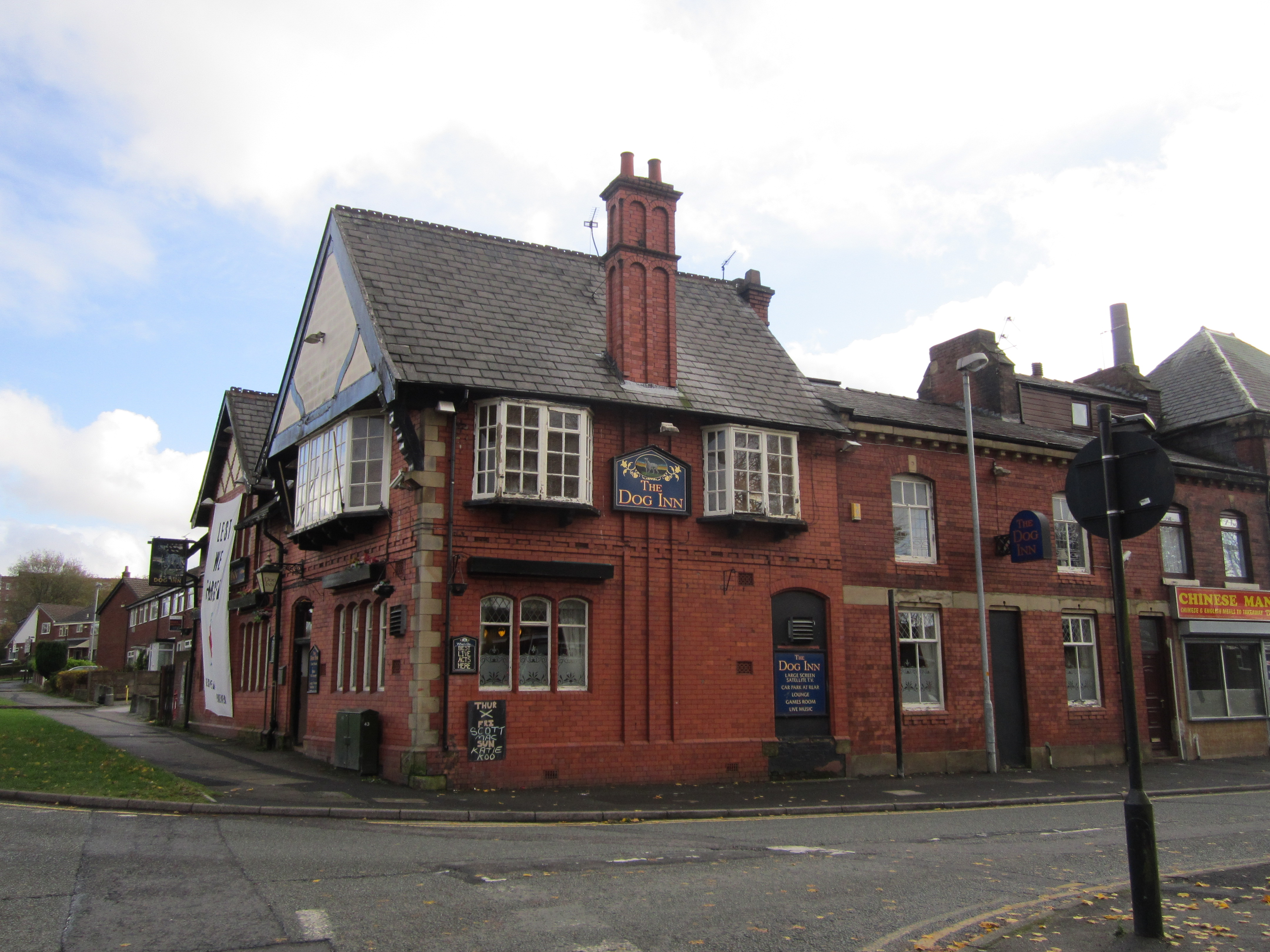
The Dog Inn at Cowhill, Chadderton

The Wakes was celebrated towards the end of August and evolved into a public holiday when workers in the cotton mills were given time off from work and, if fortunate, went to the seaside for a weeks break. Funfairs became part of the tradition and Wakes became established as a time for fun and enjoyment.

In Chadderton the local Wakes took on a new aspect when the landlord of the Dog Inn at Cowhill, Samuel Kay, established a fair in 1886 on nearby land as a means of promoting sales in his establishment. So successful was the venture that Cowhill Wakes became an annual event in August until it was discontinued about 1960.

== Transport ==
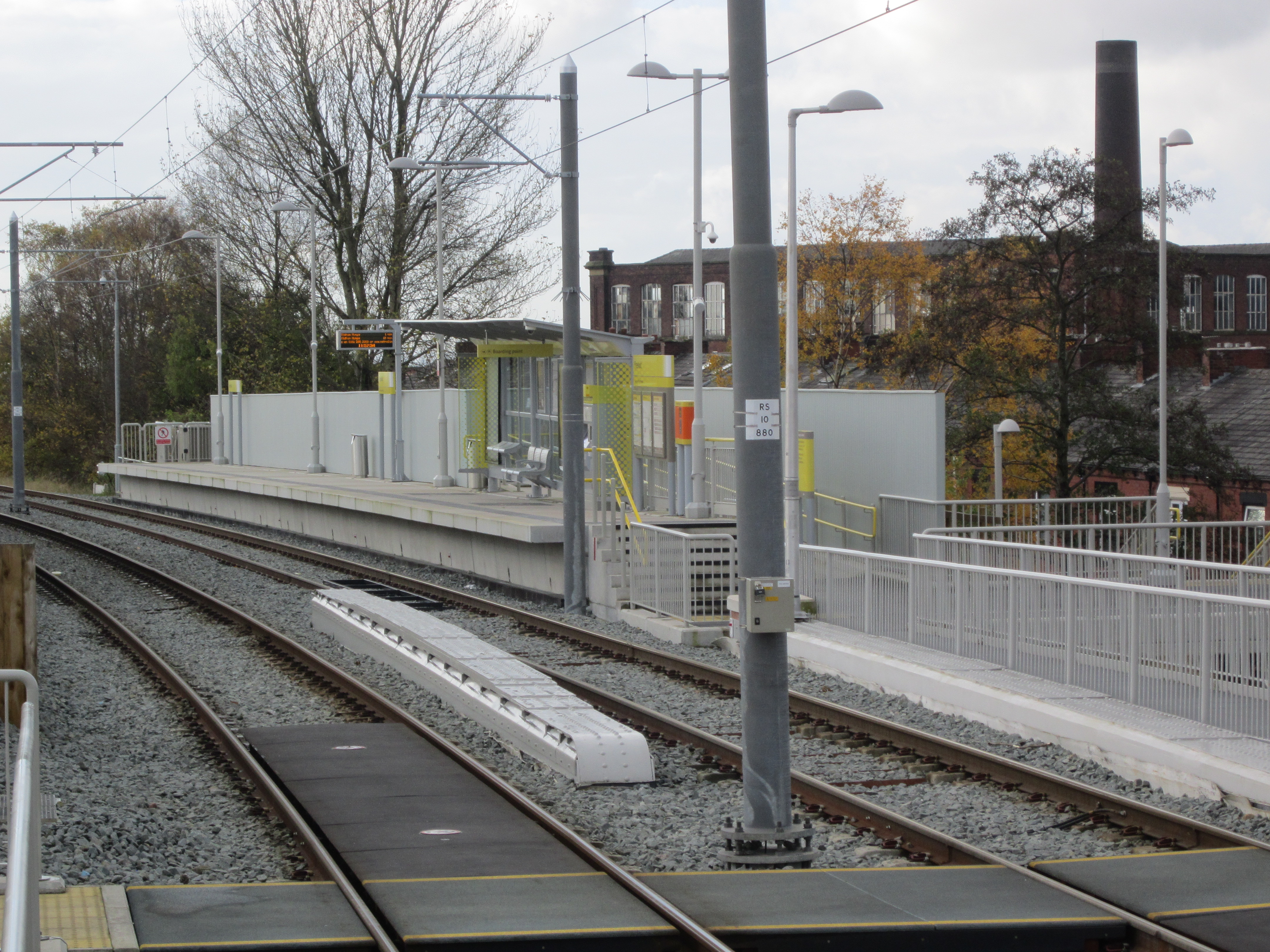
Freehold Metrolink Station, overlooking Chadderton Mill

Bee Network operates bus service 415 linking Cowhill with Oldham and Middleton.

Bee Network operates bus service 159 to Oldham via Chadderton town centre and to Middleton via Hollinwood, Woodhouses, Failsworth and New Moston and service 396 providing links to Ashton-U-Lyne and to Middleton via Chadderton town centre.

Stagecoach Manchester operated bus service 152 to Hollinwood and to Firwood Park via Chadderton town centre, the service being withdrawn in January 2015.

Freehold Metrolink station, on Cowhill's common border with Werneth on Block Lane, provides direct tram links to Manchester and beyond and to Rochdale Railway Station and town centre. The station was opened in 2012 and was one of several new stations opened along the Oldham and Rochdale Line. Alternative names for the station including Cowhill and Block Lane were considered but rejected by the local council in favour of Freehold.
