= Coalshaw Green =

Coordinates: 53.525532°N 2.1475484°W

- Location within Greater Manchester
- OS grid reference: SD90316 03218
- Metropolitan borough: Oldham
- Metropolitan county: Greater Manchester
- Region: North West
- Country: England
- Sovereign state: United Kingdom
- Post town: OLDHAM
- Postcode district: OL9
- Dialling code: 0161
- Police: Greater Manchester
- Fire: Greater Manchester
- Ambulance: North West
- UK Parliament: Oldham West and Royton

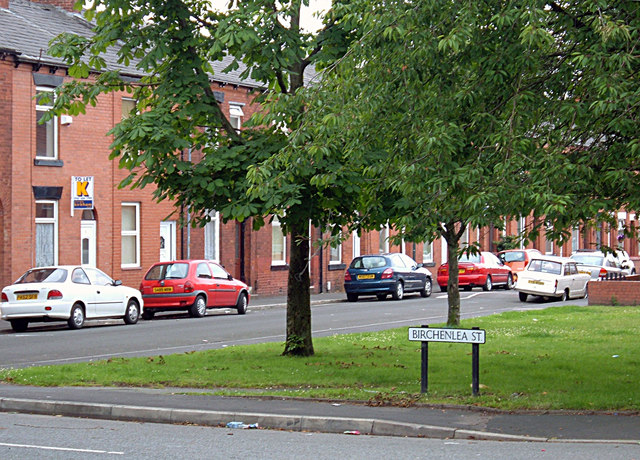
The Junction of Birchenlea Street and Turf Lane adjacent to the original hamlet of Coalshaw Green

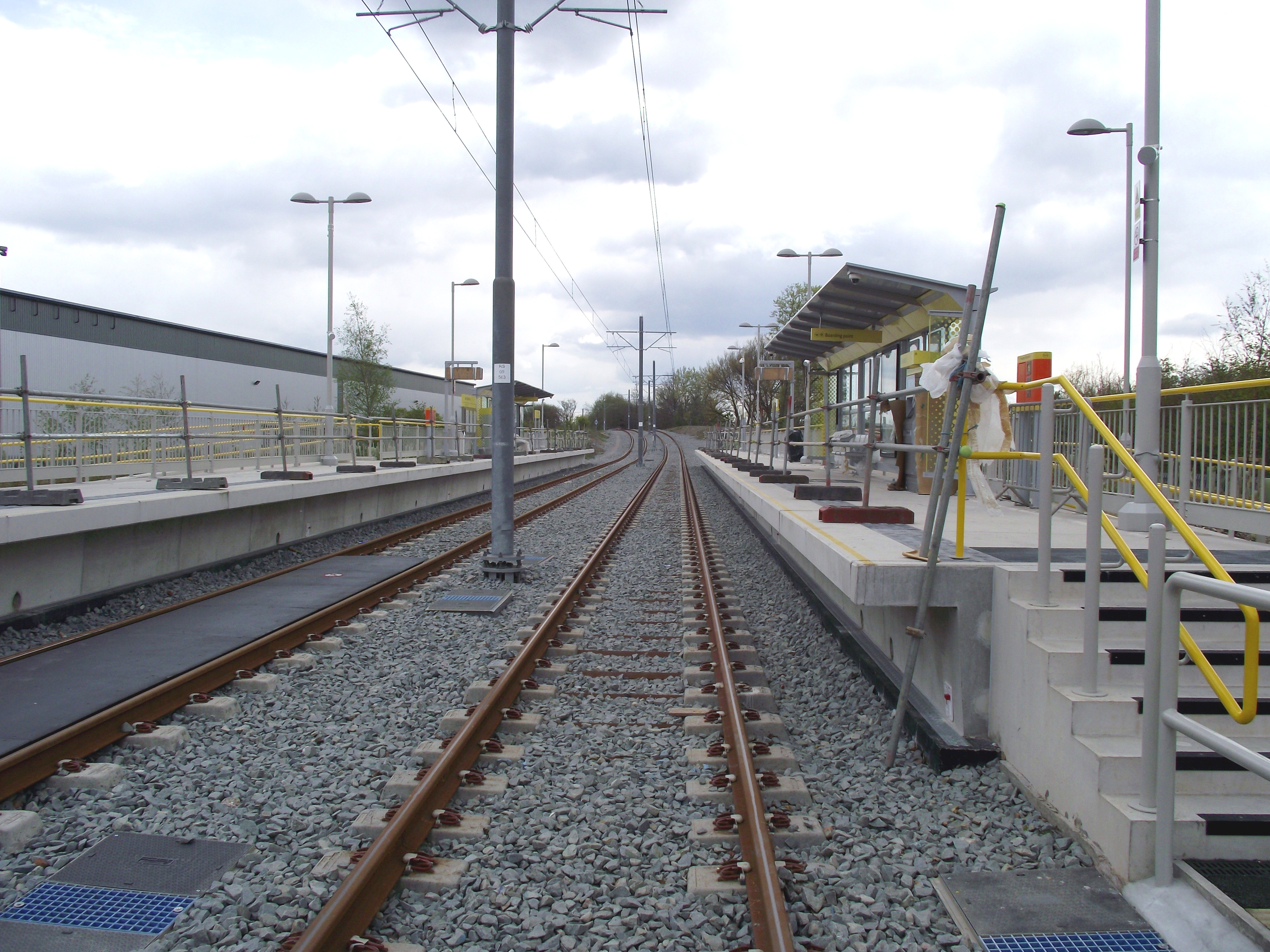
South Chadderton Metrolink Station, Coalshaw Green

Coalshaw Green is a locality in the town of Chadderton in the Metropolitan Borough of Oldham, Greater Manchester.

Lying 1.8 miles south of Chadderton town centre, Coalshaw Green was formerly an archaic hamlet located in the south east of the township around the junction of Turf Lane and Drury Lane, and forms a contiguous urban area with Butler Green, Whitegate and Hollinwood.

Coalshaw Green Park, which opened in 1911, is Chadderton's oldest public park. It comprises a formal park and, until 2017, adjoining playing fields which has now become a suburban housing development.

The Chadderton Cricket & Bowling Club, known locally as 'The Big Cot', is a long-standing social club in the area.

Coalshaw Green is also the location of South Chadderton Metrolink station.

== History ==
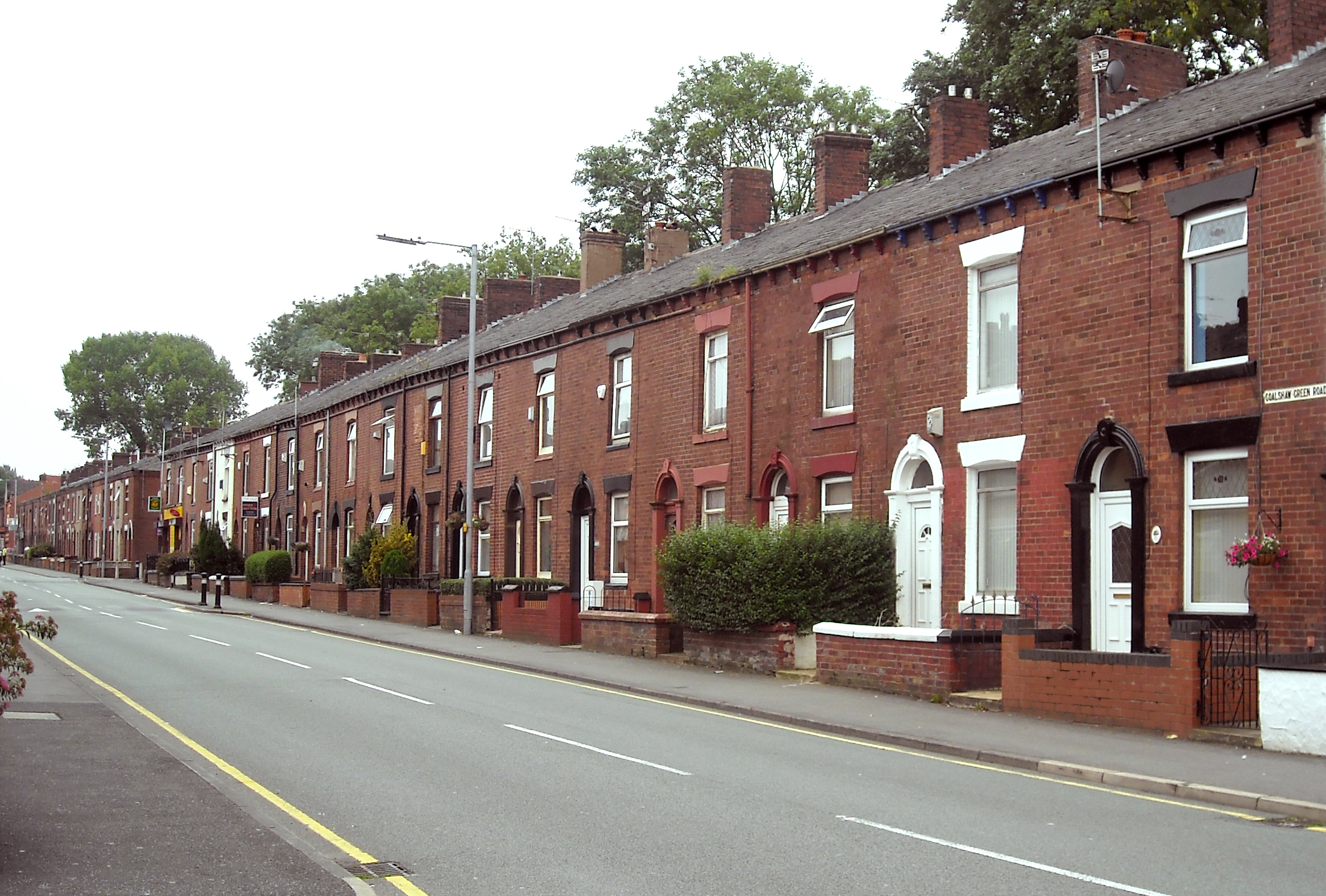
Coalshaw Green Road looking north towards Butler Green.

Archaically known as Coldshaw, Coleshaw and Cauleshaw, Coalshaw Green is mentioned in some of the earliest recorded accounts of the township of Chadderton dating from the early 13th century, when lands in Chadderton including Coalshaw Green (Caule Shaw), were granted to the Stanlaw Abbey religious order by Gilbert de Notton who held the manor of Chadderton and Foxdenton from 1234.

Historical records also mention Coalshaw Green in 1672 when a right of way through 'Coleshaw Lane' was established on payment of a half penny a year.

The growth of the nearby village of Hollinwood from the mid 18th century along the common border of Oldham and Chadderton townships saw development take place along Drury Lane and by the mid 1840s Coalshaw Green effectively lay at the edge of the village. 'Hollinwood, Lancs' was the area's postal address from the late 19th century until the advent of the modern postcode system, when 'Chadderton, Oldham' became the official address.

The late 19th century saw the area expand into a cotton mill district with the construction of the Gordon Mill (1884), Rose Mill (1885) and the Asia Mill (1904) all established within the vicinity (see List of mills in Chadderton). All of these mills have now been demolished. The Rose Mill was destroyed by a major fire in 2007. Coalshaw Green Road, the main thoroughfare through the area, was constructed during this late 19th century period connecting the area to the nearby settlement of Butler Green/Washbrook.

Turf Lane (mentioned in records dating back to the mid 17th century) was originally called Tarve Lane and took its name from its use. It was a lane used by tenants to collect turf or peat for themselves and their manorial overlords. The inhabitants had certain rights of 'turbary' but were required to all use the same road so that they could be supervised in this operation. The turf would be gathered from the Hale Moss area around Whitegate.

Now closed, Drury Lane Council School, located near the junction of Turf Lane and Coalshaw Green, served the area between 1894 and 1954.

== Coalshaw Green Park ==
In December 1908, Chadderton Urban District Council were informed that Miss Marjorie Lees of Werneth Park, Oldham, was offering to give them £3,113 wherewith to purchase a plot of land from the Trustees of C. E. Lees, her late father. This would be a memorial in his honour. The Council, in accepting the gift on behalf of the inhabitants of Chadderton, gave their 'sincere and hearty thanks ... for her most generous offer.' The land, comprising about 11 acres [4.5 hectares] lay between the Werneth to Hollinwood railway line and Coalshaw Green Road, and ran from Stanley Road to the now-demolished Rose Mill. It was to be used as a recreation ground for children and adults for all time, with 'no tipping of refuse to take place there.'

The park was officially opened by Miss Lees, using a gold key, on 25 May 1912 in the presence of Councillor Joseph Hilton, Chairman of the Urban District Council, and other dignitaries. Before the ceremony, a large procession led by Chadderton Brass Band, made its way from Stanley Road School through streets bedecked with flags. Coalshaw Green, the first public recreation ground in Chadderton, was totally renovated in 1998, and was the first of the town's three major parks to receive a Green Flag award. Much of its redevelopment in recent years has been due to the enthusiasm of Barbara Wilson MBE, and her dedicated group of 'Friends' of the park.

March 2015 saw the opening of a skate park in Coalshaw Green Park. Built at a cost of almost £160,000, the skatepark is open to skateboarders, scooters, cyclists and roller skaters and is accessible by able-bodied and disabled skaters. Further improvements including the provision of new tennis and basketball courts were announced in June 2016.

== Coalshaw Green Playing Fields ==
In July 2016 it was announced that the former Rose Mill site was, subject to planning, to be developed for housing. The proposed development, however, ran into local opposition as the site included the Coalshaw Green playing fields. The fields, which adjoined Coalshaw Green Park, had been in continuous use by amateur and school football teams for generations and was considered to be one of the best playing surfaces in the area.

The plans for the 124 property development were subsequently approved by Oldham Council and the project completed.

== Emmanuel Church (Church of England) ==
Now closed, the church was founded in 1910. It was a daughter church of the extensive parish of Christ Church, Block Lane. The church building, which had been empty and unused for a number of years, was demolished in May 2017. The congregation now meet at its daughter church, St Georges Chapel, at nearby Whitegate.

== Turf Lane Methodist Church ==
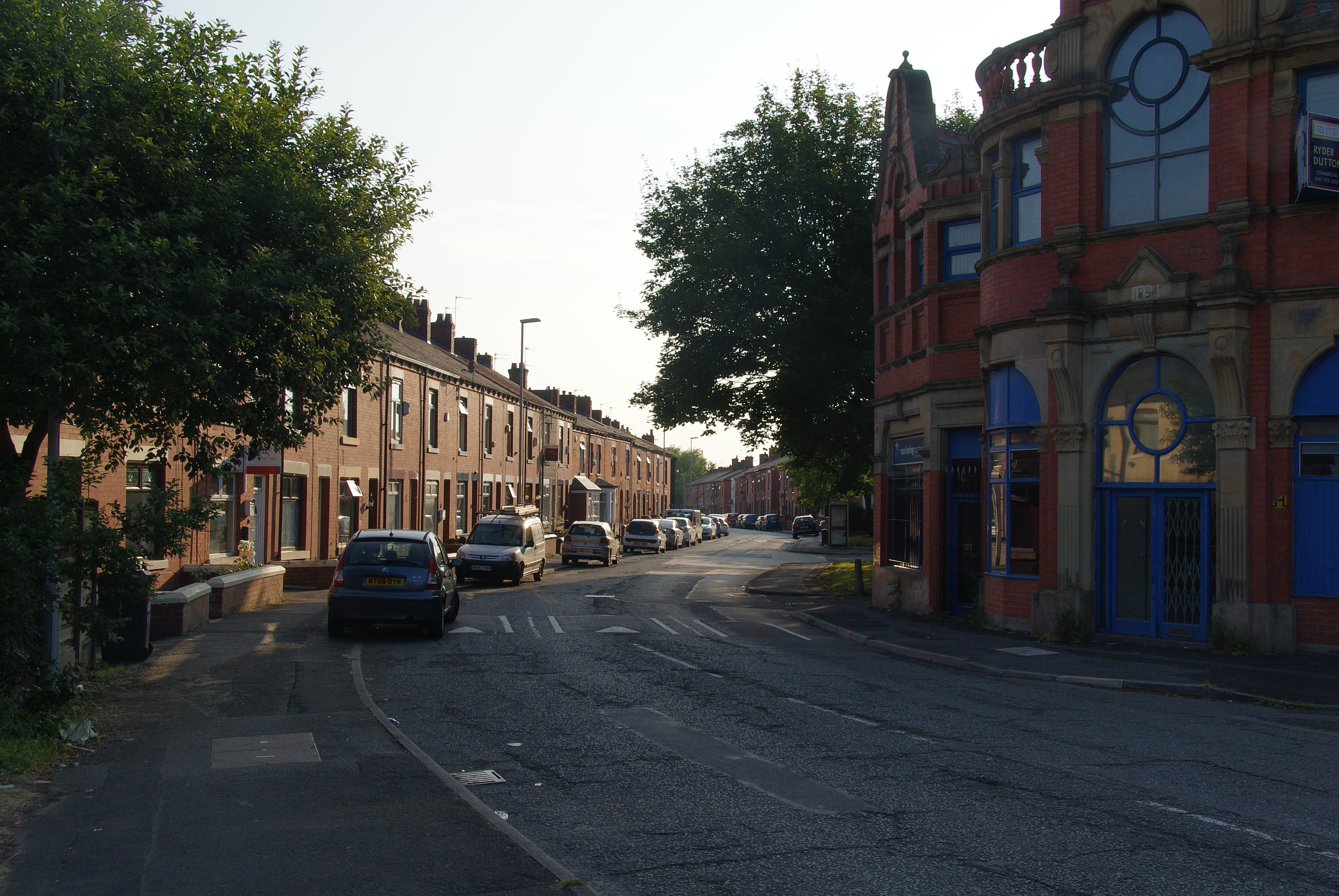
Turf Lane from the Coalshaw Green junction.

The church was established in 1887 by outreach workers from Failsworth Wesleyan Methodist Church to serve the rapidly expanding area of Turf Lane and Coalshaw Green. The church remained active until 1966 when it merged with a number of other local churches to form South Chadderton Methodist Church, located at Butler Green.

== Transport ==
Bee Network operate the following bus services -

81 to Manchester City Centre via Moston and Harpurhey and to Oldham.

South Chadderton tram stop provides tram links to East Didsbury via Manchester and to Rochdale.
