= Cowhill =

Cowhill is the name of several places in the United Kingdom, including:

- Cowhill, Aberdeenshire
- Cowhill, Derbyshire
- Cowhill, Gloucestershire
- Cowhill, Greater Manchester
