= Butler Green =

Coordinates: 53.530468°N 2.1455350°W

- Location within Greater Manchester
- OS grid reference: SD 90450 03767
  - London: Washbrook Primitive Methodist Church in the 1900s
- Metropolitan borough: Oldham
- Metropolitan county: Greater Manchester
- Region: North West
- Country: England
- Sovereign state: United Kingdom
- Post town: OLDHAM
- Postcode district: OL9
- Dialling code: 0161
- Police: Greater Manchester
- Fire: Greater Manchester
- Ambulance: North West
- UK Parliament: Oldham West and Royton

Butler Green is a residential area in the town of Chadderton in the Metropolitan Borough of Oldham, Greater Manchester. The area is also commonly known as Washbrook.

Located in the south east of the town, Butler Green forms a contiguous urban area with Coalshaw Green, Whitegate, Nimble Nook, Block Lane, and Hollinwood.

Hollinwood Rugby League Club are based at Butler Green on Melrose Fields, the site of the former Melrose Mill.

== History ==
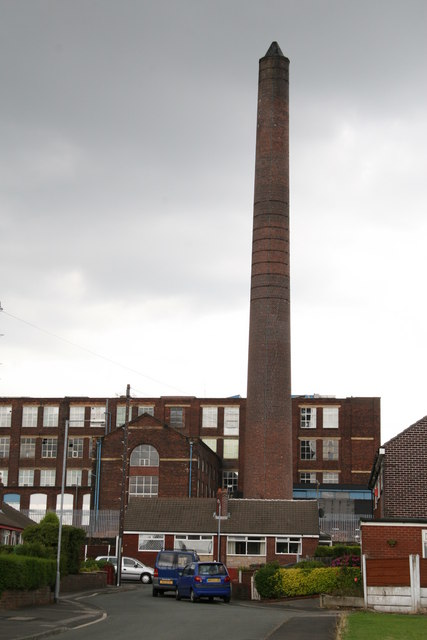
The now demolished Gem Mill, Butler Green

Butler Green and its continuation, Washbrook, form part of the network of ancient roads that linked the hamlets and villages of Chadderton to the manor houses at Foxdenton and Chadderton Hall. In pre-industrial times a hamlet consisting of a number of homesteads and other property lay at the junction of Butler Green and Thompson Lane known as Butler Fold.

Washbrook derives its name from a nearby stream which flows from the higher ground of nearby Werneth. The brook has long since been culverted. The stream becomes the Bower Brook at Hollinwood and is a tributary of Moston Brook

The Washbrook area became a centre of early industrial activity in the late 18th century with the construction in 1792 of the Werneth Branch Canal. The Canal terminated at a basin known as Hollinwood Top Wharf and was a privately built extension of the Hollinwood Branch Canal to facilitate the transportation of coal from the Werneth Collieries to Manchester and other industrial centres. It lay at the intersection of Washbrook and Old Lane.

The New Engine Pit at Old Lane was opened in 1803. By 1875 the local collieries were no longer producing coal and the canal fell into disuse.

In 1876 the northern section of the Werneth Branch Canal was destroyed with the construction of an embankment at Washbrook for the Oldham Loop Line railway which opened in 1880.

A "Primitive Methodist" Society had begun meeting in Butler Green in 1862 in a disused loom house in the wake of what was known as the "cotton famine revival." In 1869 they erected their first building at the corner of Butler Green and Coalshaw Green Road with its three clock faces looking out from its tower across the road junction.

In common with other areas of Chadderton, the late 19th century saw Butler Green expand into a cotton mill district with the construction of Butler Green Mill (1863), Melrose Mill (1869), Spring Mill (1870) and the Gem Mill (1901). These mills have now been demolished and replaced with housing developments. The Nile Mill, lying just north of Butler Green on Fields New Road still survives and is a grade II listed building. See List of mills in Chadderton.

A network of new roads was built during this period - Coalshaw Green Road leading to the hamlet of that name, Stanley Road connecting the area to Manchester Road, Hollinwood and Fields New Road leading to Cowhill through the former Fields Farm. Spencer Street, linking Old Lane to the Top of Hollinwood was also constructed during this period, spawning a major industrial district stretching to Manchester Road. The new roads were a major factor in the urbanisation of the east side of Chadderton, resulting in agglomeration between the former hamlets and villages and the rapidly expanding district of Freehold lying immediately to the north in the Werneth area of Oldham.

Stanley Road School is a long-standing educational establishment first built in 1903 and has been used by a variety of primary and secondary schools since including South Chadderton School and Freehold Community School. For a period up to 1988 it housed Butler Green Primary School before reverting to its original name of Stanley Road.

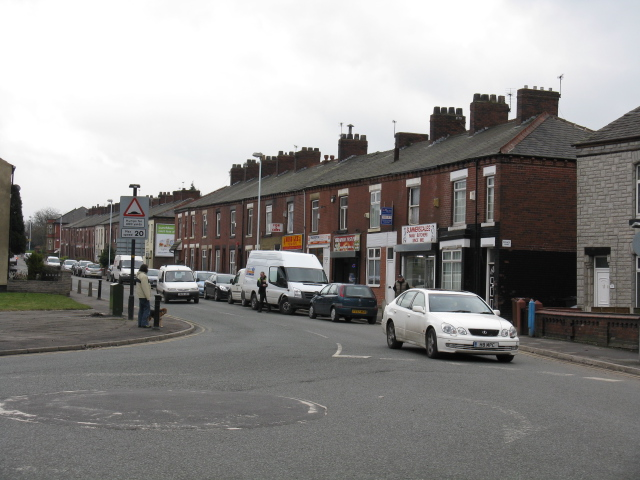
Local shops at Thompson Lane

Butler Green was quite a substantial village until redevelopment took place in the 1970s. A cluster of shops stood at the crossroads whilst Washbrook Methodist Church, with its public clock, formed the focal point for the community. In the post-war period and on into the 1960s shops on Butler Green included Patch the chemist at no. 8, Monaghan the draper's at 10-12, Spence Bros. butcher's at 13, Whittam the baker at 20, Stafford's fish, fruit, flowers and veg at 22, not forgetting the Clock Corner Restaurant and Dyson's undertaker's.

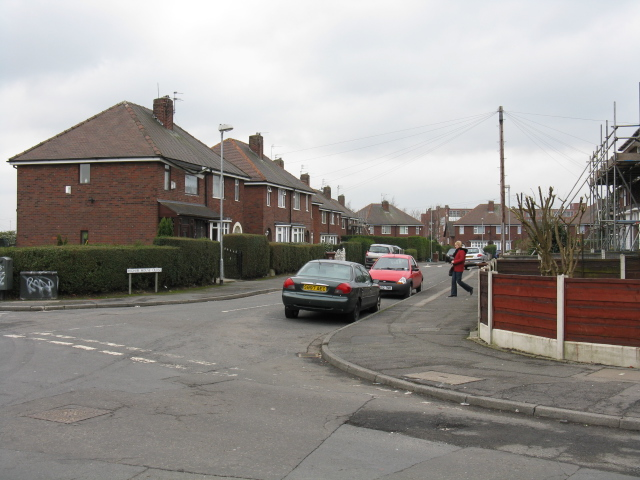
Higher House Close, location of the former Higher House Farm

There are two long standing public houses remaining in the Washbrook area. The Washbrook Tavern, formerly called the Britannia Hotel, which was first licensed in 1868 and the Colliers Arms which dates from around 1803 and the opening of New Engine Colliery. A third public house, The Owd Tatts, still stands but has been closed for a number of years. A long-standing social club, The Hollinwood And Chadderton Garden Social Club, known locally as 'The Little Cot', used to serve the area until its closure and demolition in the early 2010s. Suburban housing has now been built on the site, the development named 'Little Cot Close'.

Butler Green once had its own police station. Located at the junction of Thompson Lane and Butler Green the building was later used as a hostel.

A new parade of shops, including Butler Green sub post office, was built at Butler Green in 1974.

== Religion ==
Since 1870 the area has been a part of the ecclesiastical parish of Christ Church (Church of England), Chadderton, the parish church being on Block Lane. The church had a Mission at Butler Green located at the junction of Wallis Street and Mellor Street until the post-war period.

South Chadderton Methodist Church

The present church at Butler Green came into existence in January 1966, with the amalgamation of four churches, (Cowhill, Eaves Lane, Washbrook and Turf Lane) with members from Edward Street (Werneth) joining following the closure of their church in 1967. The amalgamation came about primarily because of ageing and declining congregations, lack of finance and poor maintenance of the buildings.

Washbrook Church came into being in the autumn and winter of 1861-62 as a result of the outreach by evangelists from the Primitive Methodist church in Bourne Street, Hollinwood.

Accommodation in the form of the Loom House, situated adjacent to the railway bridge on Washbrook, was acquired. This building became too small for the increasing congregation and Sunday school.

A site was acquired at the junction of Washbrook, Coalshaw Green Road and Butler Green and by 1869 a chapel and schoolroom were erected.

The Washbrook church that many people would recognise, complete with clock tower, was opened on 11 March 1893.

The churches that formed the new South Chadderton Methodist church from January 1966 to December 1969, held their meetings in the premises that had been the Washbrook church until the present day church was opened in 1970.

Corpus Christi (Roman Catholic)

A growing Irish population in the south Chadderton and Hollinwood area saw the need for a Catholic church to be established there. The parish, which was formally known as Corpus Christi, Hollinwood, covered an extensive area including most of Hollinwood itself, Hollins, parts of Werneth and a substantial part of south and central Chadderton.

The first effort to set up a chapel came through Fr. John Baste in 1877. Two small cottages in Maple Street, Hollinwood were rented and a poorly furnished chapel received the few Catholics.

The Rev. C. Muller took charge and was helped by Dean Brindle to buy land in Old Lane, Chadderton and to build a school-chapel. This was opened in 1878 by Canon Sheehan, Vicar-General.

Fr. Thos. Walsh was there from 1879 to 1888, and built the presbytery.

Fr. B. Flynn was forced to raise funds to enlarge the schools. and this new school-chapel was opened in 1903.

The current church building was built in 1933.

In July 2016 it was announced that, due to dwindling congregations and a shortage of priests, Corpus Christi church may close under plans to amalgamate a number of parishes in the Oldham area. Corpus Christi was subsequently reprieved and now forms part of the new Parish of Divine Mercy, Chadderton and Hollinwood.

== Transport ==
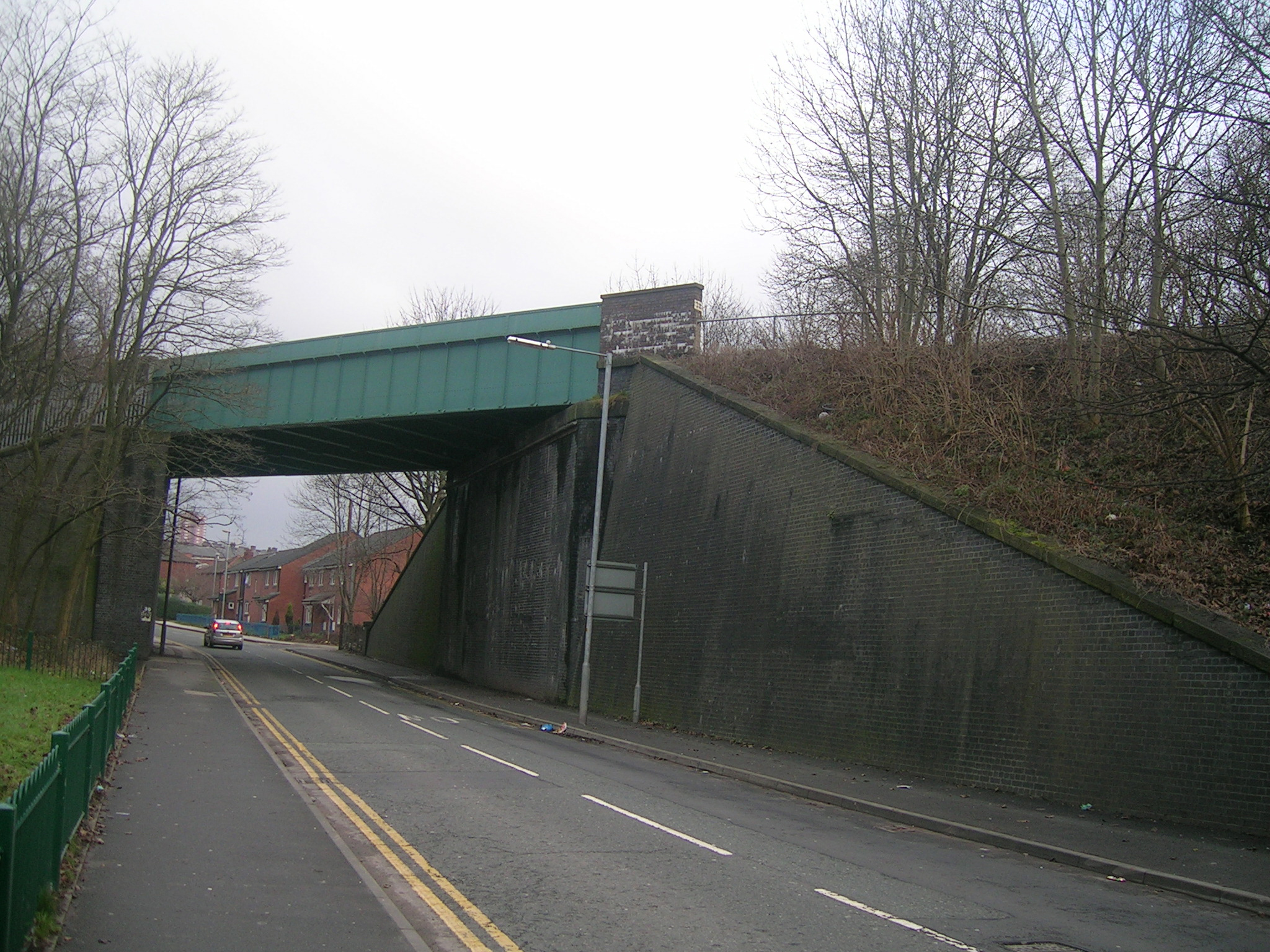
Washbrook railway bridge

Bee Network operate the following bus services -

81 to Manchester City Centre via Moston and Harpurhey and to Oldham.

Service 415 to Oldham and to Middleton via Alkrington.

Service 159 provides links to Oldham via Chadderton town centre and to Middleton via Hollinwood, Woodhouses, Failsworth and New Moston.
