= Hartford Mill =

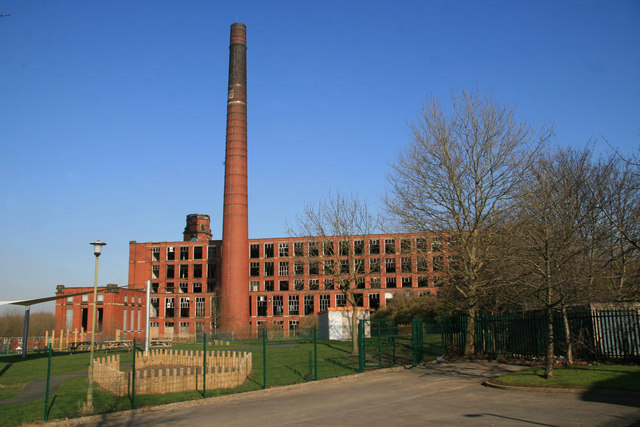
- Interactive map of Hartford Mill

General information
- Coordinates: 53.537354°N 2.135546°W

Hartford Mill was a Grade II-listed building located off Block Lane, in the Freehold area of Oldham, UK.

== History ==
It was constructed as a cotton-spinning mill in 1907. Frederick Whittaker Dixon designed it for the Hartford Mill (Oldham) Company Ltd. It was extended in 1920 and 1924. It was Grade II-listed on 8 March 1993. In 1991, Littlewoods vacated the building, and it has been unoccupied since then. A fire significantly damaged it in 2014, and a teenager died after falling through the roof of the building in 2015. It was proposed for demolition in 2018. Demolition of the mill was due to be completed in August 2020 but was interrupted by the COVID-19 pandemic. Demolition restarted in July 2021 and the last remaining structure, the mill chimney, was demolished on 1 October 2023.
