= Freehold, Greater Manchester =

Coordinates: 53.534326°N 2.13531°W

Freehold
- Location within Greater Manchester
- OS grid reference: SD911041
- Metropolitan borough: Oldham
- Metropolitan county: Greater Manchester
- Region: North West
- Country: England
- Sovereign state: United Kingdom
- Post town: OLDHAM
- Postcode district: OL9
- Dialling code: 0161
- Police: Greater Manchester
- Fire: Greater Manchester
- Ambulance: North West
- UK Parliament: Oldham West and Royton

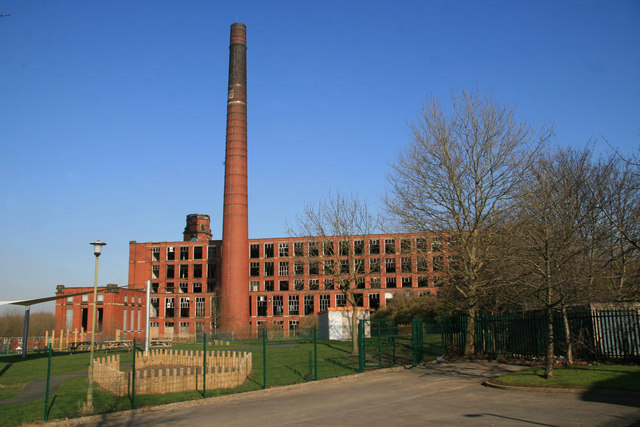
The derelict Hartford Mill (which has now since been demolished) is shown in this picture, taken from Freehold Community Primary Academy.

Freehold is an urban area of Werneth in Oldham, Greater Manchester, England. It occupies an area in the west of Werneth along the Oldham township boundary with Chadderton. It is contiguous on all sides with other urban areas, including parts of Werneth to the north and east, and Cowhill, Block Lane, and Butler Green/Washbrook in Chadderton.

Freehold is centred on Oxford Street and is broadly bounded by Manchester Road, Edward Street, the former Oldham Loop Line railway, Block Lane, and Suffolk Street.

The area was redeveloped, to some extent, as part of the government's Housing Market Renewal Initiative – the Werneth Freehold Masterplan – comprising Freehold, Block Lane, and some small adjacent parts of north Werneth and south Chadderton. However, some parts of Freehold have remained derelict since the early 2000s following loss of funding for the initiative.

Freehold tram stop opened in 2012 at the Oldham/Chadderton boundary at Block Lane, and serves both the Freehold area of Oldham and the Cowhill/Block Lane areas of Chadderton. The station's position on the boundary means it lies partially in both Chadderton and Oldham.

== History ==
In the early 1860s, John Platt (MP), the son of Henry Platt who founded Platt Brothers textile machinery manufacturers in 1770, purchased the land now known as Freehold from the Lees family, incumbents of the manorial Werneth Hall. Platt, at that time Mayor of Oldham, commenced a programme of house building, enabling workers of Platts and other local manufacturers to become forty-shilling freeholders, thus giving the workers the right to vote. Platt Bros were for a time the largest manufacturers of machinery for the cotton industry in the world, employing some 15,000 people.

A footpath linking Manchester Road with the ancient road of Block Lane was built up to become Oxford Street. The opening of Oxford Street led to the construction of numerous side streets linking to Manchester Road and Block Lane, and by 1914 the area was entirely filled with rows of terraced housing.

Freehold once had a number of public houses, all of which have now closed. The Royal Oak, on Manchester Road, which opened in 1825 was the last surviving pub in Werneth when it closed in 2023. The district also had its own cinema: The Gem Cinema, on Suffolk Street, which opened in 1920. The cinema closed down in the early 1960s and it later became a cabaret club, known as the Consul Club, which had limited success. By the early 2000s, the building was occupied by a soft furnishing company, but it had been demolished by 2009 and the site was cleared for housing development.

The now demolished Hartford Mill was a Grade II listed building in the area, dating from 1907. After cotton production ceased in 1969, the mill was abandoned and fell into dereliction; an application to have the building de-listed and demolished was approved by the owners and the local authority in 2015. Another Grade II listed building located in the Freehold area is Werneth Lodge, a former coach house dating from c. 1790, now used as a private residential care home.

Freehold Community School was built in 1982 on the site of Blackridings Mill, which was demolished in 1975. The school has a history dating to 1880, having been originally located on Derby Street close to the junction with Manchester Road. The school also used the Stanley Road School building in the Butler Green area for a period up until the construction of the new school.

== Religion ==
Freehold is part of the parish of Christ Church (Church of England), Block Lane. Christ Church was built in 1870 and remains an active Anglican church with many community projects in addition to its primary school well into the 21st century.

Freehold's increasing population in the mid 19th century saw Cowhill Methodist Church expand its ministry into this area and a decision was made to build a chapel in Rutland Street, Werneth, half a mile away from Cowhill, and in 1861 the foundations were laid for one of the largest churches in Oldham, Brunswick Wesleyan Methodist church which opened in 1862. The church closed in 1954. Cowhill became prolific at building churches. Two more building projects including a new school for Brunswick, on Oxford Street, opened in January 1890.

The congregation moved to Edward Street Methodist Church (500 yards from Rutland Street) which itself dates back to 1861. That church closed in 1967 when it amalgamated with several other local churches, including Cowhill Methodist Church, to form South Chadderton Methodist Church at Butler Green.

Freehold is home to a large Muslim population and three mosques serve the area, the Werneth Jamia Masjid, Manchester Road, the Markazi Mosque (capacity 1,600), Suffolk Street and Jamia Islamia Ghausia Mosque on Warwick Street.

Werneth Jamia Masjid was the first masjid to be established in the Werneth area of Oldham. The building was previously used as a grocery store and was purchased in 1976 to be converted into a much needed place of worship. The local community helped raise the £7,200 required to purchase the property through donations.

== Transport ==
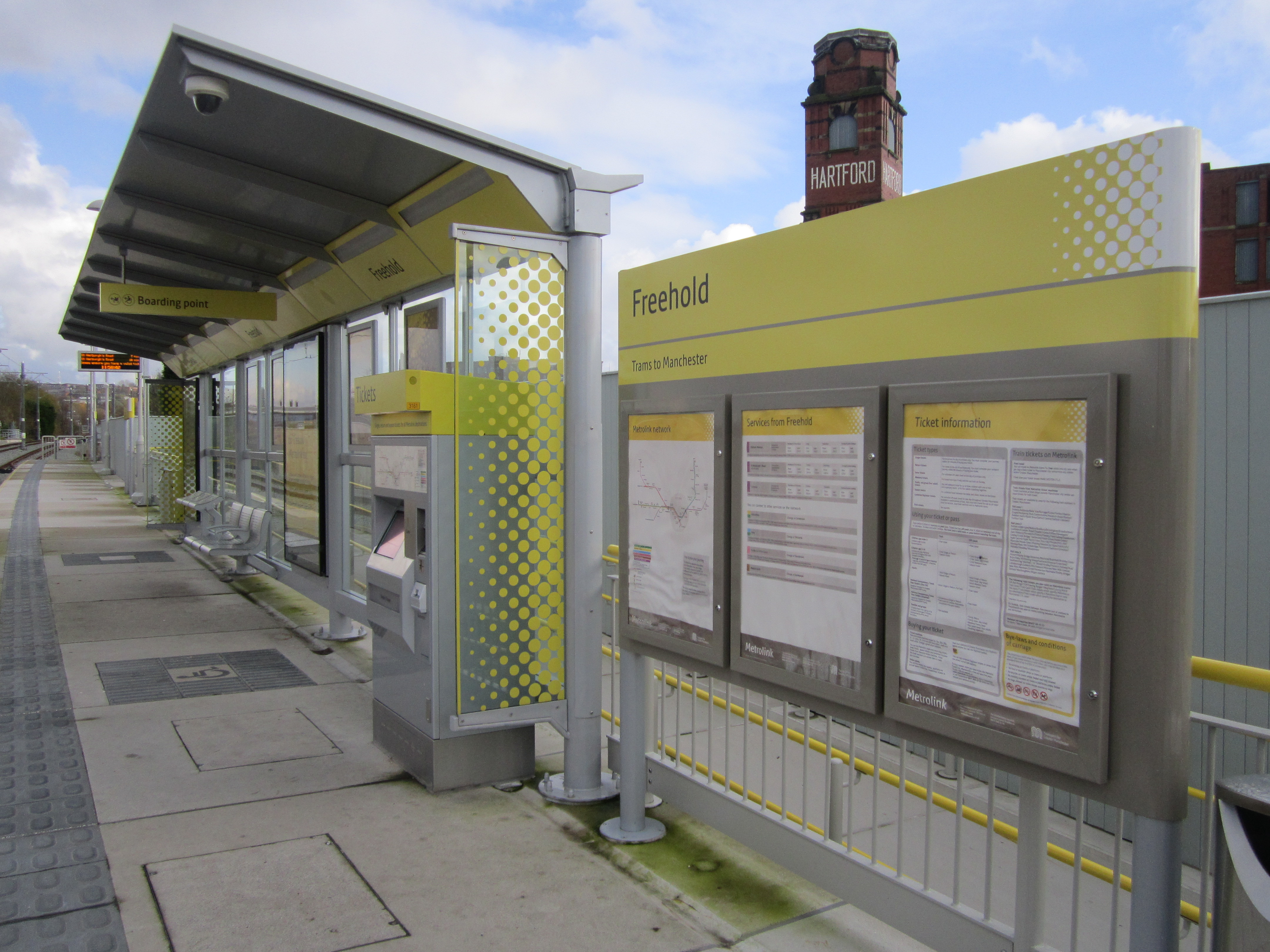
Freehold Metrolink Station

Bee Network operate the following bus services in the Freehold area -

81 and 83 linking Freehold with Oldham town centre and with Manchester City centre, via Moston and Failsworth.

159 to Oldham via Chadderton town centre and to Middleton via Hollinwood, Woodhouses, Failsworth and New Moston.

396 providing links to Ashton-U-Lyne and to Middleton via Chadderton town centre.

Freehold tram stop provides direct tram links to East Didsbury via Manchester Victoria and to Rochdale railway station and town centre.
