= Samuel Collins (1802–1878) =

English poet and radical

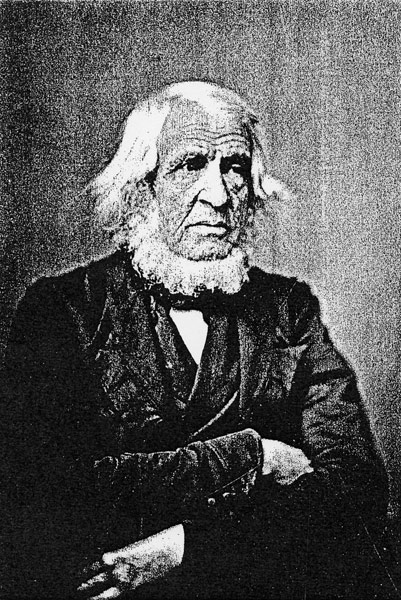
- Born: 1 December 1802; Hollinwood, England
- Died: 8 July 1878 (aged 75); Hale Moss, England
- Occupations: Poet and radical

Samuel Collins (1 December 1802 – 8 July 1878), known as the Bard of Hale Moss, was an English poet and radical.

== Biography ==
Collins was the son of a hand-loom weaver. He was born on 1 December 1802 at Hollinwood, near Manchester. He was put to work when very young, before he had gained more education than a knowledge of his letters. While still in his teens he became an ardent follower of Henry Hunt and William Cobbett, and shared in the Peterloo Massacre in 1819. Afterwards, when chartism was rife, he joined a local radical association, and gave the aid of his pen and tongue on behalf of the reform movement. He suffered for a time some obloquy by his temerity in denouncing Feargus O'Connor's land scheme. He wrote homely verses, some of them in the Lancashire dialect, which were collected in 1859 in a small volume entitled "Miscellaneous Poems and Songs," with a biographical notice by Benjamin Brierley. Collins, who worked at his loom almost to the last, died at Hale Moss, Chadderton, near Manchester, on 8 July 1878.
