= Joseph Aston =

18th- and 19th-century English writer and journalist

Joseph Aston (1762 – 19 October 1844) was an English journalist, dramatist, and miscellaneous writer.

== Life ==
He was the son of William Aston (died 1826), gunsmith, of Deansgate, in Manchester from 1770; by 1811 William Aston & Son were gunsmiths at 53 King's Street. In October 1790 Joseph Aston married Elizabeth Preston, also of Manchester. In 1803 he opened a stationer's shop at 84 Deansgate, where on 1 January 1805 he issued the prospectus of the Manchester Mail, published at sixpence and professing "no political creed". From 1809 till 1825 he was publisher and editor of a conservative journal, the Manchester Exchange Herald. Afterwards he moved to Rochdale, where he started the Rochdale Recorder and then retired to live at Chadderton Hall. He died at Chadderton Hall on 19 October 1844, and was buried at Tonge, adjoining Middleton. Aston was the friend and executor of Thomas Barritt, the antiquary. For about 34 years he also enjoyed the closest intimacy with James Montgomery, the poet and editor of the Sheffield Iris, who submitted to him most of his manuscripts for revision and criticism. In Aston's youth his political views were Liberal and favoured reform, but in later life he wrote in a Conservative spirit. His wife, by whom he had children including a daughter, survived him; she died 20 July 1852.

He himself was a facile writer of verses, the majority of which appeared in his own paper. Of his dramatic pieces, Conscience, a comedy, was performed at the Theatre Royal, Manchester, in 1815, with moderate success; and he also wrote Retributive Justice, a tragedy, and A Family Story, a comedy.

== Works ==
His published works nearly all relate to Manchester. They include The Manchester Guide: a brief historical description of the towns of Manchester & Salford, 1804, 2nd edition, 1815, 3rd, with plates, 1826; History and Description of the Collegiate Church of Christ, Manchester; Lancashire Gazetteer, 1st edition 1808, 2nd, 1822; An Heroic Epistle from the Quadruple Obelisk in the Market Place to the New Exchange, 1809; A Descriptive Account of Manchester Exchange, 1810; A Picture of Manchester 1816 (facsimile reprint of 1st ed., Manchester: Joseph Aston, 1816: Manchester: Morten, 1969 ISBN 0901598011); Metrical Records of Manchester, in which its History is traced (currente calamo) from the days of the ancient Britons to the present time, 1822.

Richard Wright Procter enumerates Aston's "newspapers, books, and plays" but omits "his pamphlets and reprints on local history" as being too numerous in chapter XIII, Literary Deansgate of his Memorials of Manchester Streets.
