= Nimble Nook =

Coordinates: 53.535412°N 2.1512790°W

- Location within Greater Manchester
- OS grid reference: SD 90071 04317
- Metropolitan borough: Oldham
- Metropolitan county: Greater Manchester
- Region: North West
- Country: England
- Sovereign state: United Kingdom
- Post town: OLDHAM
- Postcode district: OL9
- Dialling code: 0161
- Police: Greater Manchester
- Fire: Greater Manchester
- Ambulance: North West
- UK Parliament: Oldham West and Royton

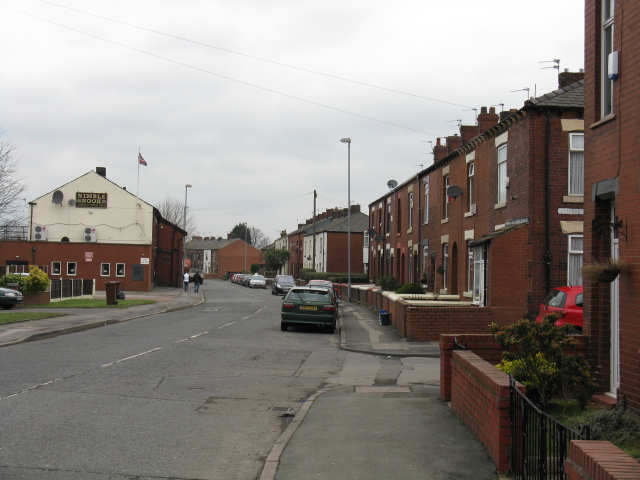
Terraced houses on Foxdenton Lane with Nimble Nook Club to the left

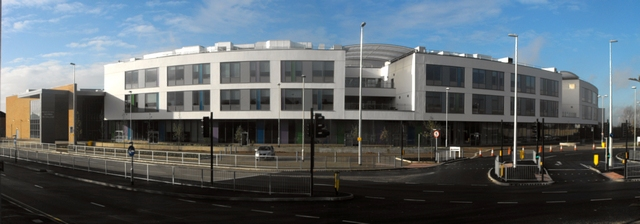
Newman College close to completion in 2012

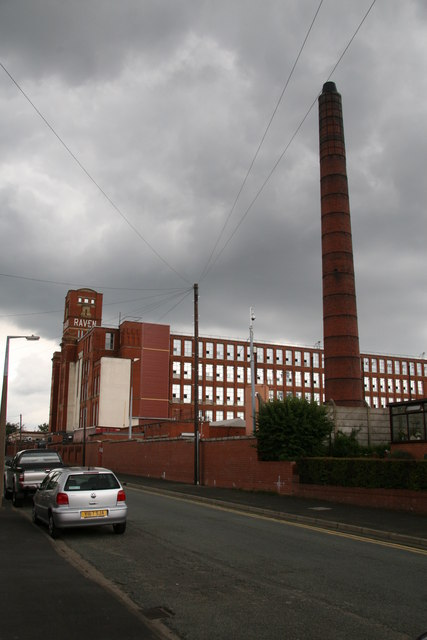
Raven Mll, Chadderton

Nimble Nook is a locality in the town of Chadderton in the Metropolitan Borough of Oldham, Greater Manchester.

Nimble Nook lies 1.3 miles south west of Chadderton's modern commercial centre on Middleton Road and is located around the junction of Denton Lane and Foxdenton Lane. The arterial road Broadway (A663), constructed in 1925, bisects the area from north to south.

Nimble Nook is contiguous with other areas of Chadderton - Butler Green, Whitegate and Cowhill with semi-rural Foxdenton to the west.

== History ==
Records mentioning Thatch Leach, an area of former wetlands in the district, date from the 13th century when lands in the area were granted to the Stanlaw Abbey religious order. The name Thatch Leach survives as a street name in the area. Matthew Fold, a farmstead in the area, is mentioned in records dating to 1691.

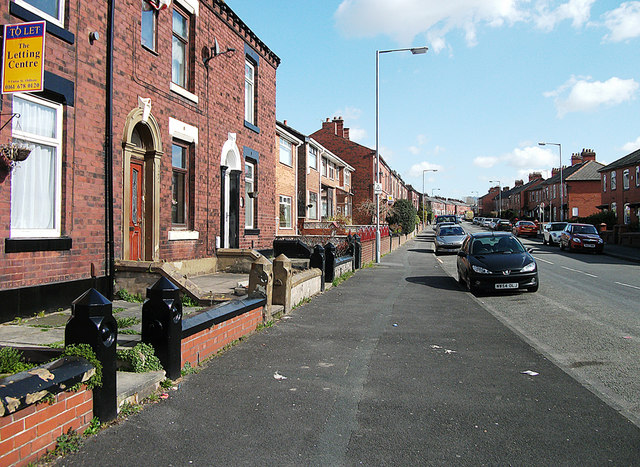
Denton Lane

The mid to late 18th century saw the emergence of a small village at Nimble Nook. A former farmhouse became one of Chadderton's earliest public houses. The Sportsman, which was first licensed in 1794, survives to the present day.

In 1825 the author and local historian James Butterworth described "a place called Nimble-Nook, a public house, and several ranges of brick cottages, constitute this place."

Formerly Nimble Nook Working Men's Club — Nimble Nook Sports & Social Club was formed in 1878. The club moved in 1910 to its current address of Foxdenton Lane. In 2018, the club was given local authority consent to demolish and rebuild the social club, and construct six houses on part of the site.

== Education ==
The Kingfisher Community Special School is located in this district as is the Blessed John Henry Newman RC College, the main Catholic secondary school for the wider Metropolitan Borough of Oldham area. The school occupies the site of the former Chadderton Grammar School.

An infants and junior school, Eaves Lane Council School, served the area from 1921 when it took pupils from Denton Lane School. The school closed in 1970 and its pupils transferred to Christ Church School.

== Religion ==
St Saviours, a daughter church of the extensive Parish of Christ Church, served Nimble Nook from 1910 to 1985 when a new church was built at Bishopgate St half a mile away.

The area was also served by Eaves Lane Wesleyan Methodist Church. Founded in 1914, the church closed in 1966 when it merged with other local churches to form South Chadderton Methodist Church in neighbouring Butler Green.

== Transport ==
Bee Network operate the following bus services -

181/182 to Manchester City Centre via New Moston and Newton Heath and to Shaw via Chadderton and Royton.

Service 415 to Oldham via Cowhill and to Middleton via Alkrington.
