= Whitegate, Greater Manchester =

Coordinates: 53.528058°N 2.1595430°W

Whitegate
- Location within Greater Manchester
- Metropolitan borough: Oldham
- Metropolitan county: Greater Manchester
- Region: North West
- Country: England
- Sovereign state: United Kingdom
- Post town: OLDHAM
- Postcode district: OL9
- Dialling code: 0161
- Police: Greater Manchester
- Fire: Greater Manchester
- Ambulance: North West
- UK Parliament: Oldham West and Royton

Whitegate is an industrial and residential district of the town of Chadderton in the Metropolitan Borough of Oldham, Greater Manchester, England.

Lying along the course of the Rochdale Canal, Whitegate is located in the south of Chadderton, contiguous with the Nimble Nook, Butler Green, Coalshaw Green and Hollinwood areas of the town and New Moston in the City of Manchester which lies to the south. Whitegate is bisected from east to west by the M60 motorway with a junction (21) at the A663 (Broadway) which bisects the area from north to south, close to the Boat And Horses public house.

A small recreation ground, Princess Park, serves the area. Its facilities include a multi purpose games area and children's playground.

Oldham Broadway Business Park is located in this district, lying alongside the Rochdale Canal through the Slacks Valley between Whitegate and Middleton Junction.

== Education ==
Two primary schools serve the area, Yew Tree Community School and Whitegate End School and Infants.

A secondary school, The Collective Spirit Free School (CSFS) opened in September 2013. The Department of Education, however, closed the school in July 2017 after it was classed as failing and placed in special measures by the education watchdog Ofsted.

The school site was previously occupied by the area's long-standing secondary school, South Chadderton School which has relocated to neighbouring Hollinwood following amalgamation with the Kaskenmoor School and is now known as Oasis Academy Oldham.

Prior to 1964, the area around Whitegate End was served by Butterworth Lane County Primary School.

== History ==
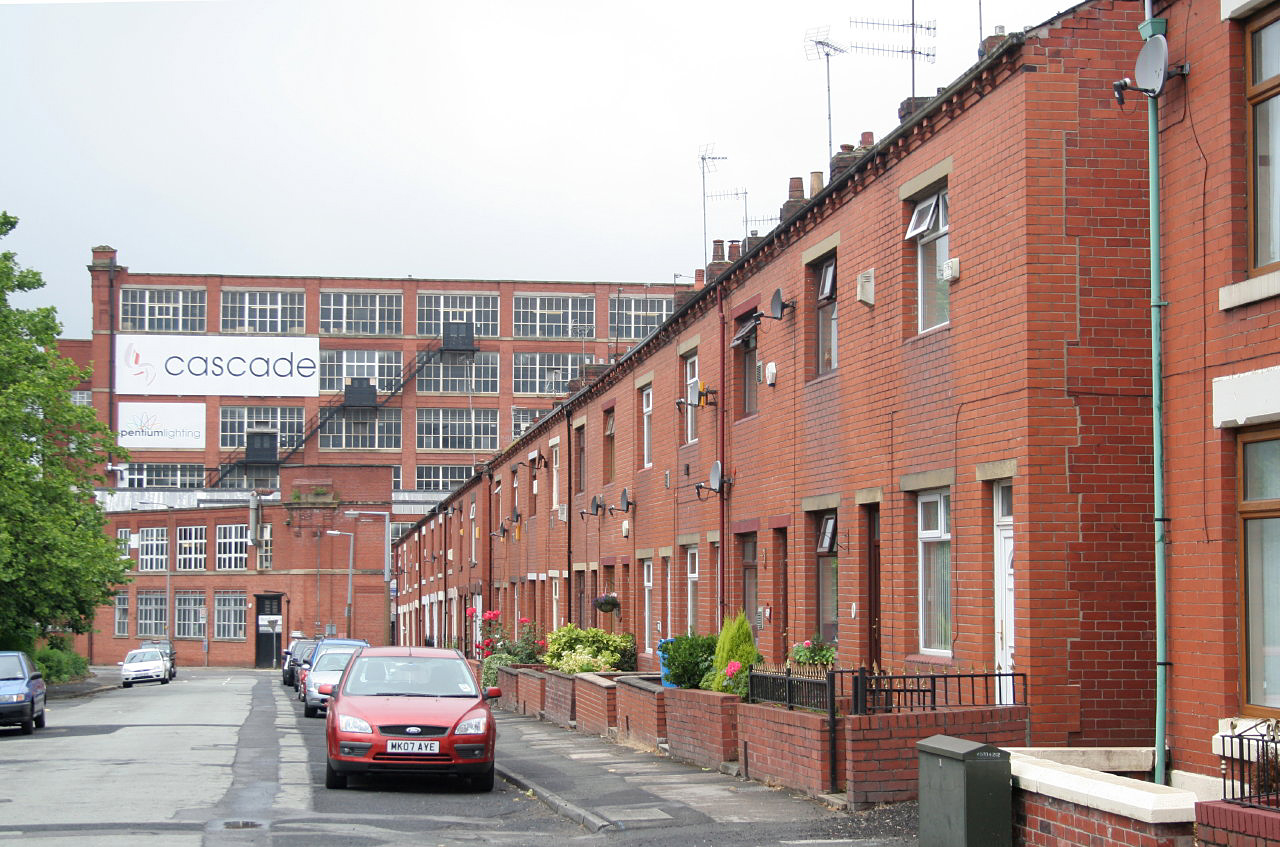
Whitegate Lane

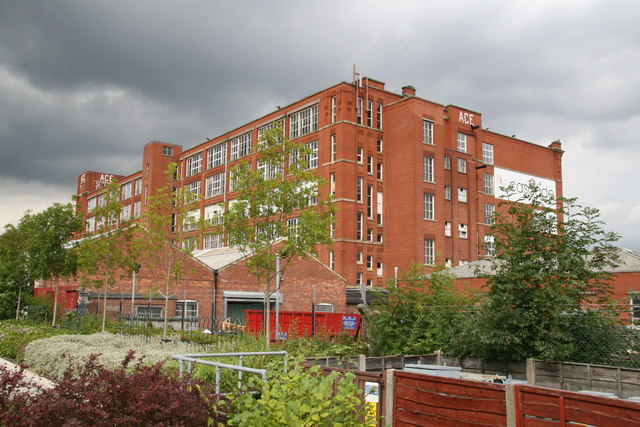
Ace Mill

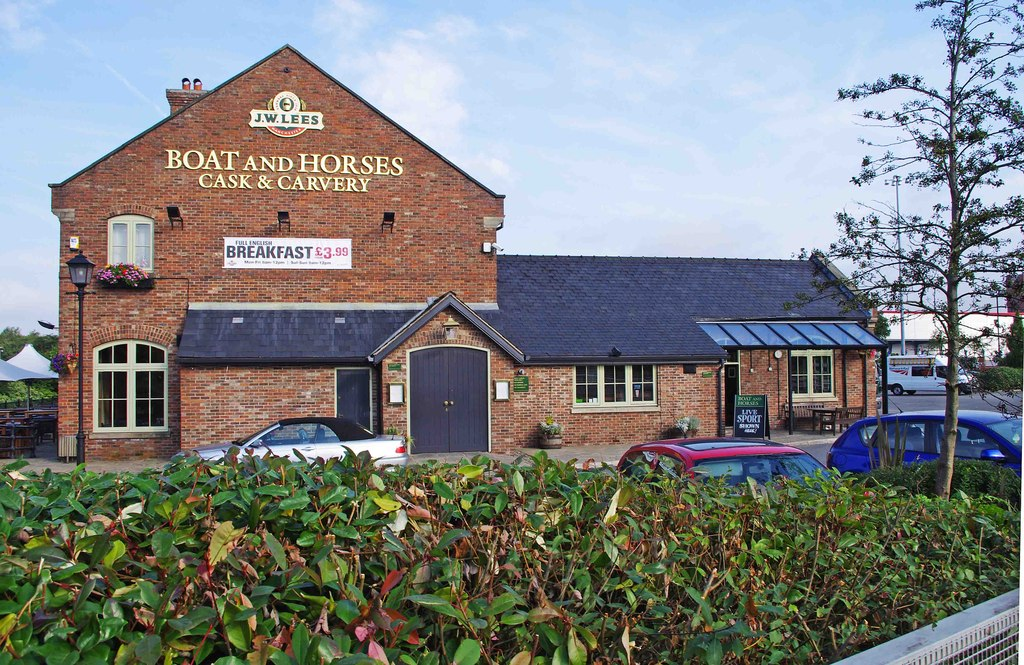
The Boat And Horses

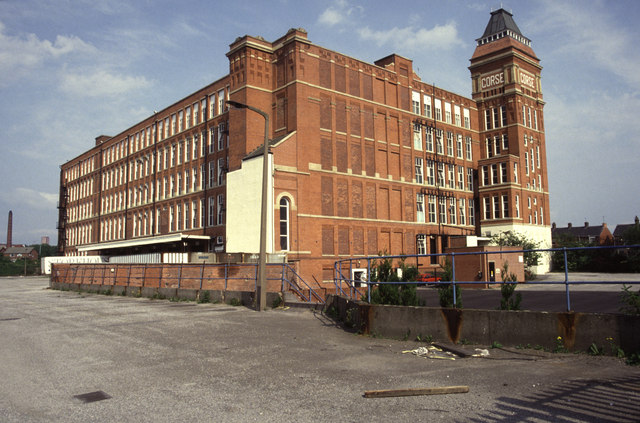
Gorse Mill

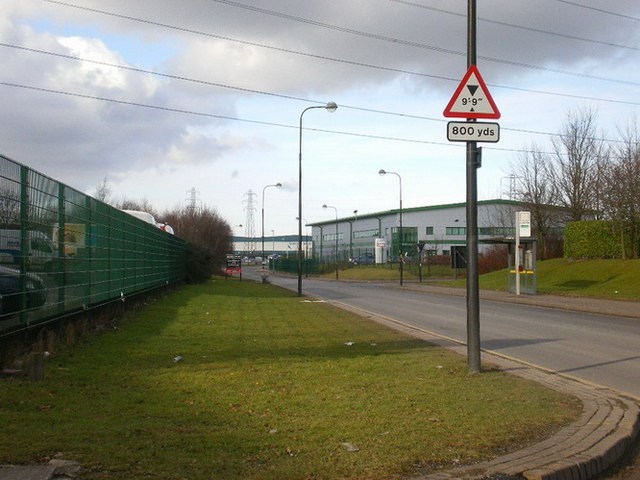
Broadway Business Park

Whitegate is located in what was previously an isolated rural part of Chadderton archaically known as Hale Moss, which was an extensive common lying between Hollinwood and White Moss in the south of the township. During the Middle Ages much of this area was a constituent part of the archaic district known as Theale Moor ('The Hale Moor'), which extended into the township of Moston to the south.

Records mentioning Whitegate date from 1556.

1801 saw the opening of the Rochdale Canal through Whitegate. The stretch of the canal through Slacks Valley was one of the most difficult sections to build as it had to cross two streams. Work at Slacks Valley actually began in 1795 but it took six years to overcome the problems there.

1750 saw the opening of the Boat And Horses public house, making this Chadderton's oldest licensed premises, a distinction shared with the Dog inn at Cowhill. In its early years the pub was known as The Crown. During the Rochdale Canal's construction, a new inn had been built alongside, together with a wharf and small warehouse. It was given the name the Pleasure Boat Inn, but was also known as the Boat House for a few years, until in 1826 it received its present name. The construction of the M60 motorway in the late 1990s, caused substantial damage to the foundations of the Boat and Horses and it had to be completely rebuilt. During this work, a travel lodge was added to the scheme, which also included a restaurant and pleasant canal side terrace.

The author and local historian James Butterworth, writing in 1817 described Whitegate End as 'a noted ancient residence, lying near to the boundary of the township west'. Although now partly hidden among twentieth century housing, the farmhouse of Owler Lane Farm still stands and is believed to date back to 1700.

The early part of the 20th century saw the growth of a substantial cotton mill district at Whitegate, with the Gorse, Rugby, Ram and Ace mills all built between 1907 and 1913. All of the mills survive with the exception of the Rugby which was demolished in January 2014.

The arterial road Broadway (A633) was constructed in 1925. The same year also saw the construction of the first Chadderton Power Station built in the Slacks Valley close to Whitegate. Hollinwood Avenue (A6104) was also constructed during this period.

1933 saw exchanges of land between Chadderton Urban District and Manchester City Council (18 acres) in the Whitegate and New Moston area. Land lying between Owler Lane and the railway line was transferred to Chadderton with a similar sized area lying south of Hollinwood Avenue being transferred to Manchester.

The Whitegate public house opened in 1937 at the junction of Broadway and Hollinwood Avenue.

South Chadderton (later Broadway) Library opened in 1953 in commemoration of the Coronation of Queen Elizabeth II but the library was closed and subsequently demolished in 2009 following an unsuccessful campaign to have the building listed.

Yew Tree Junior and Infants Schools opened in 1954 on the site of the former Yew Tree Farm. The main farm house still stands just off Long Lane, having been converted into a residential home for the elderly. The area's sub post office, named Whitegate, was closed down as part of the Post Office's restructuring of services during 2008/9.

== Moston Park ==
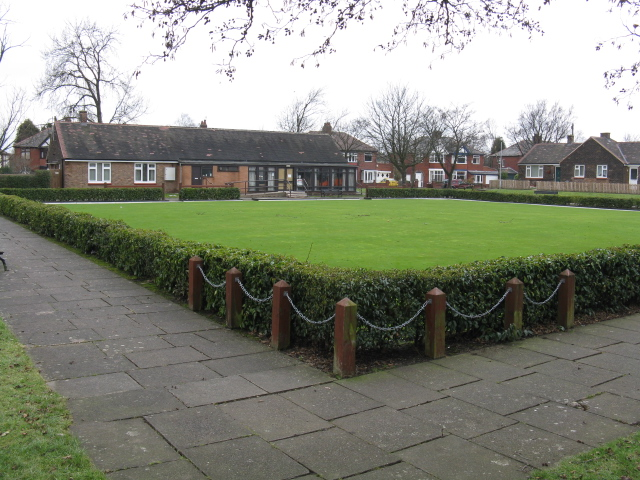
Bowling Green at St George's Square, site of the former Moston Park

Moston Park was a late 19th-century sports and recreation ground situated off Mough Lane and Owler Lane. St Georges's Square now stands in this area.

It was owned by a James Taylor and was used for horse racing, dog racing, wrestling, rabbit coursing and other events and was popular with Manchester residents due to its close proximity to Moston railway station.

A hotel and occasional public house, The Railway Hotel, served the park. The hotel was located on the corner of Owler Lane and what is now Hollinwood Avenue.

The park and hotel were not universally popular in the district.

In 1878, when opposing the application for a beer licence for The Railway Hotel, the rector of Moston, the Rev Thomas Wostencroft, stated that 'Frequenters of Moston Park were a rough lot and it was not fit for any female or even for respectable men to travel in third class carriages on the railway from Moston when there was anything special going on at the grounds kept by Mr Taylor. It was feared that, if he got his way, Moston Park would become like Belle Vue'.

== St George's Church ==
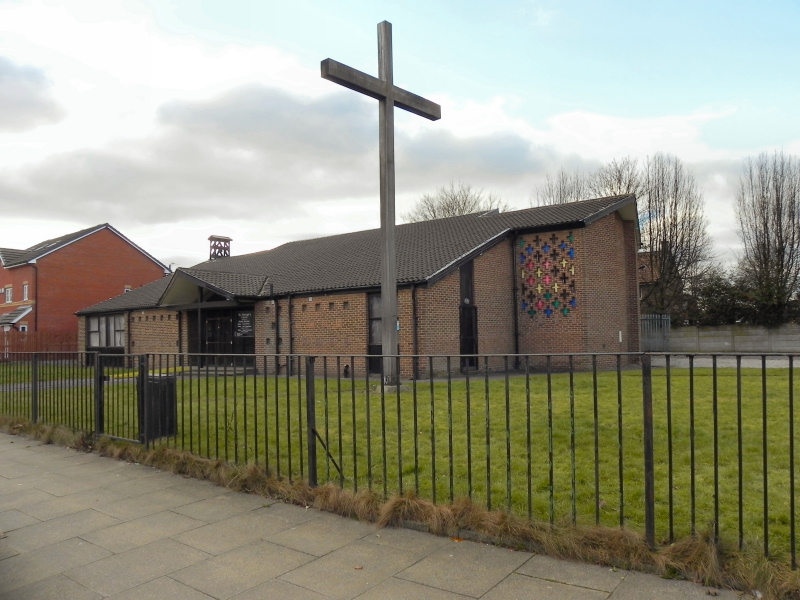
St Georges Church

St George's was originally built as a daughter church to the Emmanuel Parish Church at Chestnut Street in the Coalshaw Green area which was consecrated in 1911.

A growing population and new post war housing around Whitegate End saw the need for a daughter church to be planted there, on the site of what had come to be known as the 'hut'.

The foundation stone for St George's was laid on Whit Sunday 9 June 1957, and opened on 27 April 1958 by the Bishop of Middleton.

St George's became Chadderton's newest parish in October 2014.

The church was consecrated by Mark Davies, Bishop of Middleton, 57 years after the foundation stone was laid.

The M60 split the parish, and St George's took on greater significance, eventually superseding its closed parent church which was subsequently demolished in May 2017.

== Boundary dispute ==
Throughout the Tudor period from the time of Henry VII to the close of Elizabeth's reign, a violent dispute was waged locally between the manorial lords of Chadderton, Foxdenton and Werneth on one hand and the incumbent of Nuthurst Manor (Moston) on the other. It all concerned the rights of pasturage on the open moors. The dispute first emerged with Edmund Chadderton, who held Little Nuthust Hall, claiming exclusive grazing rights on the unenclosed moorland (Theale Moor) which divided his manor from Chadderton and Hollinwood.

The feud was handed down from generation to generation. In 1526, Nuthurst bailiffs chased the Chadderton livestock off the moors. Retaliation from Chadderton soon followed with 200 armed farmers and labourers descending across Theale Moor where they were met by the Nuthurst men and bailiffs. A miniature battle ensued and the quarrel became more violent as time went on. The feud was only finally resolved at the end of the sixteenth century when boundary stakes were set up on the common moors.

== Notable people ==
Samuel Collins (1802–1878) was a 19th-century poet and radical. He was known as the Bard Of Hale Moss and lived in a cottage in the Butterworth Lane area.

== Transport ==
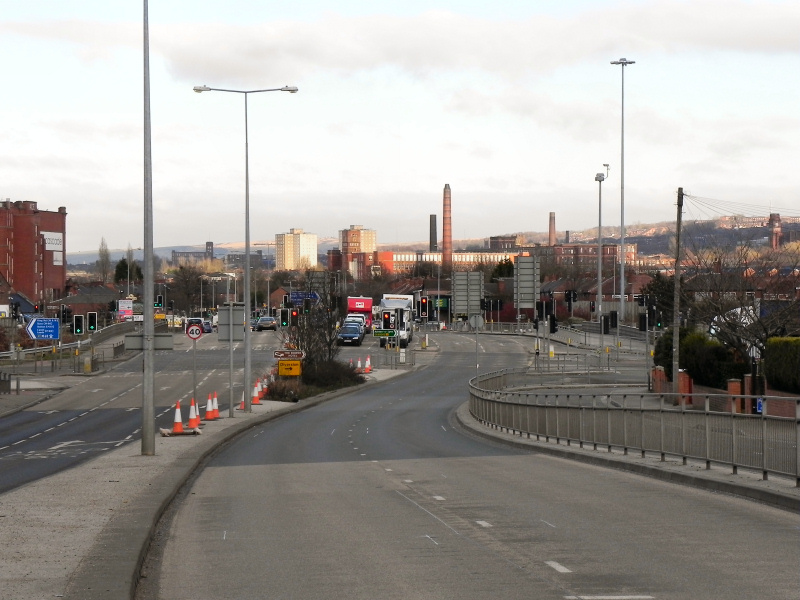
The A663 Broadway at Whitegate

Bee Network operate the following bus services in the Whitegate area:

181/182 to Manchester City Centre via New Moston and Newton Heath and to Shaw.

81 to Manchester City Centre via Moston and Harpurhey and to Oldham.

149 to Higher Crumpsall via Blackley and to Chadderton Park Estate via Oldham.

The area is also served by Moston railway station on Hollinwood Avenue which lies adjacent to the common boundary of Chadderton and Manchester at New Moston.

== See also ==
List of mills in Chadderton
