= Block Lane =

Coordinates: 53.534327°N 2.1389014°W

Block Lane (Black Ridings)
- Location within Greater Manchester
- OS grid reference: SD 90891 04195
- Metropolitan borough: Oldham
- Metropolitan county: Greater Manchester
- Region: North West
- Country: England
- Sovereign state: United Kingdom
- Post town: OLDHAM
- Postcode district: OL9
- Dialling code: 0161
- Police: Greater Manchester
- Fire: Greater Manchester
- Ambulance: North West
- UK Parliament: Oldham West and Royton

Block Lane is a locality in the town of Chadderton in the Metropolitan Borough of Oldham, Greater Manchester. It is located on Chadderton's eastern border with Oldham, contiguous with the Freehold area of that town, and with Cowhill and Butler Green.

== History ==
A hamlet at Block Lane, known as Black Ridings, lay on the ancient road of Block Lane as it followed the Oldham boundary southwards towards Butler Green. The hamlet lay at the northern end of Block Lane between the present-day Christ Church and Freehold tram stop. A notable large residence, known simply as 'Block Lane' was described by the local historian James Butterworth as the abode of a Rev. Gee from 1747 onwards. Both the Black Ridings hamlet and the adjacent Block Lane house are shown on the early Ordnance Survey maps of the area.

By the mid 19th century the area had become a centre of industrial activity with four coal pits and two sandstone quarries in close proximity. The expansion of Werneth in the Freehold area from the 1860s onwards saw housing developments reach the administrative edge of the town of Oldham at Block Lane, effectively absorbing the Black Ridings area into that district. Suburban housing now covers the area occupied by the early 18th century cottages which had been demolished by the 1960s.

The Hare And Hounds public house opened in 1855. The pub closed in late 2014 and has now been converted into a private residence.

Blackridings Mill was a cotton waste mill on Block Lane dating to 1861. It was demolished in 1975. It occupied the site of the former Blackridings Colliery. The site was redeveloped in 1982 for Freehold Community School. The mill and former colliery lay on the east side of Block Lane in Oldham, although some early 19th century records speak of the colliery lying within Chadderton.

The United Mill was a cotton mill on Block Lane. Built in 1874, it ceased production in 1959 and was demolished in 1962. A small ancillary building to the mill remains in use as a mosque.

1870 saw the opening of Christ Church, a grade II listed building.

By the 1890s, Block Lane had a bowling green and a football ground at the back of the old Black Ridings hamlet. At one time this was known as 'The Track', a venue for foot races, wrestling, football and rugby. In the late 19th century the ground was used by Werneth Rugby Club, who in 1890 were suspended from league rugby for 'professionalism'. The club disbanded in 1905.

== Christ Church (Church Of England) ==
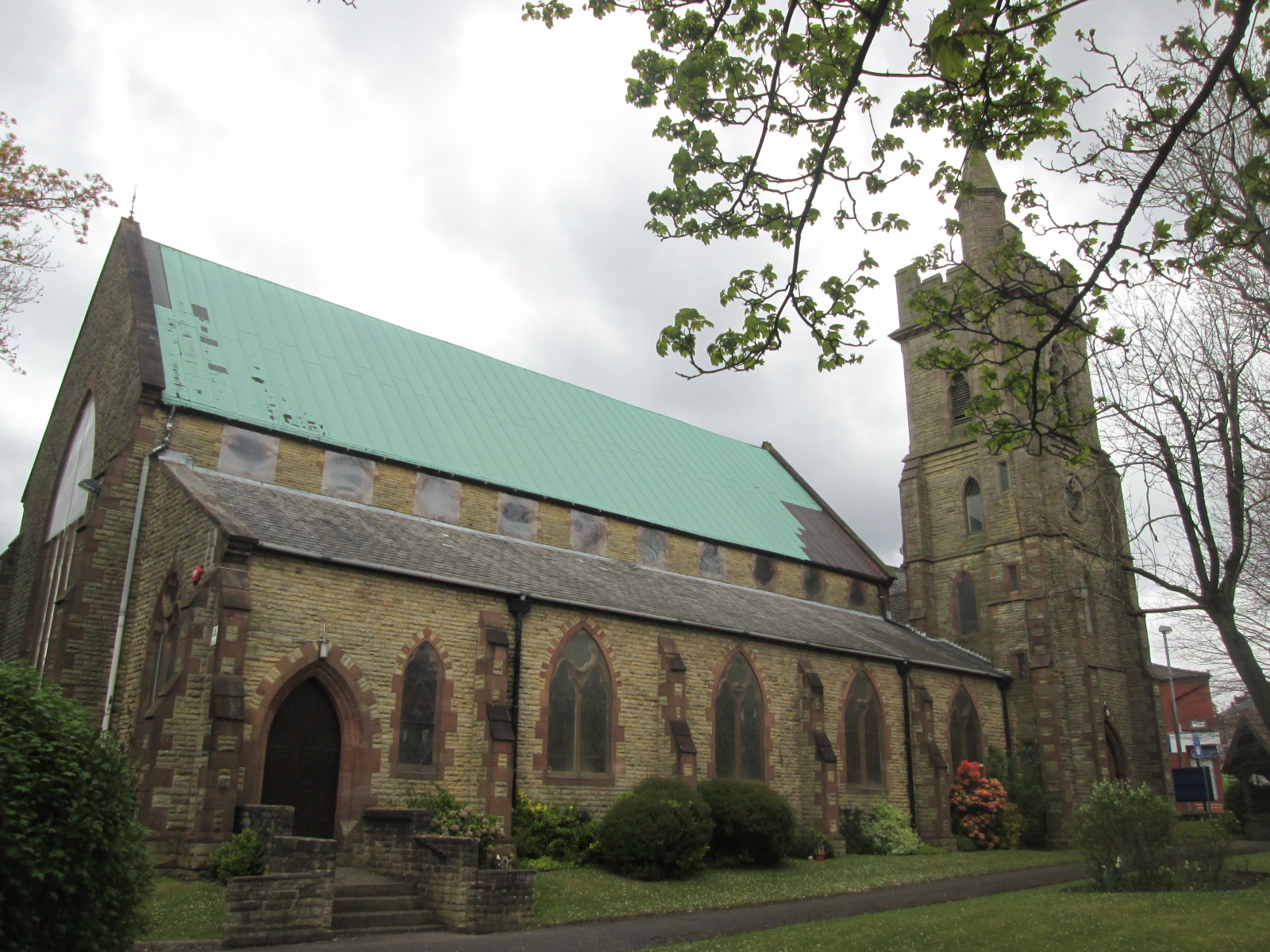
Christ Church, Chadderton

St John's Church, Werneth (closed in 1982) was the parish church for the Block Lane area from 1845 until 1870 when the new Christ Church was built by a group of laypeople who were unhappy with the increasing ritualism at St John's. They appealed for funds in February 1870 to build a new church on the lower side of the Freehold adjoining Suffolk St at its junction with Oxford St and Block Lane' a church which they planned to 'secure a permanent Evangelical ministry, and to meet the spiritual needs of a rapidly-growing population.' The funds were so quickly forthcoming that the foundation stone was laid in May and the new church was completed and opened by December of that same year, and the first vicar, the Rev'd Thomas Chapman. took his inaugural service on Christmas Day 1870.

Christ Church in time planted a new church on Denton Lane, St Saviour's, which still exists in the 21st century; it also planted Emmanuel Church just off Drury Lane which has now closed and been demolished, the congregation now meeting at its daughter church, St George's building on Broadway; and it began a work at St Gabriel's, Middleton Junction which became a parish in its own right and is still a going concern. In addition it planted mission churches at Butler Green and at Cowhill which ceased to exist in the 20th century.

Christ Church itself still meets in its original building on Block Lane well into the 21st century, but with the addition of a church centre alongside the church on the site of its former day school, and it has a voluntary aided primary school (also called Christ Church) just off Denton Lane on Crawley Way as well as its sister church of St Saviour's and a work on Crossley Estate known as Crossley Christian Centre, now closed. Christ Church is numerically one of the largest parishes in the Oldham West deanery of Manchester diocese with a population of about 15,000 in 2021.

Christ Church is a grade II listed building. The church, in Gothic Revival style, is in stone and has a roof partly of slate and partly of copper with coped gables. It consists of a nave with a clerestory, north and south aisles, a chancel, and a southeast tower. The tower has four stages, angle buttresses, an embattled parapet, and there is a square stair turret with a pyramidal top.

== Transport ==
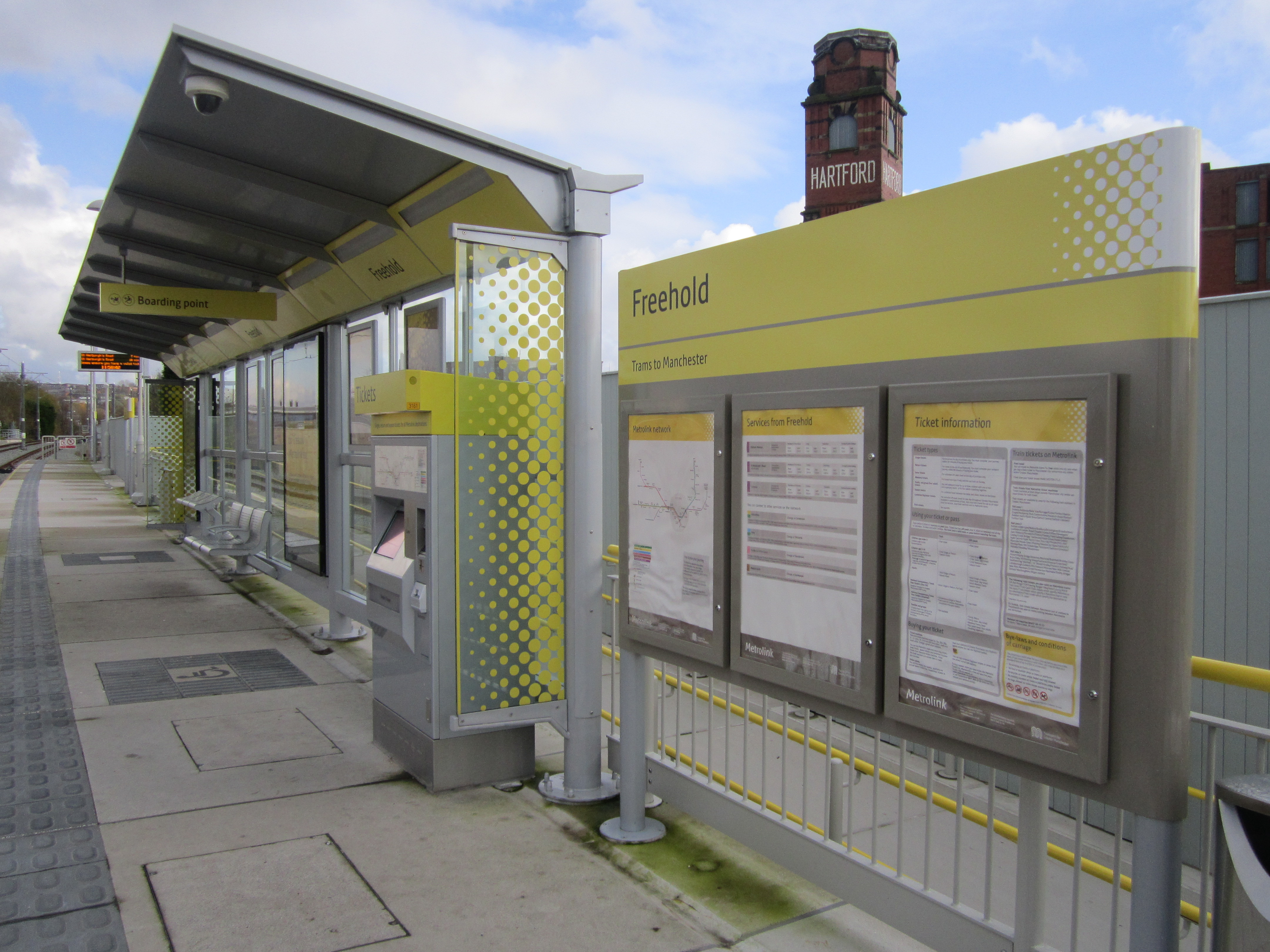
Freehold Metrolink Station

Bee Network operate the following bus services in the Block Lane area.

81 to Manchester City Centre via Moston and Harpurhey and to Oldham.

Service 159 to Oldham via Chadderton town centre and to Middleton via Hollinwood, Woodhouses, Failsworth and New Moston.

Freehold tram stop at the northern end of Block Lane provides direct tram links to East Didsbury and to Rochdale Railway Station and town centre.
