= Blackridings Mill, Oldham =

Cotton waste mill in Oldham, Greater Manchester, England

Blackridings Mill
- The mill before 1951

- Location in Greater Manchester

Cotton
- Location: Oldham, Greater Manchester, England
- Further ownership: Lancashire Cotton Corporation (1930s); Courtaulds (1964)
- Coordinates: 53.536890°N 2.1364442°W

Construction
- Floor count: 4

Blackridings Mill, Oldham was a cotton waste mill lying off Block Lane in the Werneth area of Oldham, Greater Manchester. It was built before 1861 and ceased spinning between 1875 and 1880. It was then used for flock manufacture and processing cotton waste. It was taken over by the Lancashire Cotton Corporation in the 1930s and passed to Courtaulds in 1964. Production ended in 1973 and the building was demolished in 1975.

== Location ==
Oldham is a large town in Greater Manchester, England. It lies amongst the Pennines on elevated ground between the rivers Irk and Medlock, 5.3 miles (8.5 km) south-southeast of Rochdale, and 6.9 miles (11.1 km) northeast of the city of Manchester. Oldham is surrounded by several smaller settlements which together form the Metropolitan Borough of Oldham. A rail service was provided by the Oldham Loop Line that was built by the Lancashire and Yorkshire Railway.

== History ==
Oldham rose to prominence during the 19th century as an international centre of textile manufacture. It was a boomtown of the Industrial Revolution, and amongst the first ever industrialised towns, rapidly becoming "one of the most important centres of cotton and textile industries in England", spinning Oldham counts, the coarser counts of cotton. Oldham's soils were too thin and poor to sustain crop growing, and so for decades prior to industrialisation the area was used for grazing sheep, which provided the raw material for a local woollen weaving trade. It was not until the last quarter of the 18th century that Oldham changed from being a cottage industry township producing woollen garments via domestic manual labour, to a sprawling industrial metropolis of textile factories. The first mill, Lees Hall, was built by William Clegg in about 1778. Within a year, 11 other mills had been constructed, but by 1818 there were only 19 of these privately owned mills.

It was in the second half of the 19th century, that Oldham became the world centre for spinning cotton yarn. This was due in a large part to the formation of limited liability companies known as Oldham Limiteds. In 1851, over 30% of Oldham's population was employed within the textile sector, compared to 5% across Great Britain. At its zenith, it was the most productive cotton spinning mill town in the world. By 1871 Oldham had more spindles than any country in the world except the United States, and in 1909, was spinning more cotton than France and Germany combined. By 1911 there were 16.4 million spindles in Oldham, compared with a total of 58 million in the United Kingdom and 143.5 million in the world; in 1928, with the construction of the UK's largest textile factory Oldham reached its manufacturing zenith. At its peak, there were over 360 mills, operating night and day;

Blackridings Mill predates the joint-stock company boom of 1861, and ceased spinning between 1875 and 1880. It was subsequently used for processing cotton waste.

The industry peaked in 1912 when it produced eight billion yards of cloth. The Great War of 1914–1918 halted the supply of raw cotton, and the British government encouraged its colonies to build mills to spin and weave cotton. The war over, Lancashire never regained its markets. The independent mills were struggling. The Bank of England set up the Lancashire Cotton Corporation in 1929 to attempt to rationalise and save the industry. Blackridings Mill, Oldham was one of 104 mills bought by the LCC, and one of the 53 mills that survived through to 1950. It was demolished in 1975.

=== Later extensions ===
1915 and 1918

=== Owners ===
- Lancashire Cotton Corporation (1930s–1964)
- Courtaulds (1964–

== See also ==
- Textile manufacturing

== Bibliography ==
- Dunkerley, Philip (2009). "Dunkerley-Tuson Family Website, The Regent Cotton Mill, Failsworth". Archived from the original on 12 February 2009.
- LCC (1951). The mills and organisation of the Lancashire Cotton Corporation Limited. Blackfriars House, Manchester: Lancashire Cotton Corporation Limited.
- Gurr, Duncan; Hunt, Julian (1998). The Cotton Mills of Oldham. Oldham Education & Leisure. ISBN 0-902809-46-6.
- Roberts, A S (1921), "Arthur Robert's Engine List", Arthur Roberts Black Book., One guy from Barlick-Book Transcription, archived from the original on 23 July 2011
