= Chadderton Hall Park =

Park in Chadderton, Greater Manchester, England

Coordinates: 53.5549°N 2.1583°W

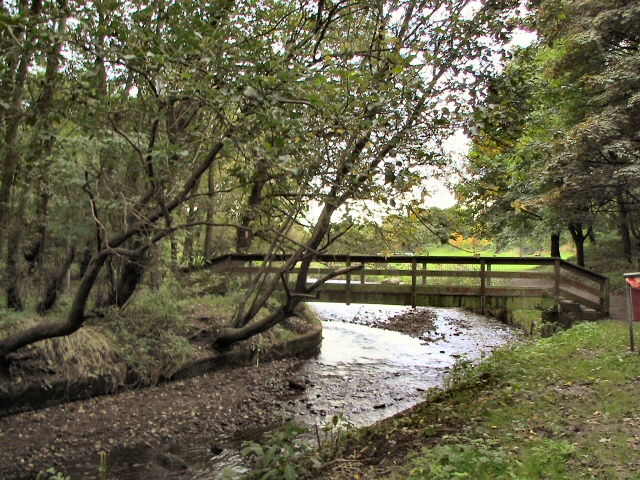
Chadderton Hall Park by the River Irk

Chadderton Hall Park is a park in Chadderton, in the Metropolitan Borough of Oldham, Greater Manchester, England. Its roots stretch back to the 13th century being the land on which Chadderton Hall once stood. It contains a large field area with a small football pitch, a playground area, several flower gardens and a small café situated next to the Park's bowling green. The River Irk runs through the centre of the park.

== Geography ==
Chadderton Hall Park is located on Chadderton Hall Road (B6195) towards the north of Chadderton. It lies at the bottom of Chadderton Heights. The geography of the park itself is like a bowl, the grass fields lie in the centre of the park at the lowest point and the land to either side of the fields is higher. This is because of the River Irk's natural valley but also because the central area of the park was once used as a lake.

== History ==
Chadderton Hall Park was originally the grounds of Chadderton Hall. Chadderton Hall was first built in the 13th century by Geoffrey de Chadderton, this first hall was in Chadderton Fold slightly to the east of the current park. In 1629 a new hall was built at the site of the current park and was present there until the 20th century when it was demolished in 1939. It was at the end of the 19th Century that the area surrounding Chadderton Hall began to be used for public recreation. A boating lake and a menagerie, including a kangaroo and a lion, were established as part of a "Pleasure Garden". These features have long since been demolished but evidence of the boating lake can be seen by the hollowed out area where the playing fields now stand.

== Notable people ==
Joseph Aston (1762–1844), the journalist and dramatist, died at Chadderton Hall, 19 Oct. 1844.
