= List of mills in Chadderton =

This is a list of the cotton and other textile mills in Chadderton, Greater Manchester, England.

== A–E ==
Name	Architect	Location	Built	Demolished	Served (Years)
Ace	P.S.Stott	Whitegate Lane SD896037 53°31′49″N 2°09′26″W	1914	Standing	53
	Notes:				
Acorn	Stott & Sons(Extensions)	Union St SD909038 53°31′53″N 2°08′18″W	c. 1860	c. 1916*	
	Notes: Built by John Charles Beard. Was extended in 1882 and 1884. Its spindleage in 1889, when it was a doublers and tape warp makers, was 10,000. Land now occupied by housing.				
Alder Root		Cowhill, Chadderton SD910048 53°32′21″N 2°08′10″W	c.1860	c.1883	
	Notes: Old building used as a mill. Demolished to make way for Glenby Mill (see below)				
Asia	F.W.Dixon	Clayton St SD912031 53°31′26″N 2°08′49″W	1904	1982	77
	Notes: Spindleage: (1915) 117,000 Platts. Engine:Buckley & Taylor				
Bank		Crossley Bridge SD899048 53°32′25″N 2°09′10″W	1776	c. 1900	
	Notes: Watermill built by Thomas Ashton				
Baytree	Stott and Sons	Mills Hill Road SD888053 53°32′38″N 2°10′12″W	1903	1985	56
	Notes: Spindleage: (1915) 97,000 Dobson & Barlow. Engine:George Saxon 1400hp. Used by Avro for manufacture of aircraft parts during World War II				
Bentfield		Peel Street SD909049 53°32′29″N 2°08′17″W	1969	Standing	22
	Notes: Single storey shed on site of Platt Brothers Hartfield Forge.				
Boundary		Mills Hill Road SD888059 53°32′59″N 2°10′10″W	<1861	c. 1932	
	Notes: 1891- Thorburn and Co, Ltd. Spindleage: (1915) 10,500 mule 3,500 ring. Engine:Scott and Hodgson 300hp.				
Bower		Henshaw Lane, Chadderton SD901027 53°31′17″N 2°09′03″W	c. 1780	c. 1900	
	Notes: Water-powered early mill converted into a rope works. By 1861, it was spinning cotton again before being converted into a glue works.				
Busk	P.S.Stott	Busk Road SD913057 53°32′53″N 2°07′59″W	c. 1847	1931	
	Notes: Spindleage: (1915) 23,624 ring; 10,000 doubling. Engine:(1906)J. E. Wood 525hp				
Butler Green	A.H.Stott	Wallis Street SD905038 53°31′53″N 2°08′44″W	1863	1948	72
	Notes: Spindleage: (1915) 96,816				
Chadderton	P.S. Stott	Fields New Rd SD907045 53°32′13″N 2°08′30″W	1885	Standing	115
	Grade II listed building.Notes: Spindleage: (1915) 102,456 Platt. Engine:Hick, Hargreaves & Co. 1100hp Cast iron and steel frame with brick cladding, 5 storey 18 bay by 9 bay with later extensions.				
Clarence	Wild	James Street 53°32′45″N 2°08′24″W	c. 1869	1889	
	Notes: Spindleage: (1889) 78,590 Demolished and replaced with Wren Mill, and then Asda.				
Clough		Hunt Clough	c. 1776	?	
	Notes: A small water-powered mill. There were also two Clough Mills in Shaw and one in Springhead.				

== F–J ==
Name	Architect	Location	Built	Demolished	Served (Years)
Falcon Mill	P S Stott	Victoria Street 53°32′54″N 2°08′11″W	1885	Standing	74
	Notes: The big single storey building is an unusual (for Oldham) example of a weaving shed among the big spinning mills. Designed by P S Stott in 1885 for the Oldham Velvet Manufacturing Co. In 1915 it had 802 looms powered by an Urmson & Thompson engine.				
Fernhurst	A H Stott	Fernhurst Street SD911064 53°33′14″N 2°08′10″W	1905	2011	59
	Notes: Spindleage: (1915)112,524 Platts. Engine Browett & Lindley 1400hp. Extended in 1946, taken over by Cotton & Rayon Spinners Ltd. In 2011 it was demolished and in 2015 it was announced that the site would be used for a "DifRent" housing scheme.				
Firwood		Joshua Lane SD888051 53°32′35″N 2°10′13″W	c. 1844	1960	
	Notes: Spindleage: (1915)14,376 mule, 500 looms. Built by James Cheetham by the Rochdale canal, did velvets and twills				
Forge Mill / Stock Lane Mill		Stock Lane SD908049 53°32′28″N 2°08′24″W	1858	1978	
	Notes: Spindleage: (1915) 24,048.Built by Higginson and Wallwork then sold to Bodden and Mercer. In 1875 changed name to Stock Lane, extended in 1912 and again in 1926.				
Gem	FW Dixon	Fields New Rd SD903039 53°31′55″N 2°08′49″W	1901	2008	36
	Notes: Ceased spinning cotton in 1937. Taken over by the Ferranti company during WWII to manufacture radio valves and then semiconductor devices. Demolished in 2008 to make way for housing. Spindleage: (1915) 115,000 Asa Lees. Engine:George Saxon 1700hp				
Glebe		Drury Lane SD905030 53°31′26″N 2°08′42″W	1866	1973	104
	Notes: Spindleage: (1915) 127,600 mule,24336 ring, 300 doubling Platts/Howard & Bullough. Engine:(1871)W & J Yates 220hp, (1906) Scott & Hodgson 2500hp (1914)Scott & Hodgson 1250hp				
Glenby		Cowhill, SD910047 53°32′21″N 2°08′10″W	1885	1962	74
Gordon	J Wild	Elizabeth St SD901033 53°31′34″N 2°09′04″W	1884	c. 1968	75
	Notes: Spindleage: (1915) 66,000 Platts. Engine:Buckley & Taylor 1200hp				
Gorse	P S Stott	Gorse Street SD897038 53°31′54″N 2°09′25″W	1908	Standing	51
	Notes: Gorse (and Rugby) Mill, Chadderton. A cell phone mast is currently mounted to the stair tower. The engine house has been demolished. Architect was P S Stott. Built 1908. Engine was 1600 hp Urmson & Thompson cross compound.				
Green Lane / Apex		Green Lane, SD888050 53°32′32″N 2°10′13″W	1871	c. 1928	
Grimshaw	E Potts	Chadderton SD888049 53°32′27″N 2°10′08″W	1874	c. 1946	
	Notes: Spindleage: (1915) 47,472 Platts/Asa Lees.				
Hawthorn		Chadderton SD911057 53°32′53″N 2°08′06″W	1878	1971	92
	Notes: Spindleage: (1915) 92,000 Engine:George Saxon.800hp It was still powered by steam through a rope race when in closed in May 2000.				
Junction	E. Potts	Junction Street SD890049 53°32′28″N 2°10′01″W	1874	2000*	81
	Notes: 1891-Junction Spinning Co Ltd. Spindleage: (1915) 73,572 Asa Lees Engine:George Saxon.1000hp Transferred to the Lancashire Cotton Corporation in the 1930s.				

== K–O ==
Name	Architect	Location	Built	Demolished	Served (Years)
Kent	G Stott	Victoria St, Chadderton SD912060 53°33′04″N 2°08′02″W	1908	1994	83
	Notes: Cotton spinning mill built in 1908 by Kent Mill Ltd and latterly part of the Courtaulds Group. Architect was G Stott. 104,000 spindles. 1200 horsepower George Saxon steam engine. Mill closed 1991 and demolished 1994. The adjoining Manor Mill is still standing.				
Landsdowne / Avon		Crompton St SD911052 53°32′35″N 2°08′10″W	1861	1937	
	Notes: Spindleage: (1915) 77,000 Platts. Engine:(1885) George Saxon,300hp, (1902)Buckley & Taylor,800hp. Built by John Walton for himself and Abraham Stott, sold to Mr Jackson Brierley and the Lansdown Spinning Co who extended it in 1885. Taken over by the Avon Spinning Company in 1901 and renamed. Serious fires 9 December 1921 and 25 November 1922.				
Lark	F.W.Dixon	Chadderton SD904041 53°31′59″N 2°08′46″W	1901	1938	37
	Notes: Spindleage: (1915) 109,704 Engine:George Saxon.1800hp				
Laurel	Stott & Son	Chadderton SD888054 53°32′44″N 2°10′10″W	1905	1988	
	Notes: Spindleage: (1915) 120,000, Hetherington Engine:George Saxon.1400hp				
Logwood		Mill Brow, Chadderton SD900068 53°33′29″N 2°09′07″W	c. 1859	c. 1923	
	Notes: Ancient corn mill converted into a dye works. Extended in 1905				
Magnet	F.W.Dixon	Denton Lane, Chadderton SD904046 53°32′17″N 2°08′46″W	1902	c. 1967	
	Notes: Spindleage: (1915) 60,156 mule, 44,680 ring, Howard & Bullough Engine:George Saxon.1700hp				
Malta	F.W.Dixon	Mills Hill Rd, Chadderton SD889088 53°32′53″N 2°10′08″W	1905	Standing	
	Notes: Spindleage: (1915) 110,160 Platts. Engine:Buckley & Taylor 1200hp.Taken over by the LCC in the late 1940s.				
Manor	G. Stott	Victoria St SD911058 53°32′56″N 2°08′10″W	1906	Standing	84
	1244330Notes: Cast iron and steel construction, faced in brick with stone dressings and flat roof. 5 storeys, 36 bays by 13 bay . Water tank with copper dome. Spindleage: (1915) 91,136 Asa Lees Engine:George Saxon.1200hp. Ceased production in 1932, reopened by the LCC in 1940				
Melbourne		Chadderton SD908053 53°32′38″N 2°08′24″W	1860	1980	99
	Notes: Spindleage: (1915) 86,206 Platts. Engine:J.Musgrave & Sons, 140hp, Buckley & Taylor 1300hp. Built in 1860 by the Oldham Cotton Spinning Co, one of the earliest Oldham Limiteds Refloated in 1923 as Melbourne Mills Ltd.				
Melrose		Chadderton SD906040 53°31′59″N 2°08′35″W	1869	c. 1942	66
	Notes: Spindleage: (1915) 40,000				
Mills Hill		Corbrook Road, Chadderton, SD890061 53°33′05″N 2°10′01″W	c. 1875	1909	
Mona	P.S.Stott	Chadderton SD906043 53°32′06″N 2°08′35″W	1905	2012	54
	Notes: Spindleage: (1915) 90,456 Platts. Engine:George Saxon.1400hp.				
Nile	P S Stott	Fields New Rd SD905043 53°32′06″N 2°08′42″W	1898	Standing	
	1376627Notes: Spindleage: (1915) 104,000 rings Platts. Engine:Buckley & Taylor 2000hp. When built, this was the largest ring spinning mill in the world. It was the last mill built with a beam engine, and the last to use vertical shafts and gears. An extra storey was added in 1905, the card room was extended in 1907 and further extensions in 1912 and 1914.				
Oak	T.Mitchell	Spencer St, Chadderton SD910037 53°31′48″N 2°08′13″W	1874	1934	55
	Notes: Spindleage (1915) 122,090				
Osborne	Architect	Robinson St, Chadderton SD909046 53°32′17″N 2°08′19″W	1853	1973	
	Notes: Spindleage (1915) 46,736. Built in 1853 by Robert Ogden & Co. Scene of an accident, 15 March 1875, when a ten-year employee was burnt to death. Taken over in 1889 by the Osborne Mill Co Ltd, and extended in 1903 and in 1926, now residential.				
Osborne	Architect	Osborne Street SD914057 53°32′53″N 2°07′52″W	1853	Standing	120
	Notes: Pair of mills on Osborne and Waddington Streets. No. 1 (back)was by A H Stott in 1873, extended 1891 and 1900, closed 1968. 66,008 spindles in 1910.No. 2 was by P S Stott in 1912 with 54,720 spindles. Also closed 1968. No. 1 had Petrie engines and then from 1920 a C A Parsons turbine. No. 2 had a 1200 hp Hick, Hargreaves. Now in multiple occupation.				

== P–T ==
Name	Architect	Location	Built	Demolished	Served (Years)
Palm	Potts, Pickup &Dixon	Chadderton SD90605053°32′30″N 2°08′32″W	1884	1928*	42
	Notes: Spindleage (1915) 93,000 ring, 10,000 doubling. Platts/Howard & Bullough. Engines: Two Pollit & Wigzell, 1200hp in all. It was built on the site of the former Stockbrook Mill in 1884, as the first wholly ring mill in the district. An extra storey was added in 1899.				
Ram (Orb)	A H Stott; P S Stott	Gordon Street SD896041 53°31′59″N 2°09′29″W	1907	Standing	64
	Notes:				
Ramsey	F.W.Dixon	Chadderton SD906042 53°32′02″N 2°08′35″W	1906	1979	
	Notes: Spindleage (1915) 90,000 Platts. Engine: Urmson & Thompson.				
Raven	P S Stott	Chadderton SD903042 53°32′02″N 2°08′53″W	1907	Standing	
	Notes: Spindleage (1915) 90,432 mule, 18,240 ring, Asa Lees. Engine:Buckley & Taylor 1500hp.				
Richmond	P S Stott	Chadderton SD907034 53°31′37″N 2°08′31″W	1889	1976	
	Notes: Spindleage (1915) 66,300 mule.Engine:Buckley & Taylor 1000hp.				
Rose	P S Stott	Chadderton SD904033 53°31′34″N 2°08′46″W	1885	2007	61
	Notes: Spindleage (1915) 45,972. Engine:Timoth Bates & Co. During construction 25 May 1885 there was an accident when the floors collapsed. Following frequent arson attacks the mill was burnt down in 2007.				
Rugby	F.W.Dixon	Chadderton SD895038 53°31′54″N 2°09′32″W	1908	2014	90
	Notes: Spindleage (1915) 113,613 Platts. Engine: George Saxon, 1200hp.				
Rushbank	J.Wild	Chadderton SD906056 53°32′49″N 2°08′35″W	c. 1862	1974	
	Notes: Spindleage (1915) 60,625.Built by Edmund Whittaker who to expand bought the adjacent Springvale Mill. They were connected in 1922.				
Spring (Shaw's)		Chadderton SD905038 53°31′51″N 2°08′38″W	c. 1870	c. 1955	
	Notes: Spindleage (1915) 15,000. Doubling. From 1889 Joseph Shaw's company ran this mill.				
Springbrook(e)		Chadderton	c. 1875	c. 1985	
Springfield Works		Lansdowne Road, Chadderton SD895017 53°32′24″N 2°08′02″W	c. 1860	c. 1938	
	Notes: Spindleage (1915) 70,000. Built for Shaw & Butterworth. John Shaw continued to run the mill alone throughout his life.				
Spring Vale		Chadderton SD907056 53°32′49″N 2°08′31″W	c. 1865	1975	
	Notes: Spindleage (1889) 13,000. Built by Mark Garfitt and others in the 1860s it was taken over by Edmund Whittaker & Sons of Rushbank Mill.There were extensions in 1900, 1912 and 1913 and a connecting link with Rushbank Mill was built in 1922. The sites lie under the Asda store.				
Stockbrook		Chadderton SD906050 53°32′30″N 2°08′31″W	1791	1869	
	Notes: An early mill built in 1791 by John Smethurst. It had a 14hp steam engine in 1832 and closed in 1869, the site was later used for the building of Palm Mill.				
Stockfield	P S Stott	Chadderton SD907052 53°32′35″N 2°08′31″W	1862	Standing	
	Notes: Spindleage: (1915) 120,000 (with Vale). Engine: (1913) Buckley & Taylor. Built by J & T Heginbottom, taken over and extended by William Tylot of Vale Mill. Incorporated in 1897. Extended in 1912 and 1923.				
Sun	T. Mitchell	Chadderton SD908052 53°32′35″N 2°08′24″W	1861	1986*	98
	Notes: Spindleage: (1915) 157,000. Engine:Scott and Hodgson 2500hp. A cooperative enterprise. Refloated by Limited in 1919.				
Swan	E. Potts	Chadderton SD890047 53°32′20″N 2°10′01″W	1875	Standing	84
	Notes: 1891- Swan Cotton Spinning Co Ltd. Spindleage: (1915) 106,956. Engine:Pollock & McNab 1000hp;Scott & Hodgson 1750. (1912)				
Textile	Pott, Pickup & Dixon	Chadderton SD908052 53°32′35″N 2°08′24″W	1882	1996	45
	Notes: Spindleage (1915) 98,436. Engine: Hick, Hargreaves & Co. 1300hp				

== U–Z ==
Name	Architect	Location	Built	Demolished	Served (Years)
United	T Mitchell	Chadderton SD909039 53°31′55″N 2°08′20″W	1874	1962	85
	Notes: 1891-United Spinning Co Ltd. Spindleage: (1915) 95,600 mule, 12,496 ring. Engine: Timothy Bates & Co 1400hp (1902), Pollit & Wigzell 1800hp.				
Vale		Stockfield Road, Chadderton 53°32′35″N 2°08′17″W	c. 1860	1964*	
	Notes: Built for William Taylor & Brothers who operated the adjacent Stockfield Mill				
Victoria		Drury Lane, Chadderton SD906031 53°31′32″N 2°08′28″W	c. 1854	1973	
	Notes: Spindleage: (1889) 37000. Built by William Buckley, Taken over by Victoria Mill Co (Hollinwood) Ltd in 1903. Extended in 1940, destroyed by fire but survived by an old weaving shed that has been built around and still operating in 2016. Its current owners formerly occupied Windsor Mill in Failsworth for several decades.				
Waverley		Milne St, Chadderton 53°33′N 2°08′W	c. 1865	c. 1900	
	Notes: Spindleage:(1889) 17130 twist. Engine: 1882 Timothy Bates & Co.				
Wren	FW Dixon	Milne St, Chadderton 53°32′45″N 2°08′24″W	1901	c. 1970	36
	Notes: Spindleage: 1915 81704. Engine: Buckley & Taylor 1800 hp. Now under ASDA.				

== See also ==
- List of mills in Oldham
- List of mills in Shaw and Crompton
