= Busk, Greater Manchester =

Coordinates: 53.547269°N 2.133493°W

Busk
- Location within Greater Manchester
- OS grid reference: SD9125205634
- Metropolitan borough: Oldham
- Metropolitan county: Greater Manchester
- Region: North West
- Country: England
- Sovereign state: United Kingdom
- Post town: OLDHAM
- Postcode district: OL9
- Dialling code: 0161
- Police: Greater Manchester
- Fire: Greater Manchester
- Ambulance: North West
- UK Parliament: Oldham West and Royton

Busk is a locality and archaically a hamlet in the town of Chadderton in the Metropolitan Borough of Oldham, Greater Manchester, England. It is located to the east of Chadderton town centre, on the town's eastern border with Oldham, contiguous with the Westwood area of that town.

The hamlet lay along Busk Road, on a stretch of the road that is now a cycle path. A small recreation ground, Berry's Field, serves the area.

Since local government re-organisation in 1974 the area lies within the Coldhurst electoral ward district which lies mainly within the town of Oldham. A proposal by The Chadderton Historical Society to move Busk back into the Chadderton North ward was rejected by the Boundary Commission in 2003.

The place-name Busk survives in the immediately adjoining streets to the west and south of the original hamlet, known as Busk Estate.

== History ==
Due to widespread redevelopment in the 1960s and 1970s, little remains of the original settlement. The Britannia Inn at the heart of the community still stands but has been closed for several years. An early cotton mill, The Busk, was erected in 1847, closing in 1931. See List of mills in Chadderton. In the mid 1960s the land on which the mill stood was reclaimed to become part of the recreation ground Berry's Field to replace land partly lost to housing on the northern part of the Busk Estate. In 1895 Berry's Field was home to Pine Villa Football Club for two seasons. In 1899 Pine Villa became the future league football club Oldham Athletic F.C.

Busk Council School, which had its origins in a Wesleyan Methodist Sunday School, opened in a group of adjoining cottages in August 1862. Following the success of the school a piece of land was then offered in Busk Street and a new church and school was opened in June 1872. The Infants' school closed in December 1924, the Board of Education considering the premises to be 'unsuitable for continued recognition and incapable of improvement'. It was replaced by Mills Hill Council School. The Mixed school continued until 31 March 1926 when the pupils were transferred to North Chadderton Council School.

Busk Street Wesleyan Methodist Church continued to serve the area until its closure around 1957.

1932 saw the formation of the Busk Congregational Prize Band, the forerunner of the Chadderton And District Band which in the 1950s became the official band of the Chadderton Urban District Council.

== Links ==
Busk Mill and its environs http://www.britainfromabove.org.uk/image/eaw004458
