= Bliss Tweed Mill =

Former mill in Oxfordshire, England

Coordinates: 51.937943°N 1.558714°W

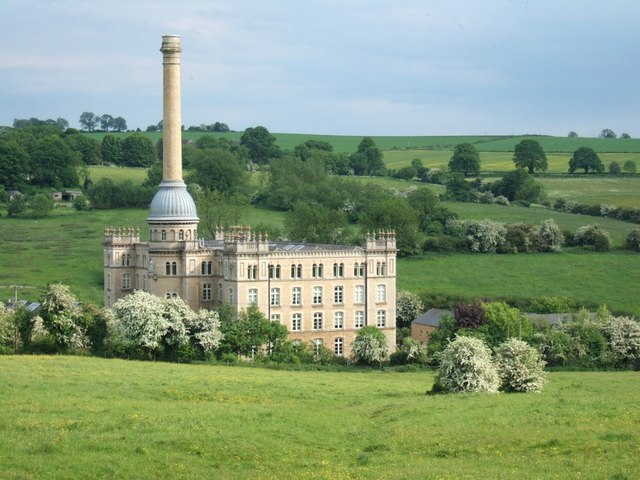
1198094Bliss Mill, built in 1872

Bliss Tweed Mill is a former mill for the manufacture of tweed. It is located on the edge of Chipping Norton, Oxfordshire, United Kingdom. It became a Grade II* listed building in 1980 as a distinctive work of British industrial architecture.

The mill was built in 1872 for cloth manufacturer William Bliss and Son, to make fine tweed cloth from locally produced wool. It was designed by the architect George Woodhouse of Bolton, who also designed mills in Lancashire, including Victoria Mill in Miles Platting; Woodhouse was also involved in the construction of Bolton Town Hall.

The main 5-storey spinning building is faced with local limestone and styled to resemble a country house, with square towers at each corner topped by stone urns. Unusually, a large chimney for the furnace to power the mill's steam machinery issues from a dome at the top of a circular tower built into one façade. The chimneystack is styled as a tall Tuscan column. Inside, the building is supported by cast iron columns that carry beams bearing brick vaults. An adjacent lower building was used for weaving the tweed cloth.

The millworkers went on strike for eight months from December 1913 to June 1914, over the right of workers to join a trades union, but the mill prospered in the First World War after receiving a large order for khaki cloth for the British Army.

The mill closed in 1980 and was converted into residential apartments in around 1988.
