= George Woodhouse (architect) =

English architect (1829–1883)

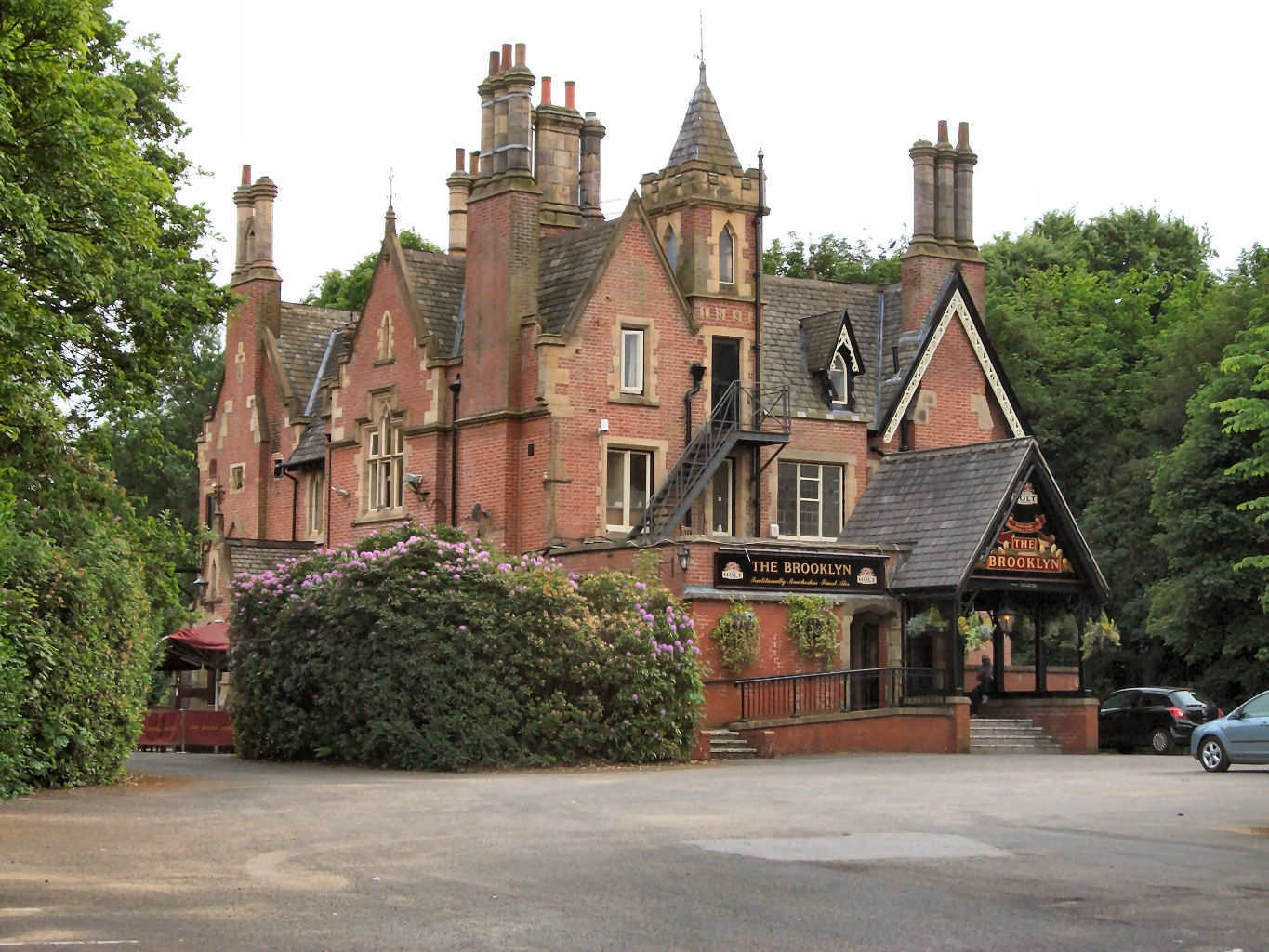
House, Green Lane, Bolton (later a public house, now Lord's Independent School), 1859

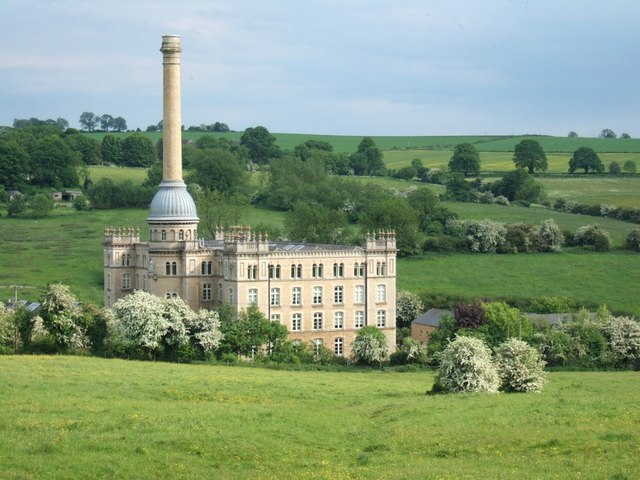
Bliss Mill, on the edge of Chipping Norton, Oxfordshire, 1872

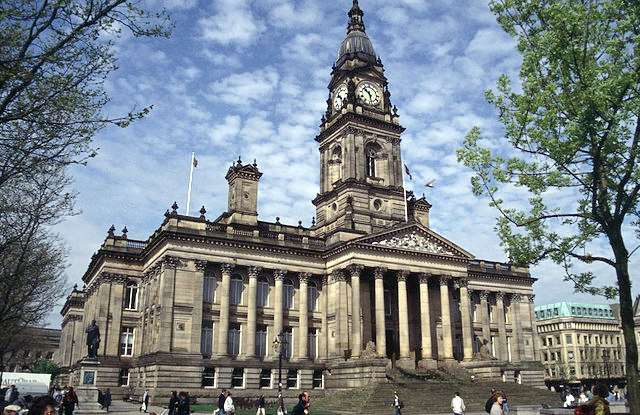
Bolton Town Hall, 1866–1873

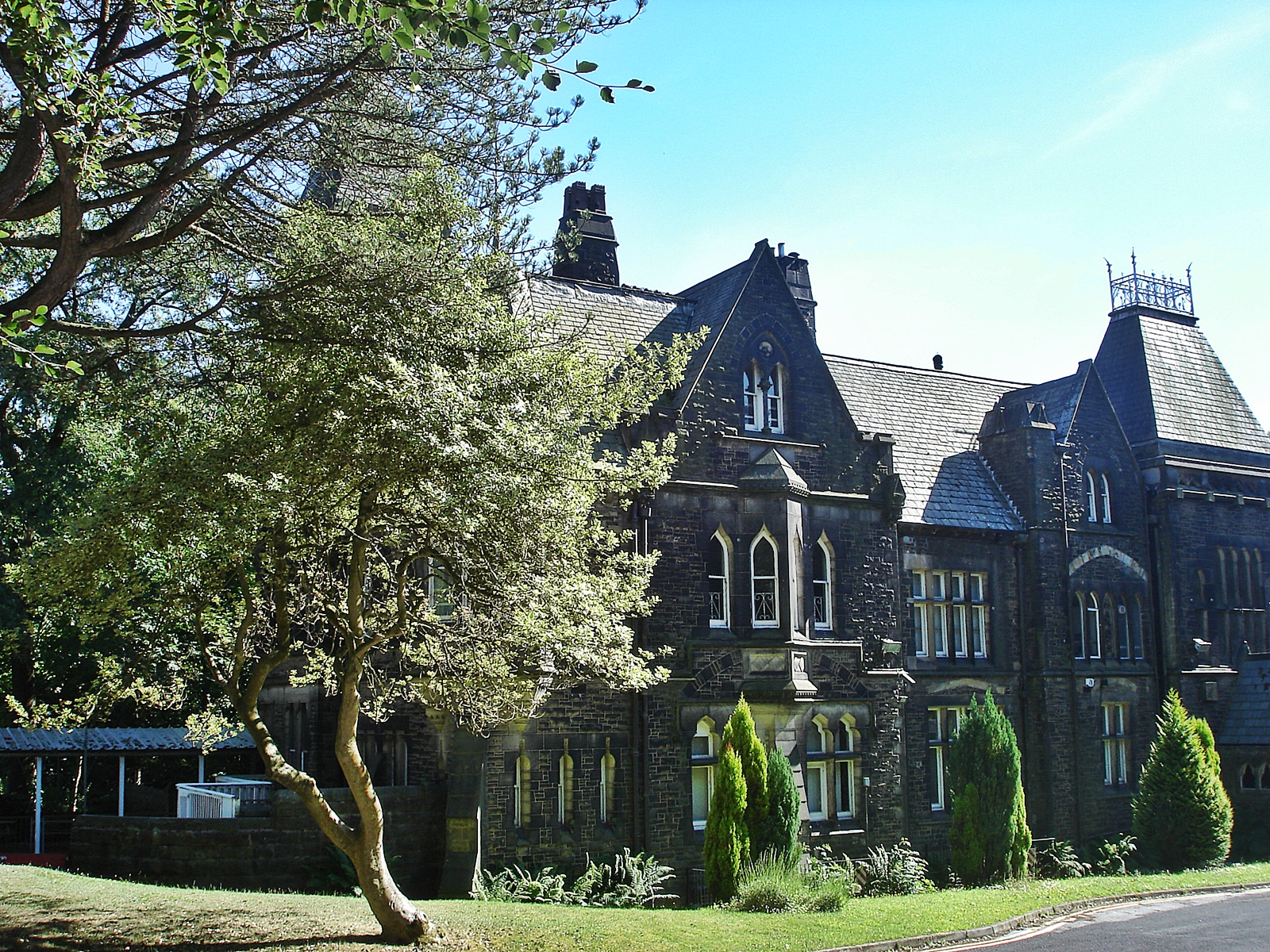
Former mansion for the Mellor Family, Chorley Road (later Woodside Junior School, now Clevelands Nursery and Preparatory School), 1877

George Woodhouse (29 July 1829 – 3 September 1883) was an English architect who practised from offices in Bolton, and Oldham, then in the county of Lancashire. He collaborated with William Hill on the designs for Bolton Town Hall.

== Career ==
He was born on 19 July 1829 at Lindley, near Huddersfield, the son of John Woodhouse (1788–1862) and Sarah Moor (1788–1875), and baptised on 13 August 1829 in Zion Methodist New Connexion Chapel, Lindley. At age 15 he was apprenticed to James Whittaker of Silverwell Yard of Bradshawgate and later John Williamson Whittaker with whom he entered into partnership. This partnership lasted until 1852.

In independent practice, he had offices at St George's Road, Bolton (from 1860), and Clegg Street, Oldham in Greater Manchester.

He worked in partnership with Edward Potts (1839–1909) from 1861 until 1872 and was later in partnership with William James Morley (1847–1930) around 1883.

He was a prominent Wesleyan Methodist, and was for many years organist of Park Street Chapel.

He was married three times:

- Firstly to Emma Crosland (1833–1860) of Yew Tree, Lindley at Highfield Independent Chapel on 17 December 1851.
- Secondly to Ellen Piggott (1834–1867) on 19 June 1862 in Barnsley, Yorkshire. The children from this marriage were:
  - George Herbert Woodhouse (1863–1925)
  - Emma Woodhouse (1865–1907)
  - John Arthur Woodhouse (1866–1949)
- Thirdly to Harriett Knowles (1849–1894), daughter of Robert Knowles of West Bank, Bolton in the Parish Church at Lytham on 20 April 1871. The children from this marriage were:
  - Robert Knowles Woodhouse (1872–1955)
  - Noel Woodhouse (1873–1946)
  - Henry Basil Woodhouse (1877–1951)
  - William Gilbert Woodhouse (1879–1963)
  - Alfred Victor Woodhouse (1881–1911)

He died on 3 September 1883 in Uttoxeter, Staffordshire and was interred in the graveyard of St Peter's Church, Halliwell.

== Notable works ==
- Heaton Grange, Heaton, Bolton (1853)
- Gilnow New Mills, Bolton (1854; damaged by fire in 1868)
- Lee Chapel, Lee Lane, Horwich (1856)
- Independent Chapel, Bolton Cemetery (1856)
- Bank Street Unitarian Chapel, Bolton (1856)
- Organ screen, Wesley Chapel, Bolton (1857)
- New General Post Office, Market Square, Bolton (1857; alterations)
- Bolton Union Workhouse, Fishpool (1858–59)
- House, Green Lane, Bolton (1859; later a public house, now Lord's Independent School)
- Mr. Luke Boardman's New Ragged School, Bark Street (1860)
- Coventry Cotton Company Mill, Radford, Coventry (1861)
- Fletcher Street Wesleyan Chapel, Manchester (1861; demolished in 1960s)
- Atlas Company Cotton Mill, Halliwell (1862)
- Newton Moor Cotton Spinning Company Mill (1862)
- Park Street Wesleyan Chapel, Bolton (1862–63; now demolished)
- Wesleyan New Chapel, Walkden, Little Hulton (1863)
- Wesleyan Schools, Regent Road, Salford (1864)
- Methodist New Connexion Chapel, Lindley, Huddersfield (1864)
- Independent Sunday School, Rose Hill (1865)
- St Paul's Schools, Deansgate (1866)
- New Wesleyan Chapel (Oakes Chapel), Lindley, Huddersfield (1867–68)
- Astley Bridge Wesleyan Chapel and Schools, Seymour Road, Bolton (1868; demolished in 2015)
- New Baptist Chapel, St George's Road, Bolton (1868–69)
- Victoria Mill, Lower Vickers Street, Miles Platting, Manchester (1869)
- Wesleyan Chapel, Halliwell Road, Bolton (1869)
- Wesleyan Chapel, Dale Street, Leamington Spa (1869)
- Bradford Buildings, 25 and 27 Mawdsley Street, Bolton (c. 1870)
- Bliss Tweed Mill, Chipping Norton, Oxfordshire (1872)
- Belper Congregational Church, Derbyshire (1872)
- Baptist Chapel and School, Blackburn Road, Haslingden (1872)
- Bolton Town Hall; with William Hill of Leeds (1866–1873)
- Sunnyside Mills, Daubhill, Bolton (1871–1874; extensions)
- Wyclif Congregational Church, Bewsey Road, Warrington (1873)
- Former mansion for the Mellor Family, Chorley Road, Bolton; later Woodside Junior School, now Clevelands Nursery and Preparatory School (1877)
- Trinity Methodist Church, Harrogate (1879)
- New Wesleyan Chapel, Earlestown (1879)
