= Greig & Beadon's Patent Light Railway =

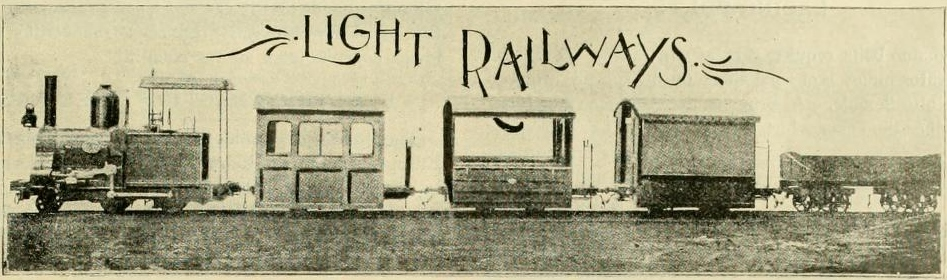
Greig & Beadon's patent light railway locomotive and rolling stock

Greig & Beadon's Patent Light Railway was a patented system of narrow gauge locomotives and rolling stock.

== History ==
Locomotives built by John Fowler for light railway systems had small wheels and as a result apparently suffered initially from their working parts being too near to the ground, and so being exposed to dust and dirt. In July 1880, his employees Alfred Greig and William Beadon were granted a patent for a locomotive with a jackshaft drive, which meant the cylinders could be raised much further above the track. It had very short vertical coupling rod from the jackshaft to the rear axle just below it; the rod was cranked to allow the valve eccentrics to be mounted inboard of the crank. The gearing arrangement had been patented, which regulated the speed and movement of the engine.

In South Africa, India, Australia, China, the Straits Settlements, West Indies, Hawaiian Islands and other places, the gauge was 2 ft (610 mm) to 2 ft 6 in (762 mm), the locomotives weighed 7 or 8 tons and could carry safely a load of 80 tons at a speed of 10 miles per hour (16 km/h). A light railway of still narrower gauge to connect farms with a main line of light railway could be built for $1,000 a mile while offering great benefit to farmers, if there was plenty of produce to be carried. Under the Greig system of light railways the cost was $5,000 a mile outside of England, while in England the cost was increased to $7,500 to $10,000 a mile, on account of preliminary Parliamentary expenses and increased cost of right of way.

Approximately eleven of these jackshaft drive locomotives were delivered to sugar plantations in the Hawaiian islands. The first Australian one was a 3 ft 6 in (1,067 mm) gauge example purchased by John Spiller for his River Estate in 1881. Airdmillan Mill in the Burdekin District imported a 2 ft (610 mm) gauge 0-4-2T Fowler Patent locomotive in 1882. In 1882, the Colonial Sugar Refining Company imported at least two Fowler Patent 2-4-0T locomotives for their new Victoria Mill. A 0-4-2T Patent locomotive imported by the Mourilyan Sugar Company in 1883 has been preserved at the Australian Sugar Museum, the only surviving example of its type in the world. In all, about a dozen Patent locomotives were imported by sugar mills in Queensland. Fowler patent locos 4666 to 4667 of 1883 were supplied to Chile via W. & J. Lockett, who were active agents and ship-owners in Chile and Peru.

Steam, gas, electricity and oil could be used to operate the engines. It was said that oil presented the advantage of freedom from noise, smoke and sparks, which was an important point when there are many stacks and hay fields along the line. Only one man was required to manage the engine, and, if the supply of oil ran short, a fresh supply could be got at almost every village through which the line ran. A great deal of interest has been taken in light railways, but certain proposed speed regulations have hampered promoters in getting capital interested.
