= Brunswick Mill, Ancoats =

Cotton mill in Manchester, England

Brunswick Mill
- The mill before 1951

- Location in Greater Manchester

Spinning (ring mill)
- Architectural style: Fireproof
- Location: Ancoats, Manchester, England
- Serving canal: Ashton Canal
- Owner: Henry Bannerman
- Further ownership: Lancashire Cotton Corporation (1930s); Courtaulds (1964)
- Coordinates: 53.4852°N 2.2143°W

Construction
- Built: 1840s
- Renovated: late 1800s; 1909

Design team
- Architect: David Bellhouse
- Structural engineer: William Fairbairn

Power
- Engine type: Beam then horizontal then electric

Equipment
- Mule Frames: 77000 (1850s)
- Ring Frames path: (1920s)

Brunswick Mill, Ancoats is a former cotton spinning mill on Bradford Road in Ancoats, Manchester, England. The mill was built around 1840, part of a group of mills built along the Ashton Canal, and at that time it was one of the country's largest mills. It was built round a quadrangle, a seven-storey block facing the canal. It was taken over by the Lancashire Cotton Corporation in the 1930s and passed to Courtaulds in 1964. Production finished in 1967.

It was a seven-storey mill with 35 loading bays facing directly onto the canal, with a smaller three/four-storey block of warehouses and offices backing onto Bradford Road. The Brunswick Mill was one of the largest in Britain at that time and by the 1850s held some 276 carding machines, and 77,000 mule spindles. 20 drawing frames, fifty slubbing frames and eighty one roving frames.

== Location ==
Ancoats is an inner city area of Manchester, in North West England, next to the Northern Quarter and the northern part of Manchester's commercial centre. Historically a part of Lancashire, Ancoats became one of the cradles of the Industrial Revolution, and has been called "the world's first industrial suburb". From the late-18th century, Ancoats became a thriving industrial district and from 1798 has been served by the Rochdale and Ashton Canals facilitating the movement of cotton, coal and finished goods. All Manchester's major railway stations were on the boundaries of Ancoats: Ancoats railway station on the Midland Railway, Ducie Street railway station and Manchester London Road railway station on the Great Central Railway, Cheshire Lines Committee, Oldham Road railway station and Victoria Station on the Manchester and Leeds Railway, Exchange station on the London and North Western Railway.

== Background ==
Surveying for the Rochdale Canal was carried out by James Brindley in 1765. The knowledge that its construction would make the transport of raw materials and finished goods more convenient, gave industrialists the confidence to build cotton mills. The first mills were built in Ancoats as early as 1790. In 1792 commissioners were appointed to improve the township of Manchester which included Ancoats. Towards the end of the 18th century steam power was used to power the cotton mills. Murray's Mills were built next to the Rochdale canal on Union Street (now Redhill Street) off Great Ancoats Street, by Adam and George Murray in 1798 and were known as Ancoats Mills when they were operated by McConnel & Company Ltd. The streets of Ancoats were laid out during the latter part of the 18th century, with little development taking place other than small houses and shops along Great Ancoats Street and Oldham Road. The Ashton Canal was linked to the Rochdale Canal at the Piccadilly Basin in 1798.

From the opening of the canals, development of mills continued on a much larger scale. Mills in Ancoats included, Victoria Mills, Wellington Mill, Brunswick Mill, India Mills, Dolton Mills, Lonsdale Mills, Phoenix Mill, Lloydsfield Mill and Sedgewick Mill, Decker Mill (owned by the Murray brothers), New Mill, Beehive Mill, Little Mill, Paragon Mill, Royal Mill and Pin Mill.

The mill structure was classified as a Grade II listed building in June 1994.

=== Power ===
- Double beam
- Horizontal
- Electricity

=== Equipment ===
The Brunswick Mill was one of the largest in Britain at that time and by the 1850s held some 276 carding machines, and 77,000 mule spindles, 20 drawing frames, fifty slubbing frames and eighty one roving frames.

== Owners ==
- George Bannerman
- Lancashire Cotton Corporation (1930s–1964)
- Courtaulds
- Maryland Securities

The building is now used by a variety of businesses.

== See also ==
- Listed buildings in Manchester-M40
- Textile manufacturing

== Bibliography ==
- Dunkerley, Philip (2009). "Dunkerley-Tuson Family Website, The Regent Cotton Mill, Failsworth". Archived from the original on 23 March 2008.
- LCC (1951). The mills and organisation of the Lancashire Cotton Corporation Limited. Blackfriars House, Manchester: Lancashire Cotton Corporation Limited.
- Roberts, A S (1921), "Arthur Robert's Engine List", Arthur Roberts Black Book., One guy from Barlick-Book Transcription, archived from the original on 23 July 2011
- Williams, Mike; Farnie, D.A. (1992). Cotton Mills of Greater Manchester. Carnegie Publishing. ISBN 0-948789-89-1.
