= Jim McMahon (politician) =

British politician (born 1980)

Jim McMahon OBE MP
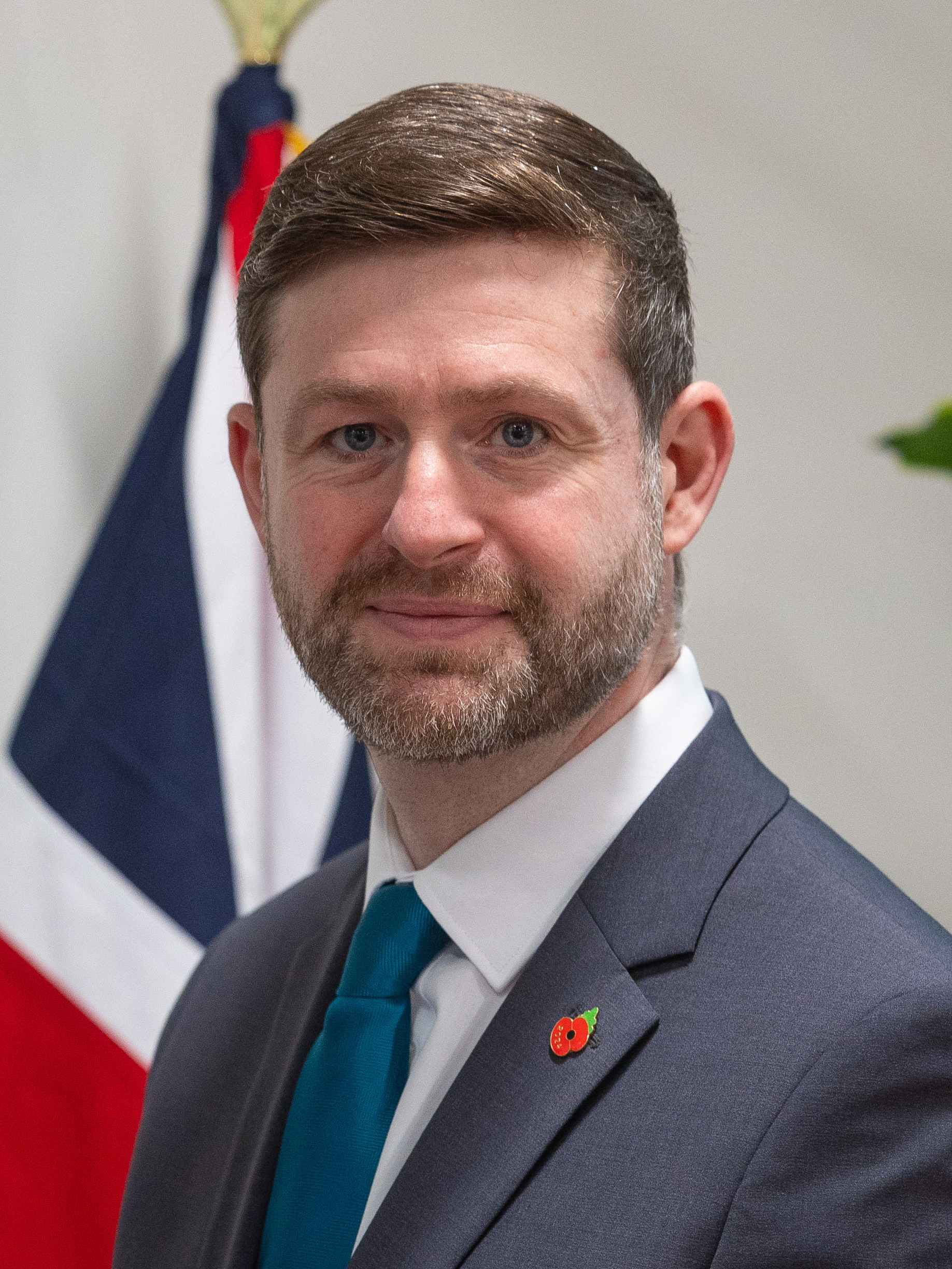
- Official portrait, 2024

Parliamentary Under-Secretary of State for Local Government, Devolution and Regional Growth (Note: Minister of State for Local Government and English Devolution 2024 to 2025)
- Incumbent
- Assumed office 22 July 2026
- Prime Minister: Andy Burnham
- Preceded by: Alison McGovern (Local Government); Nesil Caliskan (Devolution and Local Growth)
- In office 6 July 2024 – 6 September 2025
- Prime Minister: Keir Starmer
- Preceded by: Simon Hoare
- Succeeded by: Alison McGovern (Local Government); Miatta Fahnbulleh (Devolution)

Member of Parliament for Oldham West, Chadderton and Royton Oldham West and Royton (2015–2024)
- Incumbent
- Assumed office 3 December 2015
- Preceded by: Michael Meacher
- Majority: 4,976 (12.9%)
Shadow portfolios
Shadow Secretary of State
2021–2023	Environment, Food and Rural Affairs
2020–2021	Transport
Shadow Minister
2023–2024	English Devolution and Local Government
2016–2020	Local Government

Chair of the Co-operative Party
- Incumbent
- Assumed office 3 October 2020
- Preceded by: Chris Herries

Leader of Oldham Council
- In office 5 May 2011 – 16 January 2016
- Preceded by: Howard Sykes
- Succeeded by: Jean Stretton

Member of Oldham Council for Failsworth East
- In office 20 November 2003 – January 2017
- Preceded by: Charles Glover
- Succeeded by: Paul Jaques

Personal details
- Born: James Ignatius O'Rourke McMahon; 7 July 1980 (age 46) Miles Platting, Manchester, England
- Party: Labour Co-op
- Website: jimmcmahon.co.uk

James Ignatius O'Rourke McMahon OBE (born 7 July 1980) is a British politician who has served as Parliamentary Under-Secretary of State for Local Government, Devolution and Regional Growth since July 2026, having previously served as Minister of State for Local Government and English Devolution from July 2024 to September 2025. A member of Labour Co-op, he has served as Member of Parliament (MP) for Oldham West and Royton since 2015 and as the Chair of the Co-operative Party since 2020.

McMahon was a Councillor from 2003 to 2017, serving as Leader of Oldham Metropolitan Borough Council from 2011 to 2016. He served in the shadow cabinet as Shadow Transport Secretary from 2020 to 2021, and Shadow Environment Secretary from 2021 to 2023.

== Early life and education ==
McMahon was born in Miles Platting, Manchester, to William McMahon, a lorry driver and Alicia O'Rourke (Breffni). The family moved from Cheetham Hill when he was a child to Middleton, where he attended secondary school. He left school at the age of sixteen.

== Professional career ==
McMahon started work in 1997 as an apprentice technician at Manchester University, rising to become a senior technician before leaving in 2004. He then joined local government service as a regeneration officer and latterly as a town centre manager.

== Political career ==
=== Local government ===
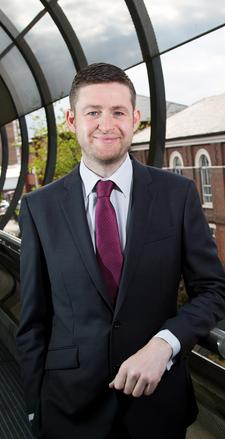
McMahon in 2015

McMahon was first elected as a Member of Oldham Metropolitan Borough Council for Failsworth East in a by-election on 20 November 2003. He held various posts on Oldham Council before becoming the council's Labour group leader in 2008 after the Liberal Democrats won control of the authority. At the 2011 local elections, Labour re-gained control of the council and McMahon became its leader. As council leader McMahon sat as one of the 11 members of the Greater Manchester Combined Authority with responsibility for transport.

McMahon was the inaugural chairman of the Co-operative Council Innovation Network and served as the Labour leader of the Local Government Association. McMahon was named the 6th most influential person in local government by The Local Government Chronicle ahead of senior government ministers.

In August 2014, McMahon was elected to represent Labour councillors on the party's National Executive Committee (NEC).

In the 2015 Labour leadership election, McMahon was reported to have supported Liz Kendall's leadership bid.

In 2016, McMahon stood down as council leader and was replaced by his Deputy, Jean Stretton. He resigned his council seat in 2017, triggering a by-election on 16 February 2017.

=== Parliament ===
McMahon won the selection to be Labour Party candidate at the 2015 Oldham West and Royton by-election following the death of incumbent Michael Meacher. At the by-election held on 3 December 2015, McMahon was elected Member of Parliament for Oldham West and Royton, with 62% of the vote – an increase of seven percentage points since the 2015 general election. At the by-election McMahon represented just the Labour Party rather than his later Labour and Co-operative Party affiliation.

He served as parliamentary private secretary to the Deputy Leader of the Labour Party until being appointed to serve as Shadow Minister for Local Government and Devolution. He supported Owen Smith in the failed attempt to replace Jeremy Corbyn in the 2016 Labour leadership election.

Following Keir Starmer's election as Leader of the Labour Party, McMahon was appointed Shadow Secretary of State for Transport. On 29 November 2021, he was reshuffled to the role of Shadow Secretary of State for Environment, Food and Rural Affairs. He has sat on Labour's National Executive Committee on behalf of the shadow frontbench. He resigned his post on 4 September 2023 ahead of that day's shadow cabinet reshuffle, citing ill health, but returned to the frontbench as Shadow Minister for English Devolution and Local Government in November 2023, replacing Sarah Owen as Shadow Minister for Local Government and Paula Barker as Shadow Minister for Devolution, both of whom resigned from the frontbench after defying the whip to vote for an SNP motion calling for a ceasefire in Gaza. On 22 July 2026 he was appointed Parliamentary Under-Secretary of State in the Ministry of Housing, Communities and Local Government in the new government of Prime Minister Andy Burnham.

==== Votes at 16 ====
On being selected to present a Private Member's Bill, McMahon moved the Representation of the People (Young People's Enfranchisement and Education) Bill 2017–19, which sought to extend the franchise across the United Kingdom to eligible voters aged 16 and 17. The bill included measures to introduce citizenship and the constitution education in schools. The bill received its Second Reading in November 2017, but did not progress any further. It led to the establishment of the cross-party All-Party Parliamentary Group on Votes at 16.

== Personal life ==
McMahon lives with Charlene Duerden in Failsworth. They have two children.

== Honours and distinctions ==
In February 2014, McMahon was named "Council Leader of the Year" during the Councillor Achievement Awards hosted by the Local Government Information Unit. He was credited with leading improvements in Oldham Metropolitan Borough Council having redesignated it as a Co-operative Council. Also in 2014, University Centre Oldham conferred upon him Honorary Fellowship, as well as being elected a Fellow of the Royal Society of Arts (FRSA).

McMahon was appointed Officer of the Order of the British Empire (OBE) in the 2015 Birthday Honours for "services to the community in Oldham", and was invested by Prince Charles, on 18 December 2015.

In November 2017, he was named as the Youth Voice Champion by the British Youth Council following his work on the Votes at 16 campaign.

== Notes ==
Political offices
Preceded by Howard Sykes	Leader of Oldham Council; 2011–2016	Succeeded by Jean Stretton
Preceded by Steve Reed	Shadow Minister for Local Government; 2016–2020	Succeeded by Kate Hollern
Preceded by Andy McDonald	Shadow Secretary of State for Transport; 2020–2021	Succeeded by Louise Haigh
Preceded by Luke Pollard	Shadow Secretary of State for Environment, Food and Rural Affairs; 2021–2023	Succeeded by Steve Reed
Parliament of the United Kingdom
Preceded by Michael Meacher	Member of Parliament for Oldham West and Royton; 2015–2024	Constituency abolished
New constituency	Member of Parliament for Oldham West, Chadderton and Royton; 2024–present	Incumbent
Party political offices
Preceded by Chris Herries	Chair of the Co-operative Party; 2020–present	Succeeded by Meg Hillier
