= Listed buildings in Manchester-M40 =

Manchester is a city in Northwest England. The M40 postcode area is to the northeast of the city centre, and includes parts of the districts of Miles Platting, Clayton, and Moston. This postcode area contains 13 listed buildings that are recorded in the National Heritage List for England. Of these, one is listed at Grade II*, the middle of the three grades, and the others are at Grade II, the lowest grade. The area is partly industrial and partly residential. Until the Industrial Revolution, it was rural and one listed building, Hough Hall, has survived from this time. The industrial buildings are textile mills, some of which have been converted for other uses. The area includes Phillips Park Cemetery, and four structures associated with it are included in the list. The other listed buildings are churches and associated structures.

== Key ==
Grade	Criteria
II*	Particularly important buildings of more than special interest
II	Buildings of national importance and special interest

== Buildings ==
Name and location	Photograph	Date	Notes	Grade
Hough Hall; 53.51324°N 2.20173°W		Late 16th or early 17th century	A former farmhouse, timber framed with brick infill on a stone plinth and with a roof partly in slate and partly with corrugated sheet. It has two storeys and an L-shaped plan with a three-bay gabled main range, and a two-bay cross-wing at the east projecting to the south. At the south end is a large external chimney stack, and next to is it a narrow projecting entrance bay. Most of the windows have been altered, and on the north side an entrance has been inserted.	II
All Saints Church, Newton Heath; 53.50011°N 2.17766°W		1814–15	The church was enlarged in 1844, and the chancel added in 1880. It is in sandstone, and consists of a nave, north and south aisles, a chancel, and a west tower flanked by stair turrets. The tower has two stages, polygonal buttresses, an arched west doorway, a west window, a band of blank arcading, clock faces, and on the top are polygonal corner turrets and a parapet, all embattled. The stair turrets have two storeys, chamfered corners and embattled parapets. Along the sides of the church are two tiers of windows and parapets are embattled. The east window has five lights and contains Perpendicular tracery.	II
Churchyard railings and gateway, All Saints Church, Newton Heath; 53.49909°N 2.17709°W	—	1815 (probable)	The railings are in cast iron and surround the west, north and east sides of the churchyard. They have a continuous arcade of trefoiled arches. There are wrought iron gates on all three sides, and each has an ogee overthrow.	II
Newton Silk Mill; 53.50224°N 2.18082°W		1832	The mill is in pink brick with sandstone lintels, and has a rectangular plan with a stair tower on the west side. There are four storeys, an attic and a basement, and five bays. On the front is a flat-topped gable containing a large lunette. Between the second and third floors is a dated and lettered plaque.	II
Brunswick Mill; 53.48519°N 2.21465°W		c. 1840	A cotton mill in brick with slate roofs, it is built around a central courtyard. The main block, for spinning, is along the canal, and has seven storeys and 28 bays. The side wings were used for a variety of purposes, they have seven storeys and six bays. Along the road the block used for offices and warehousing has four storeys and 20 bays. In the courtyard is an external engine house. There is a central entrance with a segmental head, and the windows are small and rectangular with flat-arched heads.	II
Chapel, Phillips Park Cemetery; 53.49064°N 2.19812°W		1867	The chapel is in sandstone with a slate roof, and is in Decorated style. It consists of a nave, a south aisle, a southwest porch, a chancel with an apse, and a southeast steeple. The porch has a doorway with a pointed arch, a moulded surround, and shafts. The windows have pointed heads, in the aisle is an oculus, and there are gabled dormers on the roof.	II
Entrance lodge, Phillips Park Cemetery; 53.48963°N 2.20083°W		1867	The lodge is in sandstone with a slate roof, and has two storeys. There are two unequal bays, the left bay forming a square tower, and the right gabled. The left bay has an arched doorway, a lancet window above, a frieze, and a pyramidal roof with an apex finial. To the left is a curved stair turret. The right bay has a mullioned and transomed window with a hipped roof, above which is a cross-window.	II
Gates and railings, Phillips Park Cemetery; 53.48982°N 2.20081°W	—	1867	The gate piers and walls are in sandstone. There is a central large pier with a square base, corner marble shafts with pinnacles, and a crocketed spire with an apex cross. The roadways are flanked by smaller piers, and curved walls lead to end piers with pyramidal roofs. The gates and railings are in wrought iron.	II
Office, Phillips Park Cemetery; 53.49000°N 2.20062°W		1867	The office is in sandstone with a slate roof, and is in two parts. The left part has two storeys, a central tower and three bays. The tower is square with a diagonal buttress, a segmental-headed doorway, a foliated cornice, clock faces, and a pyramidal roof with lucarnes and a finial. The wing to the right has a single storey, three bays, cross-windows, a hipped roof, and a rear wing of four bays with a hipped dormer.	II
Victoria Mill; 53.48994°N 2.21404°W		1869	A double cotton spinning mill, the second phase built in 1873. The mill is in red brick with dressings in yellow brick. It has a U-shaped plan, with the two mills joined in the centre by the engine house. In the centre of this is the stair tower, wrapped around the chimney, and at the rear is the boiler house. Each mill has six storeys, and sides of 11 and 10 bays. The windows on the top storey have round heads, and the others have segmental heads.	II*
Corpus Christi Basilica; 53.49242°N 2.21387°W		1905–06	A Roman Catholic church in red brick with sandstone dressings and a slate roof, in Italian Romanesque style. It consists of a nave with a clerestory, north and south aisles, a chancel with an apsidal sanctuary, and at the west end is the base of an uncompleted tower and a baptistry. At the west end is a gabled portal containing a round-headed doorway with triple shafts and a traceried tympanum. Above this is a band of six round-headed lancet windows, a semicircular window with a statue in a canopied niche, and a gable containing another statue in a niche. Projecting from the base of the tower is an apsidal baptistry with an arcade of round-headed windows with shafts. Along the sides of the church are arcades of blank arches, and round-headed windows above.	II
St Wilfrid and St Ann's Church, Newton Heath; 53.50206°N 2.19061°W		1909	The church was designed by Austin and Paley in Perpendicular style with Arts and Crafts features. It is in red brick with sandstone dressings and a slate roof. The church consists of a nave with a clerestory, aisles incorporating porches, a chancel and a bell turret. The south front is gabled, and has a tall canted bay window and a chequered stone parapet. To the left is the bell turret in the form of a slab, with blind tracery and an open bell arch. Above the left doorway is a niche, and over the right doorway is an oculus.	II
St Dunstan's Church, Moston; 53.51435°N 2.19576°W		1937	A Roman Catholic church in brown brick with stone bands, dressings in red brick and tiled roofs. It is in Romanesque style, and consists of a nave, flat-roofed aisles, transepts, and an apsidal sanctuary flanked by chapels. There is a low octagonal tower at the crossing with oculi on alternate faces, and another tower at the southeast, which is square with a segmental-headed doorway, very small windows and a pyramidal roof. The south front is gabled and contains a segmental-headed doorway, above which is a tall round-headed lancet window and a statue in a niche.	II
