= Coldhurst =

Coordinates: 53.548981°N 2.118491°W

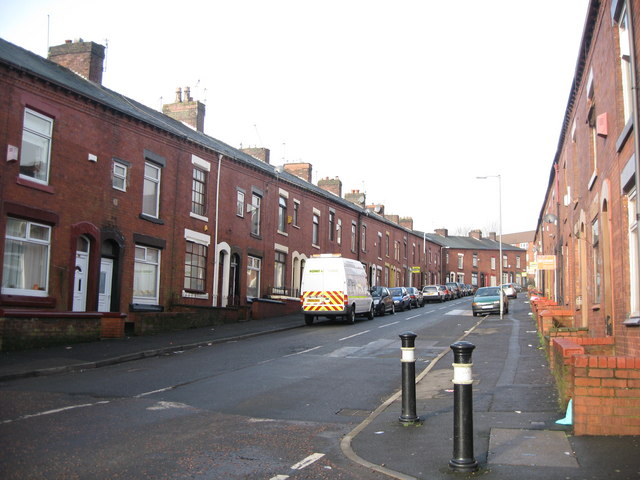
- Horsedge Street in Coldhurst

- Location within Greater Manchester
- Population: 13,201 (2011 Census)
  - Density: 58.1
- OS grid reference: SD921058
- Metropolitan borough: Oldham
- Metropolitan county: Greater Manchester
- Region: North West
- Country: England
- Sovereign state: United Kingdom
- Post town: OLDHAM
- Postcode district: OL1
- Dialling code: 0161
- Police: Greater Manchester
- Fire: Greater Manchester
- Ambulance: North West
- UK Parliament: Oldham West and Royton

Coldhurst (or more rarely Cold Hurst) is an area of Oldham and an electoral ward of the wider Metropolitan Borough of Oldham in Greater Manchester, England. At the time of the United Kingdom Census 2001, it had a population of 11,935, increasing to 13,201 at the 2011 Census. The electoral ward spans most of Oldham's town centre, although the name Coldhurst conventionally applies to the area immediately north of the centre. The district of Westwood and a small adjoining part of Chadderton in the Busk area also lie within the Coldhurst ward district.

Historically a part of Lancashire, Coldhurst was formerly a chapelry within the ancient ecclesiastical parish of Prestwich-cum-Oldham, in the Salfordshire hundred.

An old hall existed in the locality belonging to Abram Crompton Esq, which gave its name to Crompton Street.

Coldhurst is said to have been the scene of an action in the English Civil War in which the parliamentarians were defeated.

Following the Industrial Revolution, Coldhurst was the site of considerable industry and commerce, including coal mining, cotton spinning and hat manufacture.

Coldhurst is the home of a significant community of South Asian (particularly Bangladeshi) heritage. 37% of the population is non-white and most of the white residents live in what have been described as "bleak council developments". In 2001, Coldhurst was in the 5% most deprived wards in the United Kingdom.

A photograph of Coldhurst during the Victorian era was used as part of the "Made of Manchester" promotion of the home strip worn by Manchester United F.C. for the 2012–13 season.
