= Corpus Christi Priory =

Catholic Premonstratensian priory in Manchester, England

Coordinates: 53°29′33″N 2°12′54″W

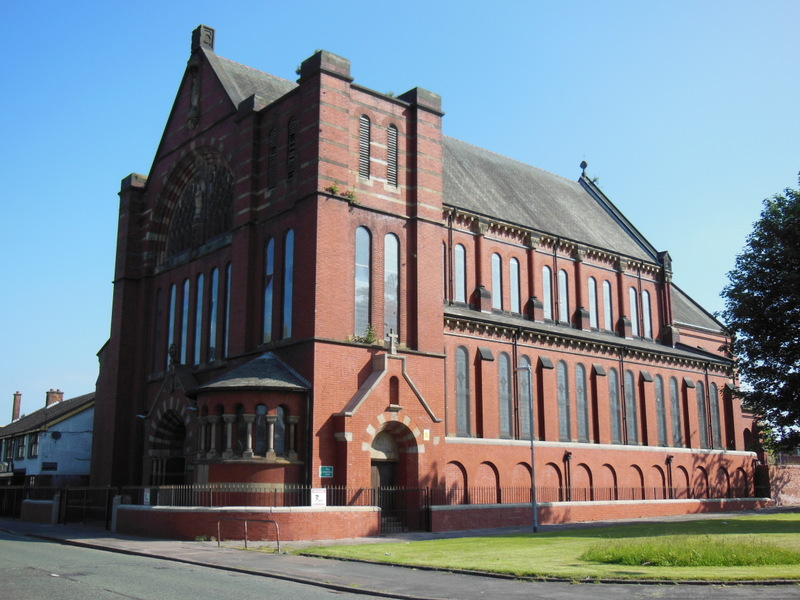
- Corpus Christi Priory
- Corpus Christi Priory
- OS grid reference: SJ 85913 99546
- Location: Varley Street, Miles Platting, Manchester
- Country: England
- Denomination: Premonstratensians

Architecture
- Functional status: Closed
- Heritage designation: Grade II
- Architectural type: Church

Corpus Christi Priory was a Catholic Premonstratensian priory in Manchester, England.

== The church ==
The Norbertine canons regular first came to Manchester in 1889 from the Belgian Abbey of Tongerlo and they built Corpus Christi Basilica in the Miles Platting area of the city. The church was designed by William Telford Gunson. Its foundation stone was laid on 14 July 1906 by Bishop Louis Charles Casartelli, and the church was opened the following year on 5 November 1907. The basilica was later designated a Grade II listed building.

Corpus Christi became an independent canonry of the Premonstratensian order in 2004. The Norbertine canons continued to serve there until 2007, when mounting repair and maintenance costs forced its closure. The final Mass was celebrated on 27 April 2007. The community initially relocated to St Chad's, Cheetham Hill, then to Our Lady Immaculate Church, Chelmsford, Essex, in 2008.

== See also ==
- Listed buildings in Manchester-M40
