= The Brooklyn, Bolton =

Listed former pub in Greater Manchester, England

The Brooklyn
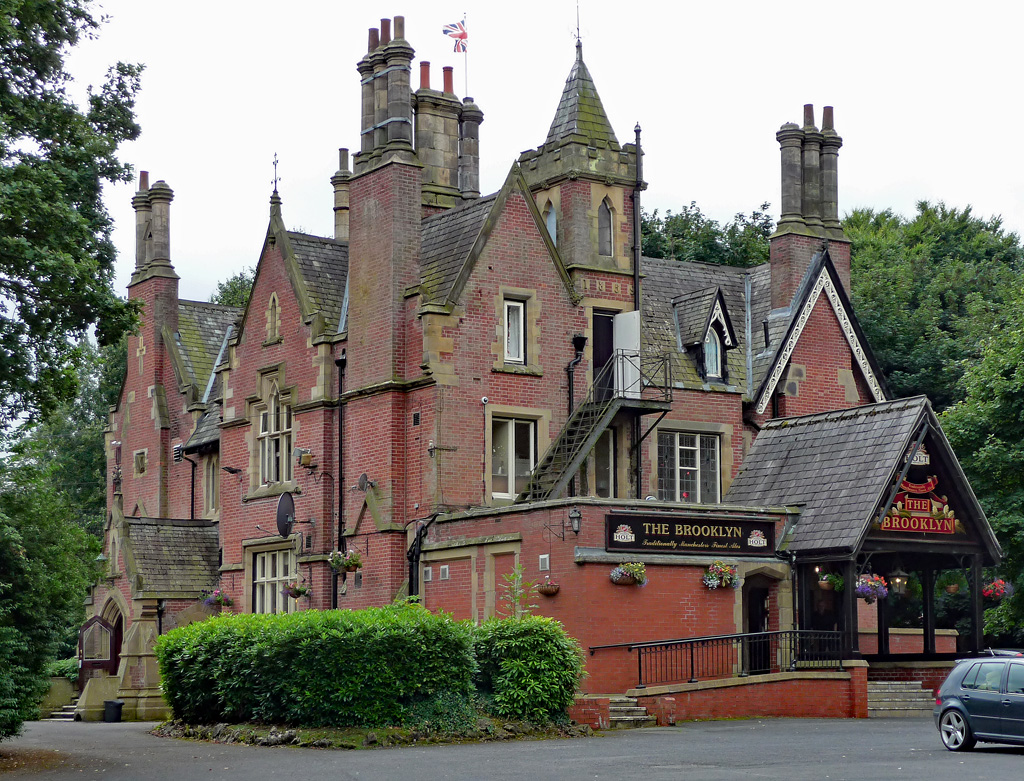
- The building in 2017

- Location within Greater Manchester
- Former names: Brooklyn Hotel
- Alternative names: Lord's Independent School

General information
- Type: House (1859–?); Public house (?–2019); Independent school (2019–present)
- Architectural style: Gothic
- Location: Green Lane, Great Lever, Bolton, Greater Manchester, England
- Coordinates: 53.5592°N 2.4234°W
- Year built: 1859; 167 years ago
- Client: Thomas Walmsley

Design and construction
- Architect: George Woodhouse
- Designations

Listed Building – Grade II
- Official name: The Brooklyn
- Designated: 26 April 1974
- Reference no.: 1388046

Listed Building – Grade II
- Official name: Former gatehouse to the Brooklyn
- Designated: 26 April 1974
- Reference no.: 1388047

Listed Building – Grade II
- Official name: Gate piers to the Brooklyn
- Designated: 26 April 1974
- Reference no.: 1388048

Website
- lordsschool.co.uk

The Brooklyn is a Grade II listed former public house on Green Lane in Great Lever, a suburb of Bolton, Greater Manchester, England. Designed by George Woodhouse in a Gothic style as a house and built in 1859, it was later converted into a pub and traded until 2019, after which it became an independent school.

== History ==
The building was designed by George Woodhouse for Thomas Walmsley in a Gothic style and was completed in 1859 as a private house.

The Ordnance Survey map published in 1895 labels the property as "Brooklyn", showing that the name was established by that date. By 1929 it had expanded its role and was operating as the Brooklyn Hotel, and the 1939 edition of the map also records a bowling green on the site.

On 26 April 1974, the Brooklyn was designated a Grade II listed building. The pub was recorded in 1979 as one of several Bolton houses that still retained bowling greens, and by 1981 it had become part of the Greenall Whitley estate. It stayed under that ownership until around 1996, when it was acquired by Holts. In 2007 and 2008, the Brooklyn was included in the Good Beer Guide.

The pub closed in May 2019, reportedly as a result of declining sales, and the property was subsequently bought by KYK Holdings, a company based in Wigan. It was later leased to the principal of Lord's Independent School and converted for educational use.

== Architecture ==
The building is constructed in brick with stone detailing and has a graded slate roof. It is designed in a Gothic style with an asymmetrical plan and has two storeys. The main entrance is on the side that forms part of the garden front. The doorway is set slightly off‑centre beneath a gabled porch with a tall arched opening. Above it is a small two‑part window, and to the right are two narrow pointed windows in a slim bay topped with battlements and a small stone spire.

The dormer gable rises over the right‑hand bay, which has a wide four‑part window on the ground floor and a three‑part window above. Prominent chimneys stand to the right and on the left‑hand gable, each with octagonal stone shafts. The garden front has a projecting square with renewed French windows and two two‑part windows to the right. On the upper floor there is a central oriel window, a pair of pointed windows to one side, and a renewed four‑part window to the other.

The west side is also irregular, forming a four‑window range. The wide gabled end of the garden front is on the right, with two and three‑part windows. A recessed bay next to it has a doorway aligned with the main entrance, with small pointed openings in the door and decorative carved panels above. A stepped window sits above the doorway, and the parapet has battlements with a stone and iron spire. To the left is a full‑height bay window, square below and angled above, with a four‑part lower window and carved stone divisions. Further left is a narrow bay with a two‑part pointed window on each floor and a steep gable with decorative bargeboards.

At the rear, two uneven gables flank a central tower with a battlemented top and a pyramidal roof. The tower carries raised lettering with the initials "T. S. W." below the parapet. Single‑storey service additions, likely from the early 20th century, stand to one side. Some original features survive internally, including the Jacobean‑style plaster ceilings and the staircase.

== Associated gatehouse and gate piers ==
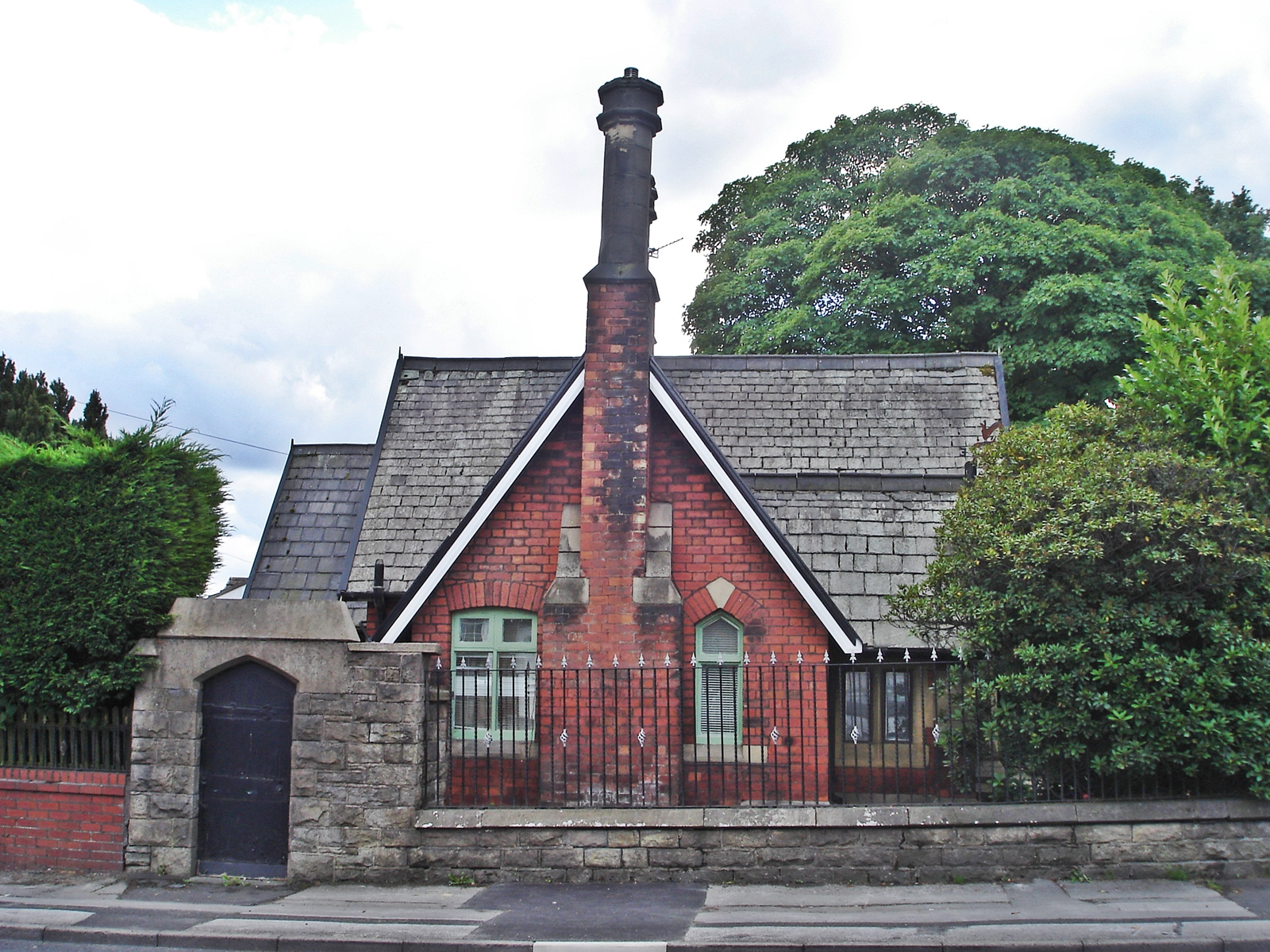
The former gatehouse

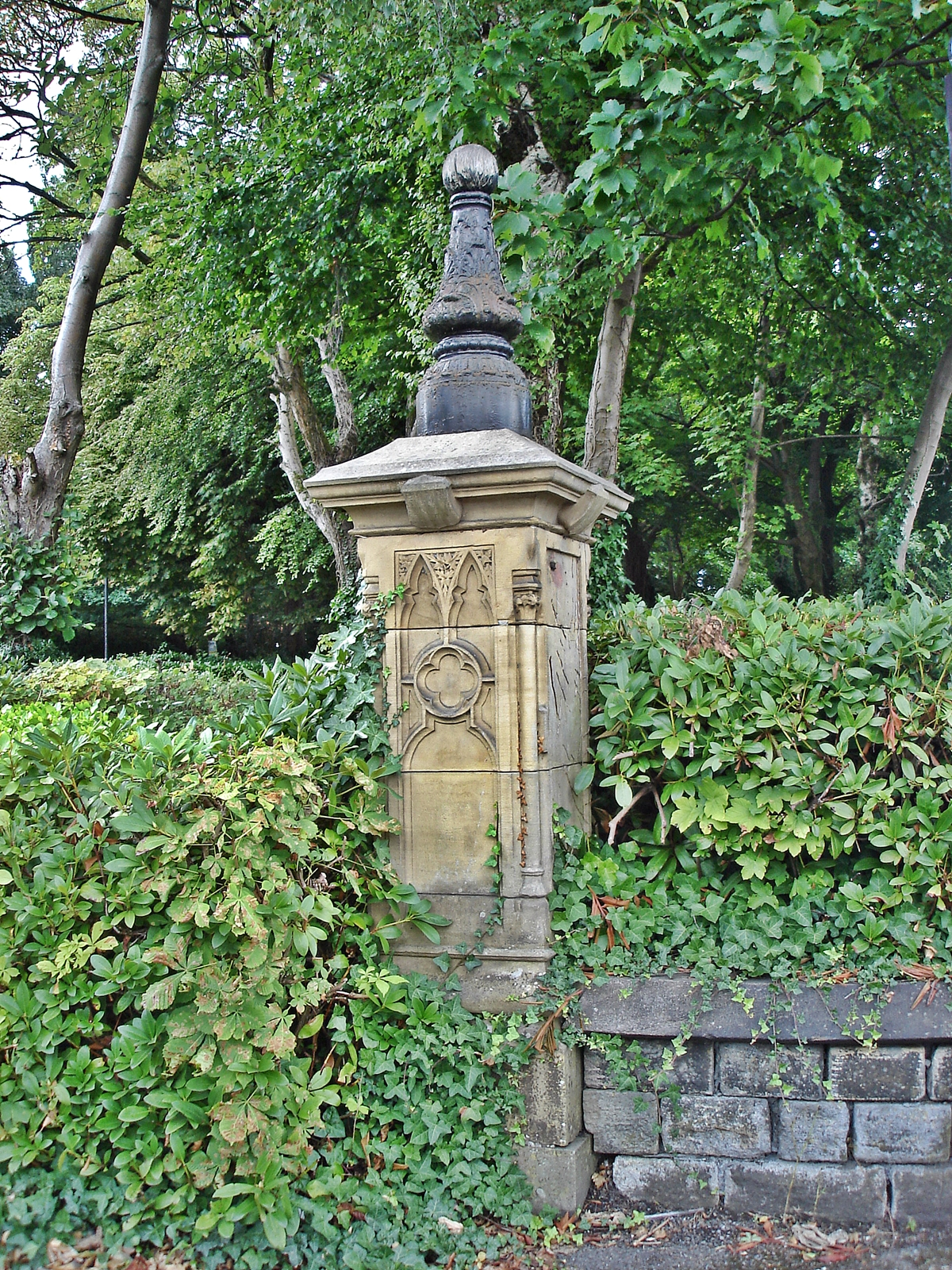
Gate pier

The former gatehouse to the Brooklyn is also Grade II listed and dates from around 1859. Built of brick with a slate roof, it is a single‑storey structure on a cross‑shaped plan. The street-facing gable carries a prominent chimney with octagonal stone shafts, while the entrance sits in a gabled porch projecting from the west side and is framed by a tall arched opening. To the right of the porch, the forward‑facing gable of the cross‑wing contains a four‑part window set within a square bay.

A pair of Grade II‑listed gate piers, also dating from about 1859, stand at the entrance on Green Lane. They are of stone, square in plan with panelled faces and sloping caps, each topped with a cast‑iron lamp base finished with acanthus‑style ornament.

== See also ==
- Listed buildings in Bolton
- Listed pubs in Greater Manchester
