= 2015 Oldham West and Royton by-election =

2015 by-election, first of the 56th UK Parliament

- 3 December 2015

Oldham West and Royton constituency
- Turnout: 40.3%
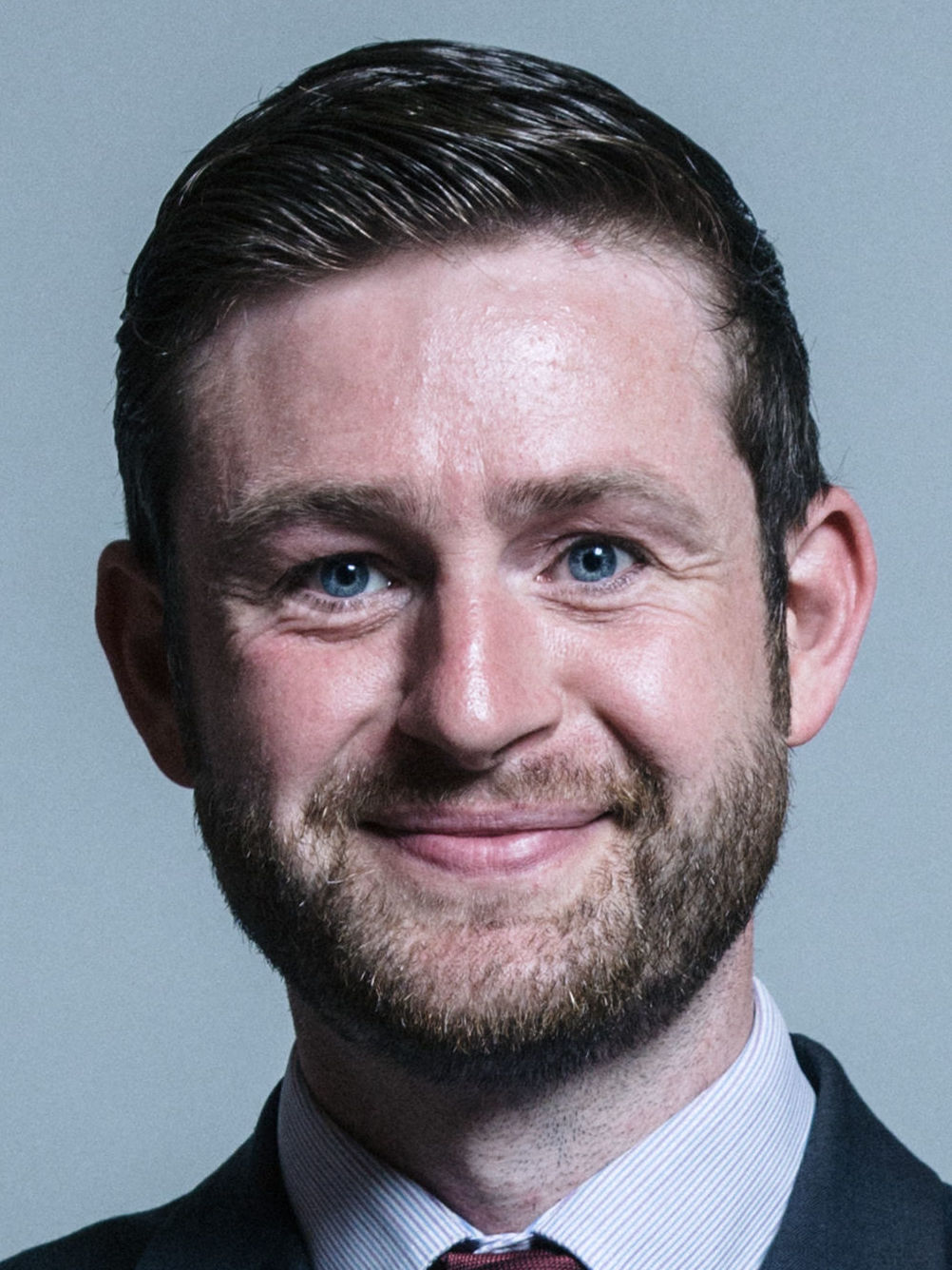

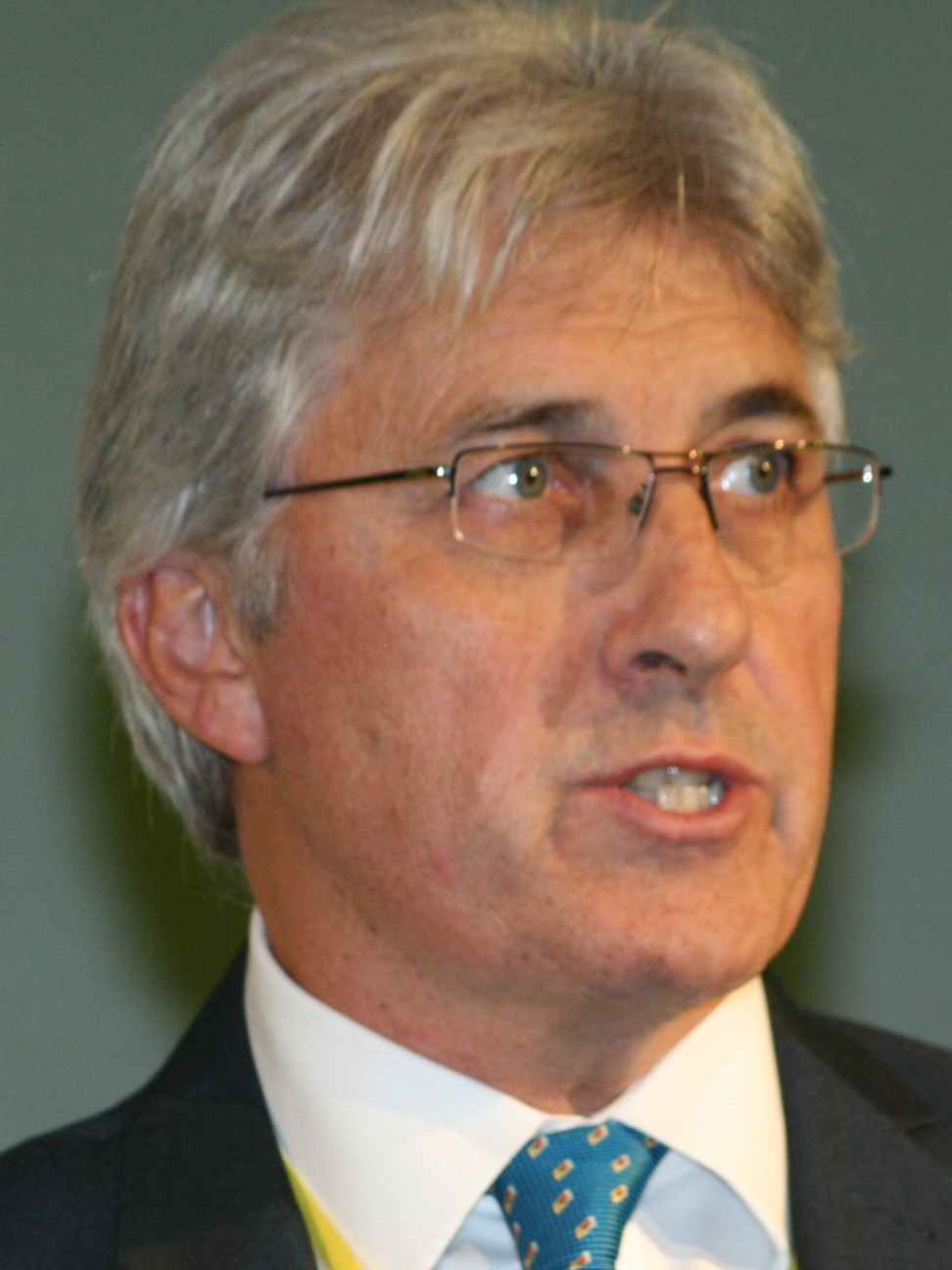

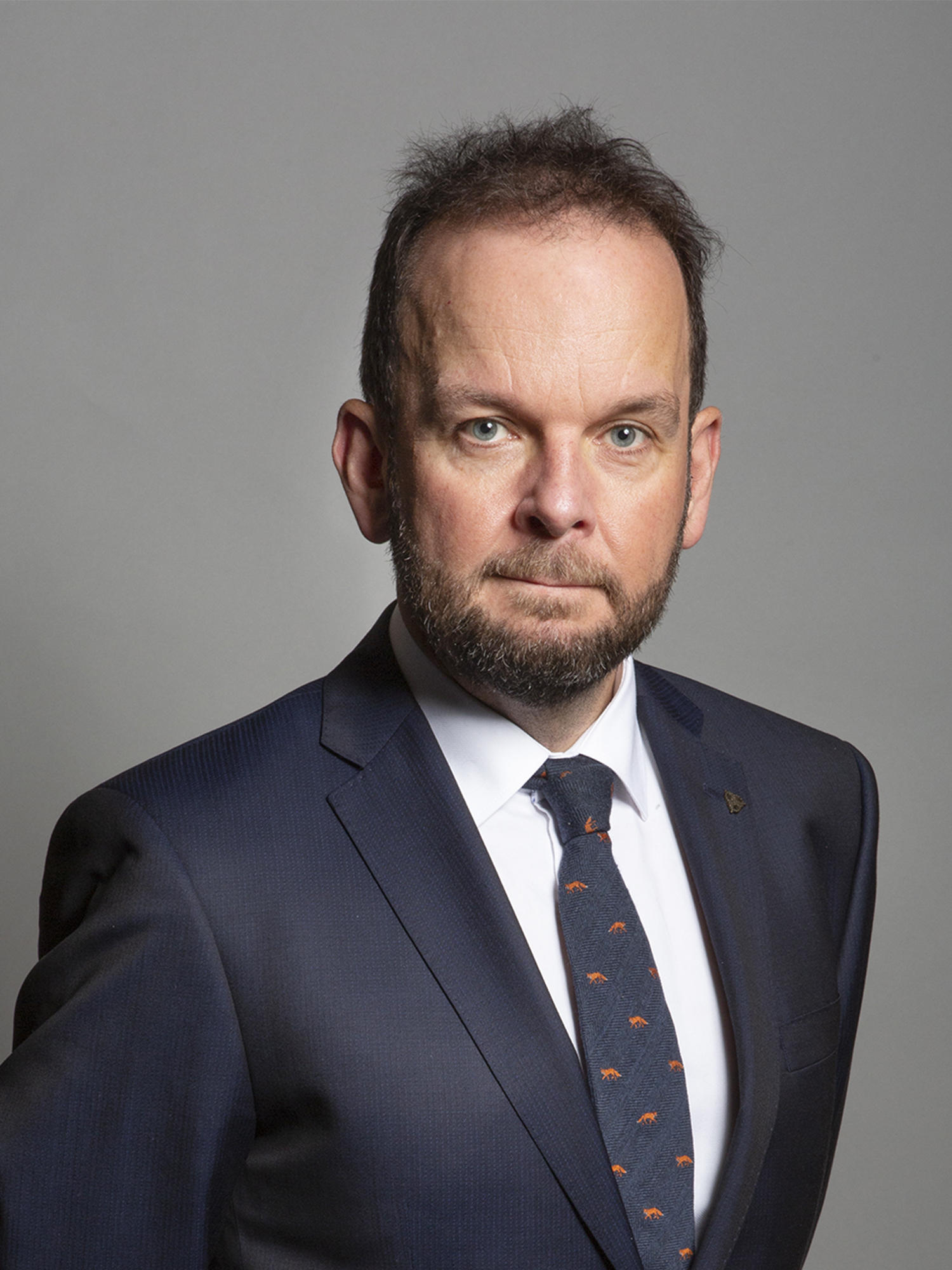
	First party	Second party	Third party
Candidate	Jim McMahon	John Bickley	James Daly
Party	Labour	UKIP	Conservative
Popular vote	17,209	6,487	2,596
Percentage	62.1%	23.4%	9.4%
Swing	▲7.3 pp	▲2.8 pp	▼9.6 pp
MP before election
Michael Meacher
Labour
Elected MP
Jim McMahon
Labour

A by-election for the United Kingdom parliamentary constituency of Oldham West and Royton was held on 3 December 2015, following the death of incumbent Labour Party Member of Parliament (MP) Michael Meacher. Jim McMahon held the seat for Labour with a winning 62% of the vote, an increase of 7.3 percentage points.

This was the first of ten by-elections held in the 2015–2017 parliament.

== Background and candidates ==
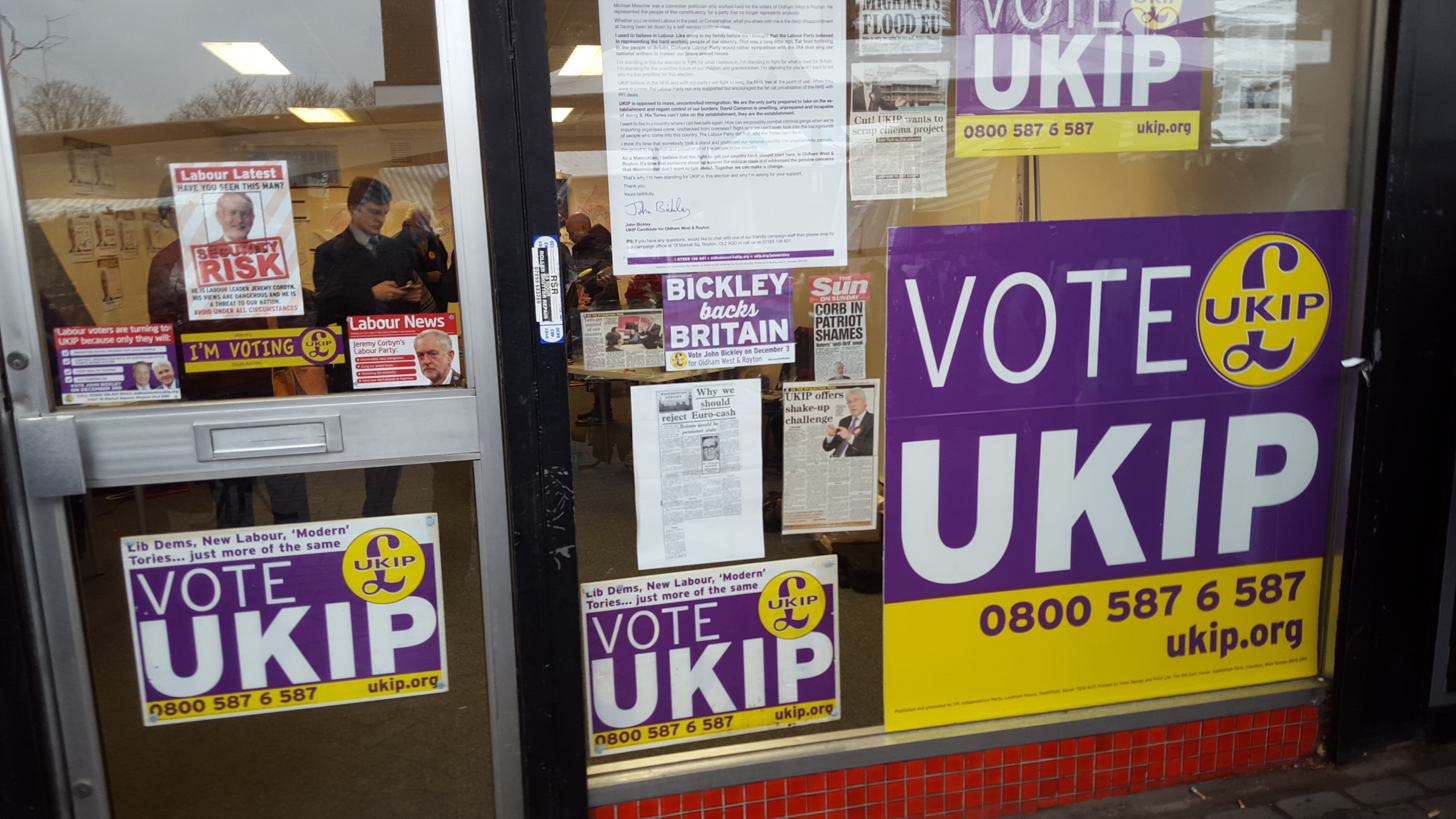
UKIP office for the Oldham By-election

The by-election was caused by the death of the sitting Member of Parliament (MP) Michael Meacher on 21 October 2015; Meacher had been the Labour Party MP for the seat since its creation in 1997 and had represented its predecessor seat of Oldham West since 1970.

A writ for the by-election was moved in Parliament on 2 November 2015, setting polling day as 3 December 2015.

Six candidates contested the election; the statement of persons nominated was released by Oldham Council on 9 November 2015.

The Labour Party, which last held the seat, selected its candidate on 5 November 2015 from a shortlist of four: Mohammed Azam, National Executive Committee member and former local councillor; Jane East, who contested the seat of Colne Valley unsuccessfully at the 2015 general election; Failsworth East councillor Jim McMahon, leader of Oldham Council; and Chris Williamson, former MP for Derby North. McMahon won the selection, reportedly with 232 votes against 141 for Azam in the final round, after the elimination of East and Williamson.

UK Independence Party (UKIP) came second in the constituency at the 2015 general election and fielded a new candidate, John Bickley, who was runner-up at the by-election held in 2014 in the neighbouring constituency of Heywood and Middleton. Others talked about as potential candidates were Paul Nuttall, the UKIP deputy leader, and Steven Woolfe, both MEPs for North West England.

The Conservative Party came a close third to UKIP at the 2015 general election and selected James Daly, a solicitor and Bury councillor, who contested the Bolton North East constituency in 2015. He was Member of Parliament for Bury North after being elected in the 2019 general election and lost in the 2024 general election.

The Liberal Democrat candidate was Jane Brophy, who works for the NHS in Greater Manchester and has served as a Trafford councillor for over 15 years; she was LibDem candidate for Altrincham and Sale West at the 2010 and 2015 general elections.

Simeon Hart stood for the Green Party, having contested the constituency for the Greens at the 2015 general election.

Sir Oink A-Lot stood for the Official Monster Raving Loony Party.

== Result ==
2015 Oldham West and Royton by-election
Party	Candidate	Votes	%	±%
Labour	Jim McMahon	17,209	62.1	+7.3
UKIP	John Bickley	6,487	23.4	+2.8
Conservative	James Daly	2,596	9.4	–9.6
Liberal Democrats	Jane Brophy	1,024	3.7	0.0
Green	Simeon Hart	249	0.9	–1.0
Monster Raving Loony	Sir Oink A-Lot	141	0.5	New
Majority		10,722	38.7	+4.5
Turnout		27,706	40.3	–19.3
Labour hold		Swing	+2.3	

== Aftermath ==
The result was considered by commentators as surprisingly good for Labour, who had been expected to be more closely challenged by UKIP. It was also reported as a boost for Jeremy Corbyn's leadership of the party.

On the morning after the by-election, UKIP leader Nigel Farage and some other party sources claimed that there had been voting fraud particularly around ethnic minority voters and around postal votes, with Farage claiming the vote was "bent" and that in constituencies with large numbers of ethnic minority voters who do not speak English, "effectively the electoral process is now dead". Paul Nuttall, UKIP's deputy leader, said to journalists: "You've got to ask yourself, is this Britain or is this Harare?" However, others in UKIP downplayed the allegations, with deputy chairman Suzanne Evans saying the party risks sounding like "bad losers". Tom Watson, Labour's deputy leader, dismissed the complaints as "sour grapes".

Farage stated that he was planning to make a formal complaint about the allegations. Nuttall wrote an open letter to Greg Clark, the Secretary of State for the Department for Communities and Local Government, raising concerns about postal voting processes.

== Previous result ==
General election 2015: Oldham West and Royton
Party	Candidate	Votes	%	±%
Labour	Michael Meacher	23,630	54.8	+9.3
UKIP	Francis Arbour	8,892	20.6	+17.4
Conservative	Kamran Ghafoor	8,187	19.0	–4.7
Liberal Democrats	Garth Harkness	1,589	3.7	–15.4
Green	Simeon Hart	839	1.9	New
Majority		14,738	34.2	+12.4
Turnout		43,137	59.6	+0.5
Labour hold		Swing	–4.0	

== See also ==
- Oldham
- Royton
- 1968 Oldham West by-election
- List of United Kingdom by-elections (2010–present)
- Parliament of the United Kingdom
