= St Wilfrid and St Ann's Church, Newton Heath =

Coordinates: 53.5059°N 2.1712°W

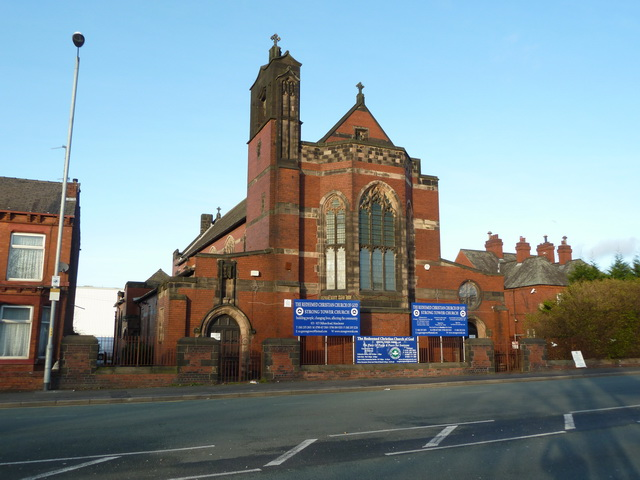

- Location in Greater Manchester
- OS grid reference: SD 875,006
- Location: Oldham Road, Newton Heath, Greater Manchester
- Country: England
- Denomination: Anglican

History
- Status: Former parish church

Architecture
- Functional status: Redundant
- Heritage designation: Grade II
- Designated: 20 June 1988
- Architect: Austin and Paley
- Architectural type: Church
- Style: Gothic Revival
- Completed: 1909
- Closed: 1997

Specifications
- Materials: Brick, sandstone dressings Slate roofs

St Wilfrid and St Ann's Church is in Oldham Road, Newton Heath, Greater Manchester, England. It is a redundant Anglican parish church, which is recorded in the National Heritage List for England as a designated Grade II listed building.

== History ==
The church was built in 1909–10, and designed by the Lancaster architects Austin and Paley, providing seating for 504 people. It was closed for worship in 1997 and declared redundant on 1 December.

== Architecture ==
Constructed in glazed red brick, the church has sandstone dressings and slate roofs. Its architectural style is Perpendicular with Arts and Crafts features. The authors of the Buildings of England series state that it is "typical of the later work of the [Austin and Paley] practice". The church is orientated north–south, its plan consisting of a four-bay nave with clerestory, aisles that incorporate porches in their south ends, and a two-bay chancel. At the northeast corner of the nave is a bell tower, with its narrow side on the south. The lower part of the tower is in brick, and the top stage is stone, with blind tracery on the front and bell openings on the sides. At the centre of the south end of the nave is a tall canted bay containing transomed traceried windows. Above the bay is a chequered stone parapet. Below the windows is a sill carved with a text. The south end of the each aisle contains a doorway. Above the left doorway is a niche containing a statue, and over the right doorway is an oculus. Along the sides of the aisles are square-headed two-light windows, and in the clerestory are windows with pointed heads containing Perpendicular tracery. The north window has five lights.

Inside the church are arcades carried on octagonal piers, a wooden reredos, a low stone wall between the nave and the chancel incorporating a wooden pulpit, and a stone font. The three-manual pipe organ was made by E. Wadsworth of Manchester.

== See also ==
- List of churches in Greater Manchester
- Listed buildings in Manchester-M40
- List of ecclesiastical works by Austin and Paley (1895–1914)
