= Parliamentary Under-Secretary of State for Devolution and Regional Growth =

British junior minister

United Kingdom Parliamentary Under-Secretary of State for Local Government, Devolution and Regional Growth
- Royal Arms of His Majesty's Government

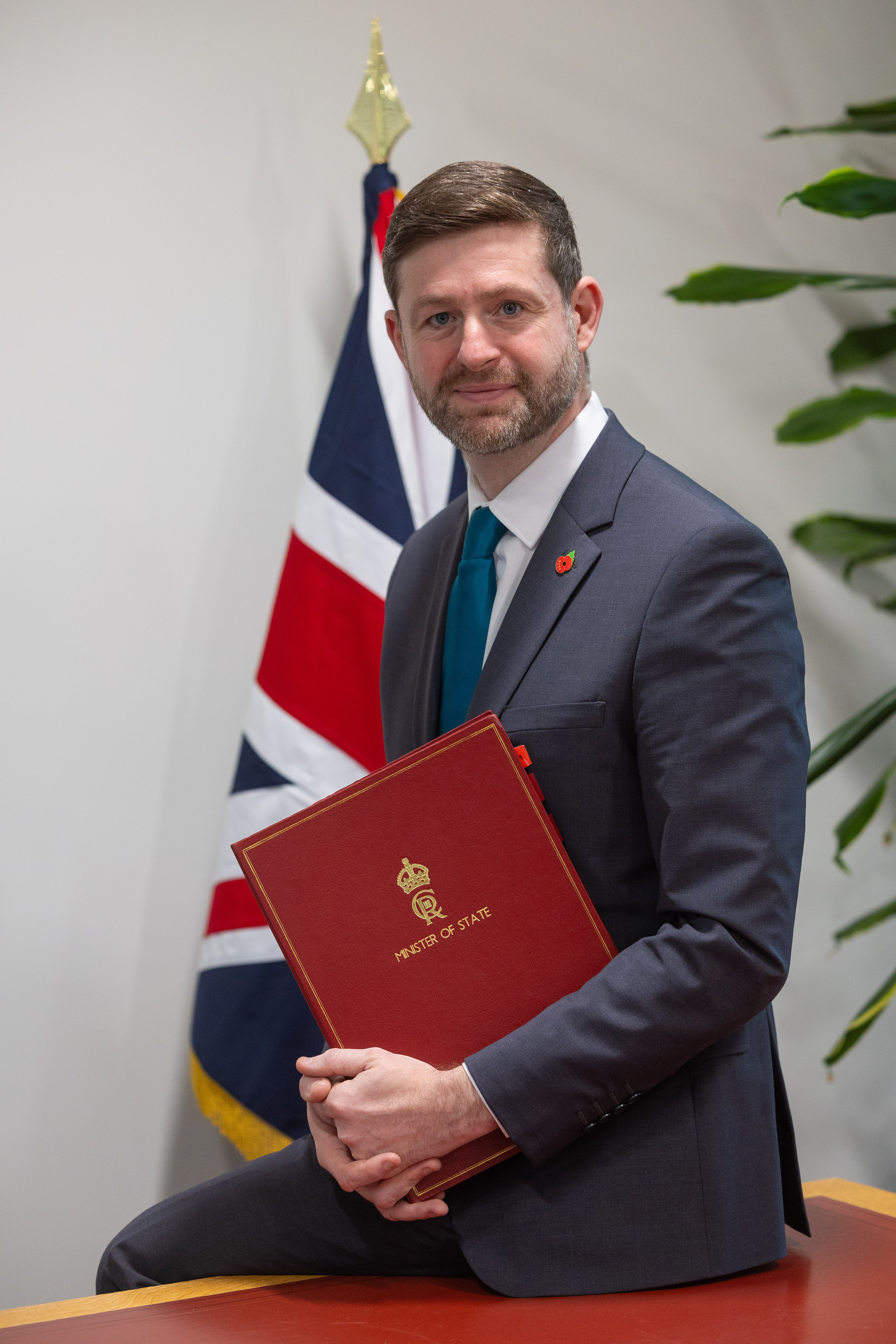
- Incumbent; Jim McMahon since 22 July 2026
- Ministry of Housing, Communities and Local Government
- Nominator: Prime Minister
- Appointer: The Monarch; on advice of the Prime Minister
- Term length: At His Majesty's pleasure

In the United Kingdom, a junior minister with responsibility for devolution in England was first appointed in July 2024.

== Background ==
The Labour Party manifesto for the 2017 general election included a commitment to establish the post of a "Minister for England" within the Department of Communities and Local Government.

A position of "Minister for England", with responsibility for representing English interests within intergovernmental bodies, was proposed by a report titled "Intergovernmental Relations in the UK: Time for a Radical Overhaul?" published in The Political Quarterly in 2020.

In a report titled Devolving English Government published in April 2023 the Institute for Government and the University of Cambridge's Bennett Institute for Public Policy proposed the creation of an "Office for England" led by a "Secretary of State for England".

A dedicated ministerial role with responsibility for English devolution was created in July 2024, following Labour's victory in the 2024 general election, when Jim McMahon was appointed Minister of State for Local Government and English Devolution.

Responsibility for English devolution strategy and local economic growth was transferred from the Ministry of Housing, Communities and Local Government (MCHLG) to the Cabinet Office's newly established Number 10 North in Manchester after Andy Burnham became prime minister on 20 July 2026.

== Responsibilities ==
The minister's responsibilities include:

- English devolution;
- Strategic authorities and pan-regional bodies;
- Local and regional growth and investment

== Ministers ==
Name	Portrait	Entered office	Left office	Political party	Prime Minister
Minister of State for Decentralisation
Greg Clark		13 May 2010	4 September 2012	Conservative	Cameron
Parliamentary Under-Secretary of State for Decentralisation
Nick Boles		5 September 2012	14 July 2014	Conservative	Cameron
Penny Mordaunt		14 July 2014	11 May 2015	Conservative	Cameron
Parliamentary Under-Secretary of State for Local Growth and Northern Powerhouse
James Wharton		11 May 2015	17 July 2016	Conservative	Cameron
Andrew Percy		17 July 2016	14 June 2017	Conservative	May
Jake Berry		14 June 2017	25 July 2019	Conservative	May
Minister of State for the Northern Powerhouse and Local Growth
Jake Berry		25 July 2019	13 February 2020	Conservative	Johnson
Minister of State for Regional Growth and Local Government
Simon Clarke		13 February 2020	8 September 2020	Conservative	Johnson
Luke Hall		8 September 2020	15 September 2021	Conservative	Johnson
Parliamentary Under Secretary of State for Levelling Up, The Union and Constitution
Neil O'Brien		17 September 2021	6 July 2022	Conservative	Johnson
Lia Nici		8 July 2022	20 September 2022	Conservative	Johnson
Parliamentary Under Secretary of State for Levelling Up
Dehenna Davison		8 September 2022	18 September 2023	Conservative	Truss; Sunak
Jacob Young		18 September 2023	5 July 2026	Conservative	Sunak
Minister of State for Local Government and English Devolution
Jim McMahon		6 July 2024	6 September 2025	Labour Co-op	Starmer
Parliamentary Under-Secretary of State for Devolution, Faith and Communities
Miatta Fahnbulleh		6 September 2025	12 May 2026	Labour Co-op	Starmer
Parliamentary Under-Secretary of State for Devolution, Local Growth and Communities
Nesil Caliskan		12 May 2026	22 July 2026	Labour	Starmer
Parliamentary Under-Secretary of State for Local Government, Devolution and Regional Growth
Jim McMahon		22 July 2026	Incumbent	Labour Co-op	Burnham

== See also ==
- Minister of state (United Kingdom)
- Parliamentary under-secretary of state
- Parliamentary Secretary for the Cabinet Office
- Minister of State for Homelessness, Democracy, Communities and Faith
- Parliamentary Under-Secretary of State for Local Government (UK)
