= Westwood, Greater Manchester =

Coordinates: 53.5462°N 2.1275°W

Westwood
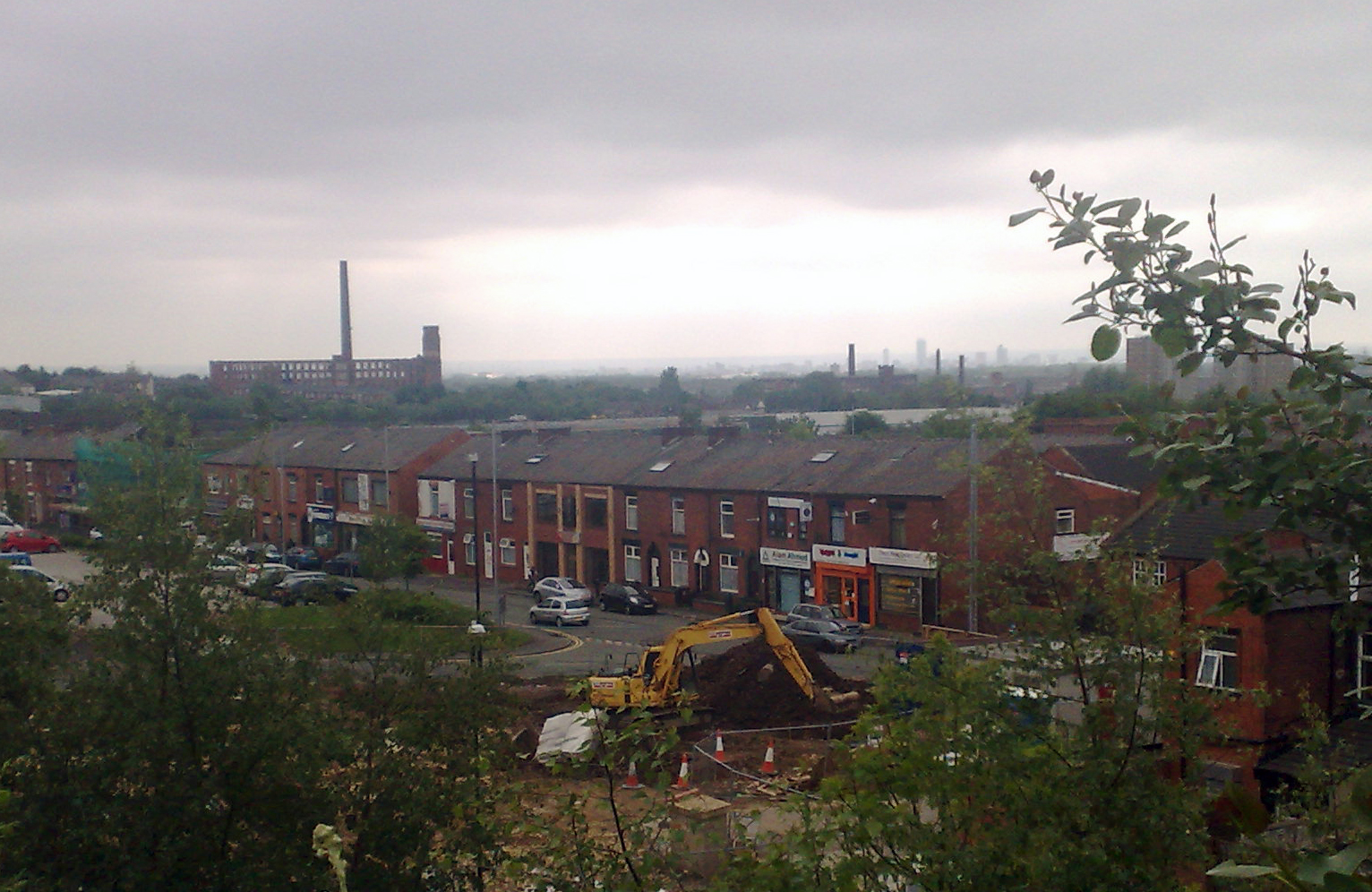
- Featherstall Road South, the main thoroughfare of Westwood

- Location within Greater Manchester
- OS grid reference: SD915055
- Metropolitan borough: Oldham
- Metropolitan county: Greater Manchester
- Region: North West
- Country: England
- Sovereign state: United Kingdom
- Post town: OLDHAM
- Postcode district: OL9
- Dialling code: 0161
- Police: Greater Manchester
- Fire: Greater Manchester
- Ambulance: North West
- UK Parliament: Oldham West and Royton

Westwood is an urban area of Oldham, in Greater Manchester, England. It occupies a hillside known as North Moor in the western part of Oldham, close to its boundary with Royton and Chadderton. Westwood, which has no formal boundary or extent, is bisected by the A6048 road .

Historically a part of Lancashire, Westwood was formerly an electoral ward of the County Borough of Oldham, but is now split between the wards of Coldhurst and Werneth, which lie to the north and south respectively. Apart from its industrial and commercial units, Westwood's built environment is "almost entirely" composed of Victorian era terraces, with some small pockets of housing association and council house properties.

The Metropolitan Borough of Oldham has the largest population of Bangladeshis in the United Kingdom outside of London. Sixty percent of the borough's Bangladeshi community live in Westwood. Most of them immigrated from the Sylhet Division of Bangladesh. Westwood features a replica of the Shaheed Minar national monument, which commemorates those killed in the Bengali language movement demonstrations in 1952.

In the 1980s, unemployment in Westwood experienced a "massive increase", significantly higher than the "modest increase" seen in Oldham as a whole. Ethnicity was attributed as a factor.

Westwood Moravian Church congregation was founded in 1865. A church building for the congregation dating from 1869 still stands in the locality. The congregation now worships in Royton.

Winston Churchill frequented Westwood's Conservative club. Churchill orated at the club during his period as Member of Parliament for Oldham.

Westwood Primary is a primary school located in the area.

Westwood Metrolink station opened in 2012 in Phase 3b of the Manchester Metrolink extension. It was funded by the Greater Manchester Transport Innovation Fund.

The Greater Manchester Waste Disposal Authority operate a transfer loading station at Westwood Industrial Estate. Anchor Retail Park occupies Anchor Mill, a former cotton mill.
