= Oldham West, Chadderton and Royton =

UK Parliament constituency (since 1997)

Coordinates: 53°36′N 2°06′W

- Borough constituency for the House of Commons
- Interactive map of boundaries since 2010
- Location within North West England
- County: Greater Manchester
- Electorate: 74,183 (March 2020)
- Major settlements: Oldham, Royton, Chadderton

Current constituency
- Created: 1997 (as Oldham West and Royton)
- Member of Parliament: Jim McMahon (Labour Co-op)
- Seats: One
- Created from: Oldham West and Oldham Central and Royton

Oldham West, Chadderton and Royton (known as Oldham West and Royton prior to 2024) is a constituency (Note: A borough constituency (for the purposes of election expenses and type of returning officer)) in the House of Commons of the UK Parliament. (Note: As with all constituencies, the constituency elects one Member of Parliament (MP) by the first-past-the-post system of election at least every five years.) It has been represented by the Jim McMahon of the Labour Party since 2015

== Name ==
In July 2006, fourteen representations were received by the Boundary Commission for England, which called for the inclusion of Chadderton in the name of the Oldham West and Royton parliamentary constituency. Many of these objectors pointed out that Chadderton was much larger and more populous than Royton. The commission rejected the proposed alternative name (Oldham West, Chadderton and Royton) because it was too long and they did not believe that there was a significant amount of support for a name change.

The commission later adopted the proposed renaming of the constituency to Oldham West, Chadderton and Royton as part of the 2023 review of Westminster constituencies, with unchanged boundaries.

== Constituency profile ==
Oldham West, Chadderton and Royton is a constituency in Greater Manchester in North West England. It covers the western half of Oldham (including most of the town centre and the neighbourhoods of Fitton Hill, Limeside, Werneth, Westwood and Coldhurst) and the nearby, connected towns of Chadderton and Royton.

Oldham is a large town that was traditionally reliant on the textile trade, especially cotton spinning. It grew rapidly as a mill town during the Victorian era, and in the early 20th century, the town hosted more than one-tenth of the world's operational spinning machines. Oldham also has a history of coal mining, however neither industry survived into the 21st century. Dense terraced housing, built to house factory workers, is typical of the town's central neighbourhoods.

Like much of industrial Northern England, the decline of the textile and coal industries in the late 20th century left the area highly-deprived; most of this part of Oldham falls within the top 10% most-deprived areas in England. Chadderton and Royton are similar in profile to Oldham; former factory towns with high rates of poverty. However, the outskirts of Chadderton and Royton contain wealthier, suburban residential districts with large detached and semi-detached properties. House prices across the constituency are generally lower than the rest of North West England and the average price is less than half the UK average.

View of Oldham from Tandle Hill Country Park in Royton, one of the more suburban parts of the constituency

Residents of the constituency are younger than average with a low proportion of retirees. They have low rates of income and homeownership and the child poverty rate is more than double the UK-wide figure. Residents have low levels of education and a high proportion work in the health and retail sectors. The percentage claiming unemployment benefits is nearly twice the national rate. White people made up 59% of the population at the 2021 census. Asians were the largest ethnic minority group at 33%, mostly of Bangladeshi and Pakistani origin. Asians made up around three-quarters of the population in Oldham's central neighbourhoods, whilst White people made up a majority in Chadderton and around 90% of residents in Royton.

At the local borough council, the densely-populated central area of Oldham and Chadderton is mostly represented by Labour Party councillors, whilst Royton and the outer suburban areas elected Reform UK, Conservative and Liberal Democrat representatives. Voters in the constituency strongly supported leaving the European Union in the 2016 referendum; an estimated 61% voted in favour of Brexit compared to the UK-wide figure of 52%.

== Boundaries ==
The constituency is one of three covering the Metropolitan Borough of Oldham. It covers most of the western part of the borough, including Chadderton and Royton but not Failsworth which was in the Ashton-under-Lyne constituency until 2024, and then Manchester Central thereafter.

1997–2010: The Metropolitan Borough of Oldham wards of Alexandra, Chadderton Central, Chadderton North, Chadderton South, Coldhurst, Royton North, Royton South, St Paul's, and Werneth.

2010–present: The Metropolitan Borough of Oldham wards of Chadderton Central, Chadderton North, Chadderton South, Coldhurst, Hollinwood, Medlock Vale, Royton North, Royton South, and Werneth.

The 2023 review of Westminster constituencies, which was based on the ward structure in place at 1 December 2020, left the boundaries unchanged. However, the name of the constituency was changed to include Chadderton.

== History ==
The present constituency was formed in 1997 from parts of the former Oldham Central and Royton and Oldham West constituencies and has to date been a safe seat for the Labour Party, having been held by Michael Meacher since the 1997 general election. Meacher had previously been the MP for the predecessor seat of Oldham West since 1970.

Despite no part of the constituency, nor Oldham Metropolitan Borough Council ever having had a BNP councillor, the constituency gained a level of notoriety at the 2001 general election when the leader of the far-right British National Party (BNP), Nick Griffin, stood as a candidate. Griffin received 6,552 votes (a 16.4% share), beating the Liberal Democrats to third place and 524 votes behind the Conservative Duncan Reed in second. This was widely interpreted to be a reaction to the serious race riots that had occurred in Oldham (and other northern towns) a few months earlier. Because of the heightened tension, the Returning officer took the decision not to allow any candidates to make speeches after the declaration of the results. This led to Griffin and fellow BNP candidate Michael Treacy, who ran in the neighbouring constituency of Oldham East and Saddleworth, symbolically gagging themselves on the platform wearing T-shirts bearing the slogan "Gagged for Telling the Truth".

In local elections following the 2001 race riots, the BNP also received considerable support: specifically in the two wards of Royton North and Royton South. However, from 2008 the BNP share of the vote has been markedly lower, with BNP and former BNP candidates coming in third or fourth in Royton North and other Oldham West and Royton Wards.

At the 2005 and 2010 general elections the BNP managed to retain their deposits (polling around 7% on both occasions) but have only achieved fourth place, with the Conservative Party second behind veteran politician Michael Meacher of the Labour Party, who stood at the 2015 general election. Meacher's death in October 2015 triggered a by-election, the first of the new Parliament, which was held on 3 December 2015 and was won by Jim McMahon of the Labour Party.

== Members of Parliament ==
Election	Member	Party
1997	Michael Meacher	Labour
2015 by-election	Jim McMahon	Labour Co-op

== Elections ==
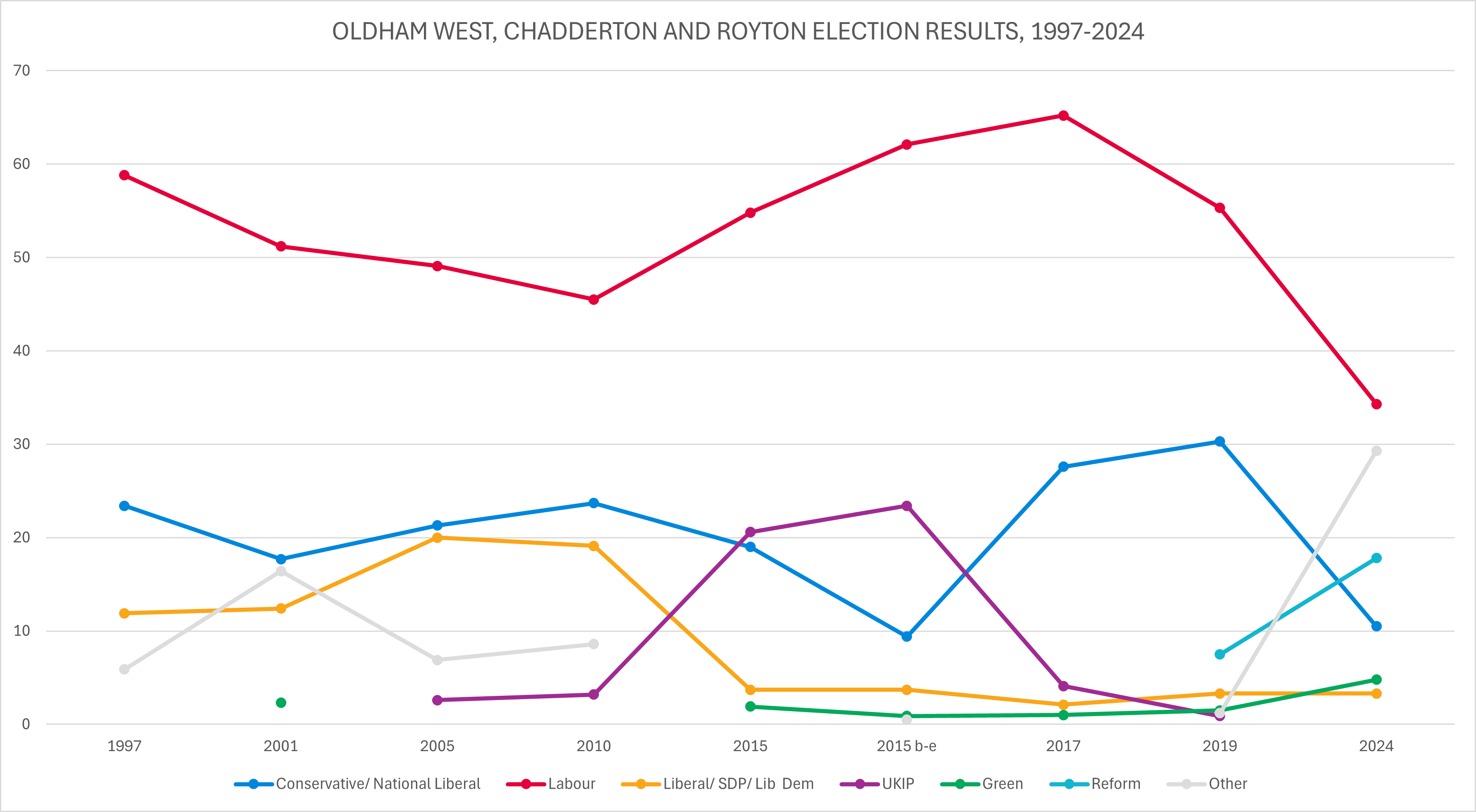
Election results 1997-2024

=== Elections in the 2020s ===
General election 2024: Oldham West, Chadderton and Royton
Party	Candidate	Votes	%	±%
Labour Co-op	Jim McMahon	13,232	34.3	−21.0
Independent	Zaffar Iqbal	8,256	21.4	N/A
Reform	David Silbiger	6,848	17.8	+10.3
Conservative	Horatio Lovering	4,066	10.5	−19.8
Independent	Raja Miah	2,470	6.4	N/A
Green	Samsuzzaman Syed	1,857	4.8	+3.3
Liberal Democrats	Hannah Kitching	1,271	3.3	±0.0
Independent	Tony Wilson	573	1.5	N/A
Majority		4,976	12.9	−12.1
Turnout		38,573	51.0	−8.7
Registered electors		75,346		
Labour Co-op hold		Swing	-21.2	

=== Elections in the 2010s ===
General election 2019: Oldham West and Royton
Party	Candidate	Votes	%	±%
Labour Co-op	Jim McMahon	24,579	55.3	−9.9
Conservative	Kirsty Finlayson	13,452	30.3	+2.7
Brexit Party	Helen Formby	3,316	7.5	N/A
Liberal Democrats	Garth Harkness	1,484	3.3	+1.2
Green	Dan Jerrome	681	1.5	+0.5
Proud of Oldham and Saddleworth	Debbie Cole	533	1.2	N/A
UKIP	Anthony Prince	389	0.9	−3.2
Majority		11,127	25.0	−12.6
Turnout		44,434	60.8	−2.4
Labour Co-op hold		Swing	-6.3	

General election 2017: Oldham West and Royton
Party	Candidate	Votes	%	±%
Labour Co-op	Jim McMahon	29,846	65.2	+10.4
Conservative	Christopher Glenny	12,648	27.6	+8.6
UKIP	Ruth Keating	1,899	4.1	−16.5
Liberal Democrats	Garth Harkness	956	2.1	−1.6
Green	Adam King	439	1.0	−0.9
Majority		17,198	37.6	+3.4
Turnout		45,788	63.2	+3.6
Labour Co-op hold		Swing	+0.9	

By-election, 2015: Oldham West and Royton
Party	Candidate	Votes	%	±%
Labour Co-op	Jim McMahon	17,209	62.1	+7.3
UKIP	John Bickley	6,487	23.4	+2.8
Conservative	James Daly	2,596	9.4	−9.6
Liberal Democrats	Jane Brophy	1,024	3.7	0.0
Green	Simeon Hart	249	0.9	−1.0
Monster Raving Loony	Sir Oink A-Lot	141	0.5	N/A
Majority		10,722	38.7	+4.5
Turnout		27,706	40.3	−19.3
Labour Co-op hold		Swing	+2.3	

General election 2015: Oldham West and Royton
Party	Candidate	Votes	%	±%
Labour	Michael Meacher	23,630	54.8	+9.3
UKIP	Francis Arbour	8,892	20.6	+17.4
Conservative	Kamran Ghafoor	8,187	19.0	−4.7
Liberal Democrats	Garth Harkness	1,589	3.7	−15.4
Green	Simeon Hart	839	1.9	N/A
Majority		14,738	34.2	+12.4
Turnout		43,137	59.6	+0.5
Labour hold		Swing	−4.0	

General election 2010: Oldham West and Royton
Party	Candidate	Votes	%	±%
Labour	Michael Meacher	19,503	45.5	−2.9
Conservative	Kamran Ghafoor	10,151	23.7	+2.6
Liberal Democrats	Mark Alcock	8,193	19.1	−2.1
BNP	Dave Jones	3,049	7.1	+0.3
UKIP	Helen Roberts	1,387	3.2	+0.7
Respect	Shahid Miah	627	1.5	N/A
Majority		9,352	21.8	−5.3
Turnout		42,910	59.1	+5.1
Labour hold		Swing	−2.7	

=== Elections in the 2000s ===
General election 2005: Oldham West and Royton
Party	Candidate	Votes	%	±%
Labour	Michael Meacher	18,452	49.1	−2.1
Conservative	Sean Moore	7,998	21.3	+3.6
Liberal Democrats	Stuart Bodsworth	7,519	20.0	+7.6
BNP	Anita Corbett	2,606	6.9	−9.5
UKIP	David Short	987	2.6	N/A
Majority		10,454	27.8	−5.7
Turnout		37,562	53.3	−4.3
Labour hold		Swing	−2.8	

General election 2001: Oldham West and Royton
Party	Candidate	Votes	%	±%
Labour	Michael Meacher	20,441	51.2	−7.6
Conservative	Duncan Reed	7,076	17.7	−5.7
BNP	Nick Griffin	6,552	16.4	N/A
Liberal Democrats	Marc Ramsbottom	4,975	12.4	+0.5
Green	David Roney	918	2.3	N/A
Majority		13,365	33.5	−1.9
Turnout		39,962	57.6	−8.5
Labour hold		Swing		

=== Elections in the 1990s ===
General election 1997: Oldham West and Royton
Party	Candidate	Votes	%	±%
Labour	Michael Meacher	26,894	58.8	+9.7
Conservative	Jonathan Lord	10,693	23.4	−14.7
Liberal Democrats	Howard Cohen	5,434	11.9	+0.4
Socialist Labour	Gias Choudhury	1,311	2.9	N/A
Referendum	Peter Etherden	1,157	2.5	N/A
Natural Law	Sheila Dalling	249	0.5	N/A
Majority		16,201	35.4	+24.4
Turnout		45,738	66.1	
Labour win (new seat)				

== See also ==
- Parliamentary constituencies in Greater Manchester
- 2015 Oldham West and Royton by-election
