= Victoria Mill =

Former cotton mill in Manchester, England

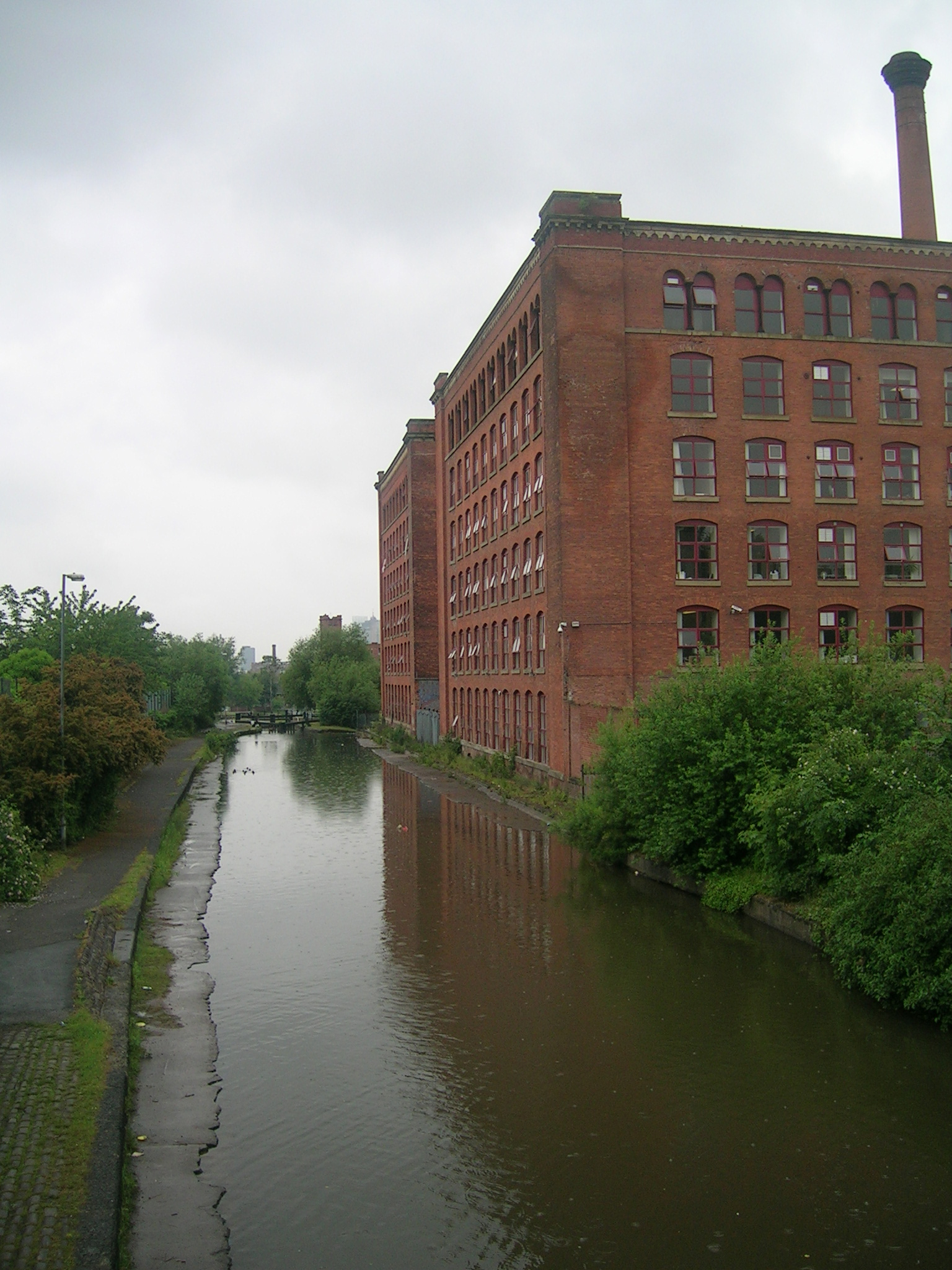
- Victoria Mill alongside the Rochdale Canal in 2007

Cotton
- Current status: Converted to residential and offices
- Architectural style: Italianate
- Location: Lower Vickers Street, Miles Platting, Manchester, England
- Client: William Holland & Sons
- Further ownership: Fine Cotton Spinners and Doublers Association (1898)
- Coordinates: SJ 859 993

Construction
- Built: 1869, 1873

Design team
- Architect: George Woodhouse

Equipment

Listed Building – Grade II*
- Official name: Victoria Mill
- Designated: 29 November 1988
- Reference no.: 1197924

Victoria Mill is a Grade II* listed former cotton-spinning mill on Lower Vickers Street in Miles Platting, an inner-city district of Manchester, England. Designed by George Woodhouse and built in two phases in the late 19th century for William Holland & Sons, it formed part of the city's expanding textile industry and stood close to the Rochdale Canal and Varley Street. The mill later became part of the Fine Cotton Spinners and Doublers Association and continued in production until 1960. After standing partly vacant for many years, it was converted in the early 2000s for mixed residential and commercial use, with key historic features retained.

== History ==
The building was constructed in two phases, in 1869 and 1873, according to its official listing. (Note: Other sources give construction dates of 1867 and 1873.) It was designed by George Woodhouse of Bolton for William Holland & Sons of the Adelphi Mill in Salford, and stands beside the Rochdale Canal.

Victoria Mill contributed to Manchester's development as a major centre of the cotton industry during the 19th century. It provided employment in the surrounding area and formed part of the wider industrial growth of the region.

In 1898 it was acquired by the Fine Cotton Spinners and Doublers Association and remained in operation until 1960.

On 29 November 1988, Victoria Mill was designated a Grade II* listed building.

After its closure, the mill stood partly vacant for several decades. In the early 2000s it was redeveloped by the Whitecroft Group for mixed residential and commercial use. The project retained key historical features, including the external brick elevations and internal cast-iron columns, while adapting the building for contemporary use. Interior fit-out works were carried out by Medlock FRB, involving refurbishment of internal spaces with the retention of original fabric where practicable. Building services were installed by Murray Building Services to meet modern standards for energy efficiency and safety.

== Architecture ==
The building is constructed of red brick with yellow brick detailing. Its roof cannot be seen from ground level but was likely covered in slate. The interior was built to be fire‑resistant. The plan forms a U‑shape, created by two large rectangular spinning blocks linked by a central section that originally housed the engines. The layout is symmetrical, arranged around a stair tower that encloses the chimney, with the engine and boiler houses set behind it. This central area sits within a narrow courtyard between the two mill ranges. The left side shows evidence of an earlier internal engine house, while the right side is partly hidden by a brick shaft added in 1920.

The two spinning blocks rise six storeys and have eleven bays by ten bays. They have strong vertical detailing at the corners, which continues upwards as small towers on the north side. Their design follows an Italianate style, with arched windows on most floors and paired round‑headed windows on the top level set within a decorative arcade. Each block also has a small two‑window tower near its centre that appears to have been added later.

Some smaller buildings remain to the northwest of the site, but the former blowing rooms, offices, and other ranges that once stood across the front yard and to the southeast have been demolished. For its period, it is an unusually large double mill, notable for the way it combines its stair tower and chimney into a single feature. A similarly distinctive way of combining the chimney with the main structure can be seen at Bliss Tweed Mill near Chipping Norton in Oxfordshire.

== See also ==
- Cottonopolis
- Grade II* listed buildings in Greater Manchester
- List of mills in Manchester
- Listed buildings in Manchester-M40
- Textile manufacture during the Industrial Revolution
