= Miles Platting =

Area in Manchester, England

Coordinates: 53.489167°N 2.215833°W

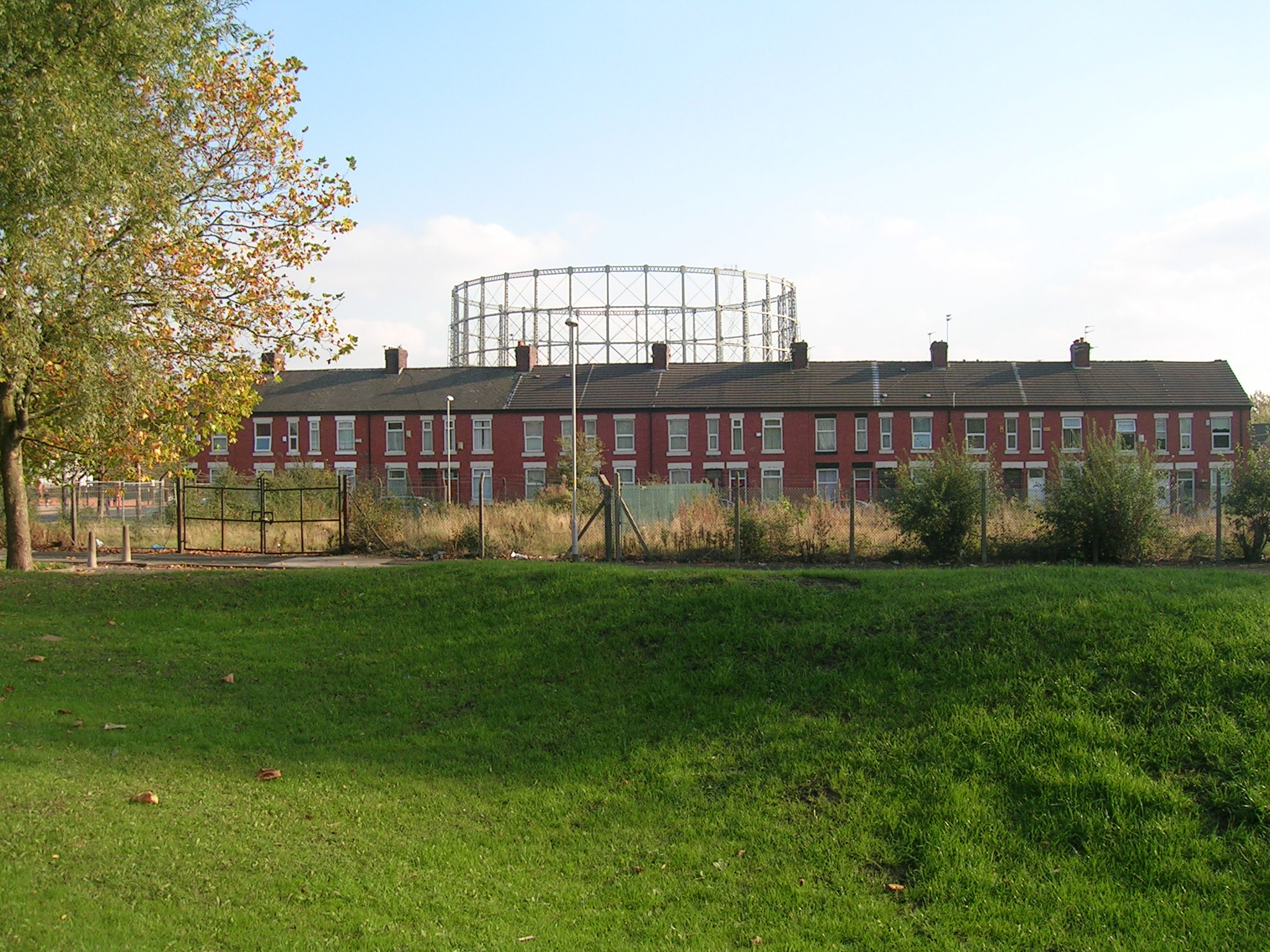
- A row of terraced houses in Miles Platting

- Location within Greater Manchester
- OS grid reference: SJ856992
  - London: 163 mi (262 km) SE
- Metropolitan borough: Manchester
- Metropolitan county: Greater Manchester
- Region: North West
- Country: England
- Sovereign state: United Kingdom
- Post town: MANCHESTER
- Postcode district: M40
- Dialling code: 0161
- Police: Greater Manchester
- Fire: Greater Manchester
- Ambulance: North West
- UK Parliament: Manchester Central

Miles Platting is an inner city part of Manchester, England, 1.4 miles (2.3 km) northeast of Manchester city centre along the Rochdale Canal and A62 road, bounded by Monsall to the north, Collyhurst to the west, Newton Heath to the east, and Bradford, Holt Town and Ancoats to the south.

Historically part of the township of Newton Heath, Lancashire, Miles Platting expanded into a factory district as a result of the Industrial Revolution. That industrial growth resulted in a population that became very large for the size of the district, resulting in densely packed terraced housing that had degenerated into slums by 1950. As a result of this, crime rose and the area became an economically deprived part of the city.

Miles Platting has undergone extensive redevelopment and regeneration, with former slum terraces removed to make way for council housing.

== History ==
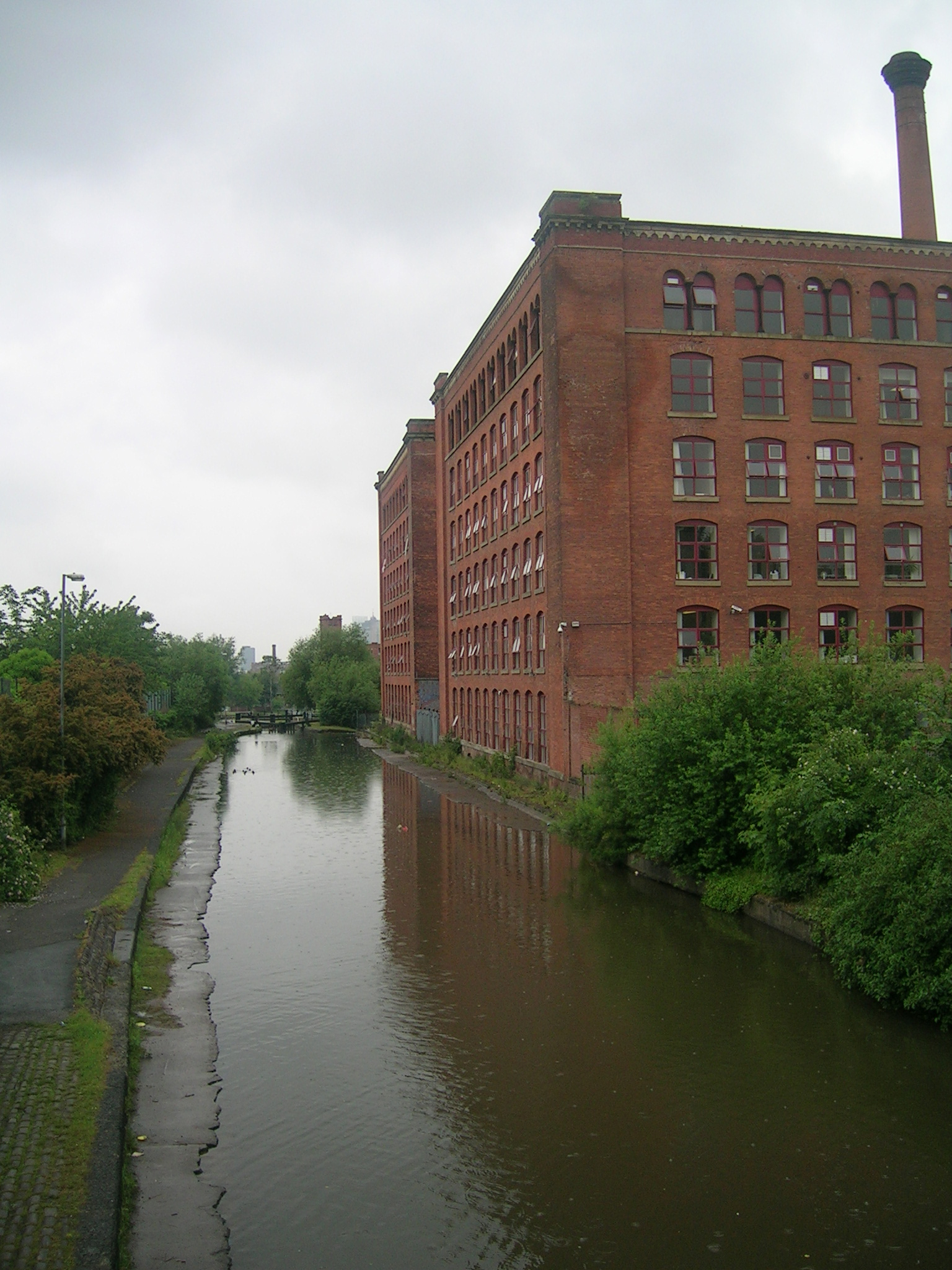
The Rochdale Canal is routed through Miles Platting.

Miles Platting first appeared on a map in 1790 at the point where Oldham Road crossed Newton Brook and a track led to Collyhurst Hall. The track became Collyhurst Street and the track on the opposite side of Oldham Road became Varley Street.

The name is derived from platting, a local word, meaning a small bridge across a stream. The Court leet records of the manor of Manchester dated 13 October 1742 record "Mr Henry Booth for suffering his Platting leading from Tib Lane into the Long Pitfield to lye broken in such manner that severall persons have fall'n and been ill brused". The footnote says "Platting, a local word, meaning a small bridge across a stream". This platting was a mile from Manchester (measured from New Cross at the bottom of Oldham Road). Hence Miles Platting.

Miles Platting had many mills towards the end of 19th century: Holland Mill, Victoria Mill and Ducie Mill were among the largest. By the 1870s a chemical works, timber yard, gas works and a tannery were also operating in the area alongside the many mills. This volume of industry in such a relatively small area inevitably led to the construction of densely packed back-to-back housing to provide homes for the necessary workforce. By the middle of the 20th century, with the decline in manufacturing industry and the closure of its local industries, Miles Platting had become a slum area inhabited by a deprived community. Today, Miles Platting contains just under 2,000 housing units, many of them managed by Adactus Housing Association on behalf of Manchester City Council, including 12 multi-storey blocks. The area, once recognised as being amongst the most deprived in the UK, has benefited from the substantial urban regeneration scheme for east Manchester initiated in the late 1990s.

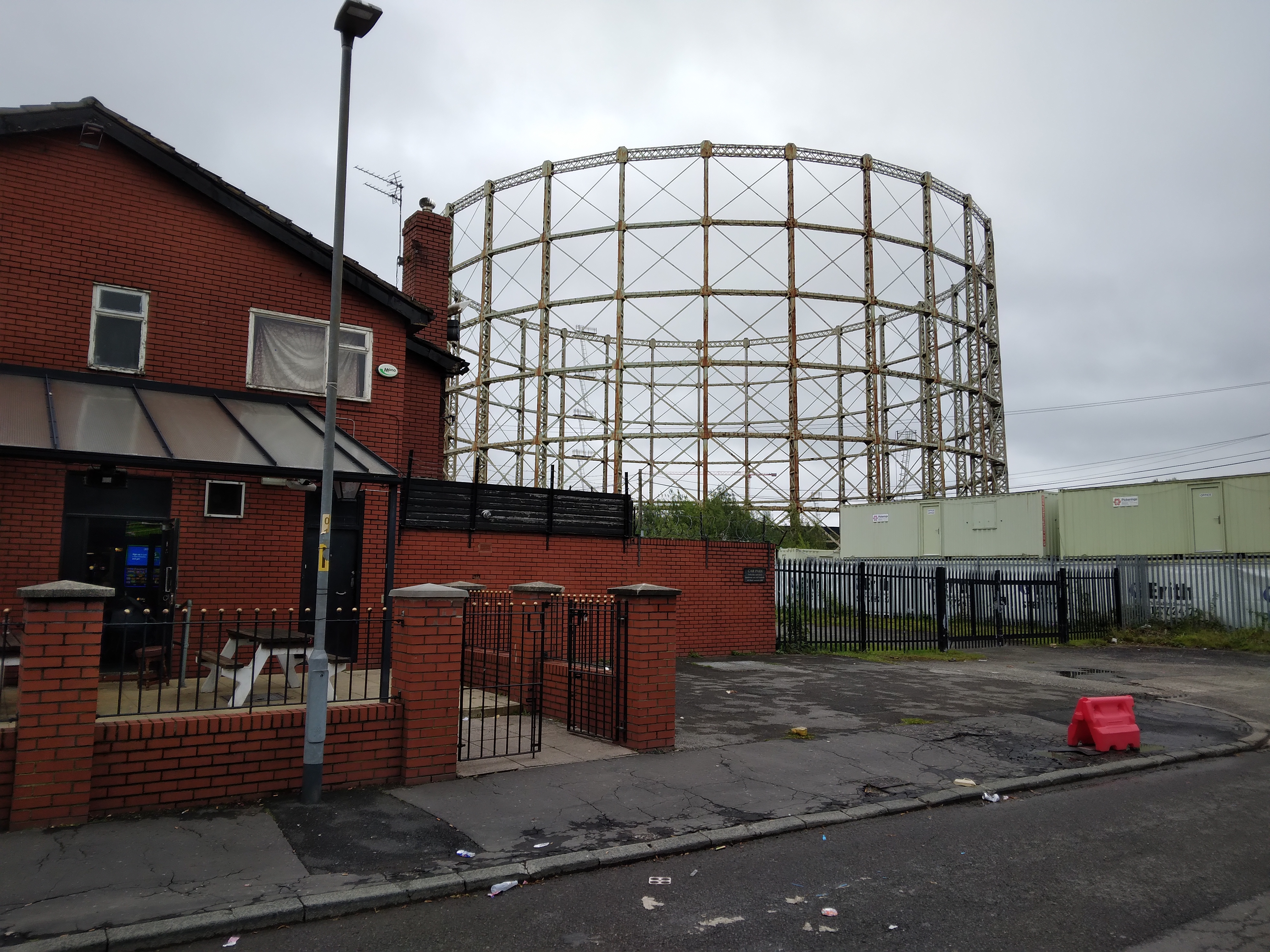
The Bradford Road (Saxon Street) gas holder which was demolished in late 2023

Miles Platting railway station lay at the junction of the lines from Manchester Victoria to Oldham and Stalybridge, but this closed in 1995, and the station was subsequently demolished. The railway line, which remains open for passenger traffic, separates Miles Platting from Collyhurst and Monsall.

Between 1839 and 1844, the area was also the location of Oldham Road railway station, the original terminus for the Manchester and Leeds Railway until the line was extended to Manchester Victoria station in the latter year. The station was then converted to become a major railway goods depot by the Lancashire and Yorkshire Railway, remaining in use until the 1960s.

== Governance ==
Miles Platting was incorporated into the City of Manchester in 1838.

== Landmarks ==
A prominent building of Miles Platting is Victoria Mill, a huge former cotton mill that looms over the district and now houses offices and apartments. Its restoration was directed by Fr Dominic Kirkham of Corpus Christi.

== Religion ==
Historically, much of the population of Miles Platting was of Irish Catholic or Italian descent, as evidenced by the large Corpus Christi Priory on Varley Street. The basilica has been served since 1889 by the Norbertine (Premonstratensian) Order, becoming an independent canonry of the order in 2004. Due to falling numbers and mounting repair and maintenance costs the basilica is now closed; the final Mass was celebrated by the Bishop of Salford on 27 April 2007. The basilica has been converted into the Usmania Banqueting Hall.

From 1880 until the slum clearances of the 1970s there was a Salvation Army corps in Cash Street.

Miles Platting is in the Roman Catholic Diocese of Salford, and the Anglican Diocese of Manchester.

Miles Platting does also have a very small Muslim minority.

== Transport ==
The majority of bus routes are operated by Stagecoach Manchester. Buses from the city centre include 74, 76, 76A. Little Gem and Stagecoach also offers the 217 service from Piccadilly Gardens to Ashton via Clayton.
