= History of Oldham =

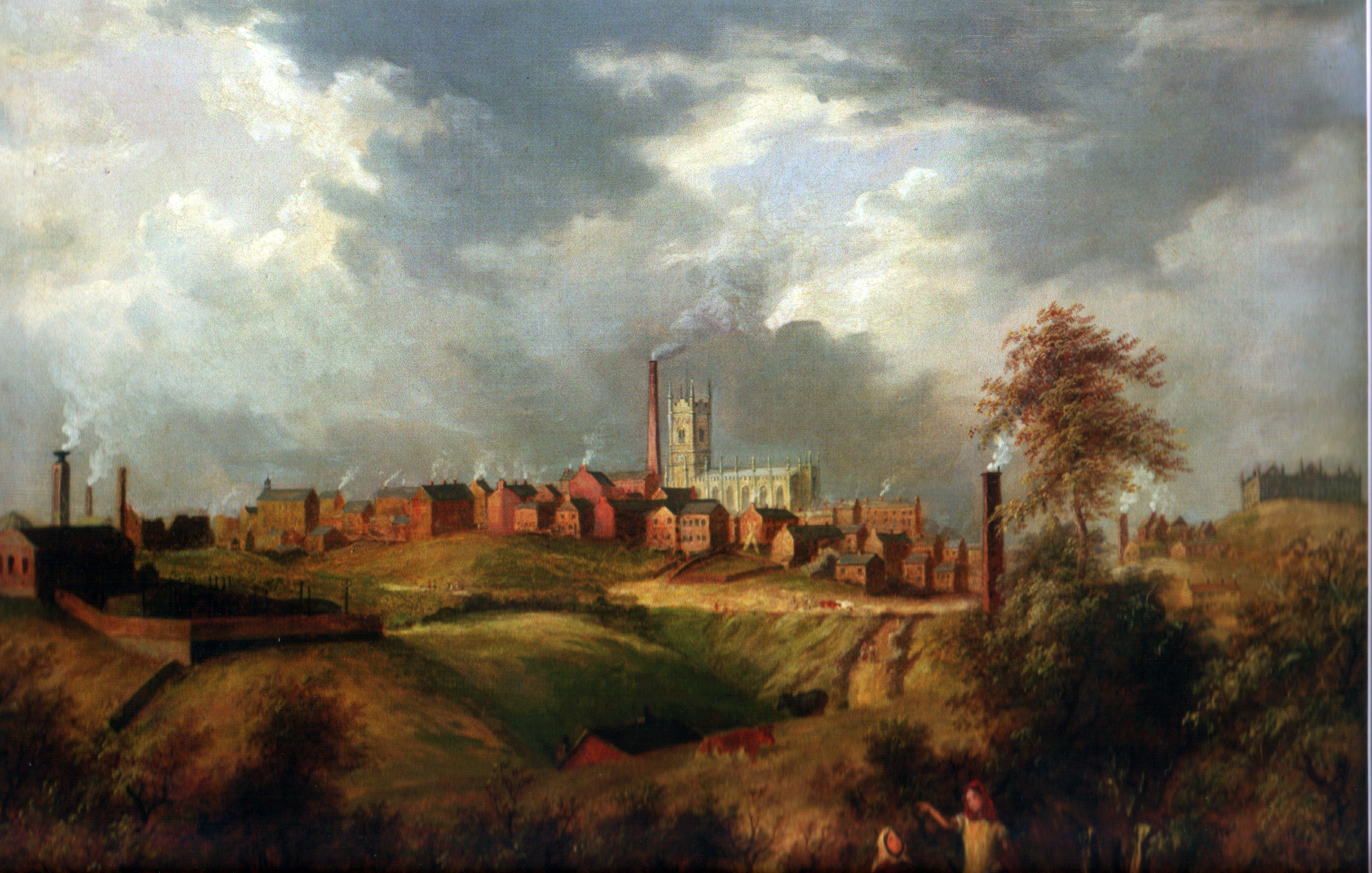
Oldham from Glodwick by James Howe Carse (1831), depicts the early skyline and industrial activities of Oldham. All the green space has since been urbanised.

The history of Oldham /ˈoʊldəm/ is one of dramatic change, from obscure Pennine hamlet to preeminent mill town and textile processing capital of the world. Oldham's industrial history includes hatting, coal mining, structural engineering, mechanical engineering, textile machinery manufacture and cotton spinning - for which the town is most noted.

Oldham has been described as the "most prodigious" mill town in Lancashire, and the "one that grew the quickest, from most insignificant beginnings, [... into...] the cotton spinning capital of the world."

Since the mid-20th century, Oldham has seen the demise of its textile industry, and the troubled integration of new cultural traditions and religions. With respect to the ensuing depression that followed Oldham's slump in textile manufacture, one author remarked that "when the fall finally came, it was the town that crashed the hardest."

== Early history ==
The earliest known evidence of a human presence in what is now Oldham is attested by the discovery of Neolithic flint arrow-heads and workings found at Werneth and Beesom Hill, implying habitation 7–10,000 years ago. Evidence of later Roman and Celtic activity is confirmed by an ancient Roman road and Bronze Age archaeological relics found at various sites within the town. Though Anglo-Saxons occupied territory around the area centuries earlier, Oldham as a permanent, named place of dwelling, is believed to date from 865, when Danish invaders established a settlement called Aldehulme.

Unmentioned in the Domesday Book, Oldham during the Middle Ages (from the time of its founding in the 9th century through to the Industrial Revolution) is believed to have been nothing but a mere scattering of small and insignificant settlements spread across the moorland and dirt tracks which linked Manchester to York. However Oldham does appear in legal documents from this time, invariably recorded as territory under minor ruling families and barons. In the 13th century, Oldham was documented as a manor held from The Crown by a family surnamed Oldham, whose seat was at Werneth Hall. It was this family which may have produced one of the greatest benefactors to education for the nation; Hugh Oldham. Richard de Oldham was recorded as lord of the manor of Werneth/Oldham (1354). His daughter and heiress, Margery (d.1384), married John de Cudworth (d.1384), from whom descended the Cudworth family of Werneth Hall who were successive lords of the manor of Werneth/Oldham. A Member of this family was James I's Chaplain Ralph Cudworth (father of the Cambridge Platonist philosopher Ralph Cudworth). The Cudworths remained lords of the manor until their sale of the estate (1683) to Sir Ralph Assheton of Middleton.

== Industrial Revolution and cotton ==
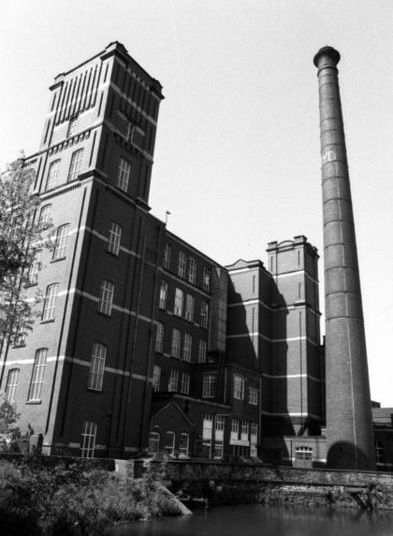
Royd mill, built in 1907, and seen here in 1983, was just one of Oldham's peak of 360 textile mills which operated night and day.

Much of Oldham's history is concerned with textile manufacture during the Industrial Revolution; it has been said that "if ever the Industrial Revolution placed a town firmly and squarely on the map of the world, that town is Oldham." Oldham's soils were too thin and poor to sustain crop growing, and so for decades prior to industrialisation the area was used for grazing sheep, which provided the raw material for a local woollen weaving trade. In the 17th century there were in Oldham various thriving crafts and trades chiefly devoted to cloth-making and linen-making on a domestic basis. It was not until the last quarter of the 18th century that Oldham changed from being a cottage industry township producing garments via domestic manual labour, to a sprawling industrial metropolis of textile factories.

The climate, geology, and topography of Oldham were unrelenting constraints upon the social and economic activities of the human inhabitants. Located 700 feet (213 m) above sea level with no major river or visible natural resources, Oldham had poor geographic attributes compared with other settlements for investors and their engineers. As a result, Oldham played no part in the initial period of the Industrial Revolution, although it did later become seen as obvious territory to industrialise because of its convenient position between the labour forces of Manchester and southwest Yorkshire. Cotton spinning and milling were introduced to Oldham when its first mill, Lees Hall, was built by William Clegg in about 1778, the beginning of a spiralling process of urbanisation and socioeconomic transformation. Within a year, 11 other mills had been constructed, and by 1818 there were 19 – not a large number in comparison with other local settlements. The first steam engine for Oldham went into operation in 1794. Oldham's small local population was greatly increased by the mass migration of workers from its outlying villages, resulting in a population increase from just over 12,000 in 1801 to 137,000 in 1901. The speed of this urban growth meant that Oldham, with little pre-industrial history to speak of, was effectively born as a factory town.

Oldham became the world's manufacturing centre for cotton spinning in the second half of the 19th century. In 1851, over 30% of Oldham's population was employed within the textile sector, compared to 5% across Great Britain. It overtook the major urban centres of Manchester and Bolton as the result of a mill building boom in the 1860s and 1870s, a period during which Oldham became the most productive cotton-spinning town in the world. By 1911 there were 16.4 million spindles in Oldham, compared with a total of 58 million in the United Kingdom and 143.5 million in the world; in 1928, with the construction of Elk mill – the UK's largest textile factory – Oldham reached its manufacturing zenith. At its peak, there were over 360 mills, operating night and day.

Oldham was hit hard by the Lancashire Cotton Famine of 1861–1865, when supplies of raw cotton from the United States were cut off. Wholly reliant upon the textile industry, the cotton famine created chronic unemployment in the town. By 1863 a committee had been formed, and with aid from central government, land was purchased with the intention of employing local cotton workers to construct Alexandra Park, which opened on 28 August 1865. Said to have over-relied upon the textile sector, as the importation of cheaper foreign yarns grew during the 20th century, Oldham's economy declined into a depression, although it was not until 1964 that Oldham ceased to be the largest centre of cotton spinning. In spite of efforts to increase the efficiency and competitiveness of its production, the last cotton spun in the town was at Elk mill, in 1998.

== Engineering ==
Facilitated by its flourishing textile industry, Oldham developed extensive structural and mechanical engineering sectors during the 18th and 19th centuries. The manufacture of spinning and weaving machinery in Oldham belongs to the last decade of the 19th century, when it became a leading centre in the field of engineering. The Platt Brothers, originated in nearby Dobcross village, but moved to Oldham. They were pioneers of cotton-spinning machinery, developing innovatory products which enabled the mass-production of cotton yarn. Platt Brothers became the largest textile machine makers in the world, employing over 15,000 people in the 1890s, twice the number of their nearest rivals Dobson & Barlow in Bolton and Asa Lees on Greenacres Moor. They were keen investors in the local area and at one time, were supporting 42% of the population. The centre of the company lay at the New Hartford Works in Werneth, a massive complex of buildings and internal railways on a site overlooking Manchester. The railway station which served this site later formed the basis of Oldham Werneth railway station. The main building exists to this day. Platts gained prestigious awards from around the world, and were heavily involved with local politics and civic pride in Oldham. John and James Platt were the largest subscribers for promoting Oldham from a township to a Borough; pledging £100 (more than double of the next largest sum) in advance towards any expenses which may have been incurred by the Royal Charter. In 1854 John Platt was made the (fourth) Mayor of Oldham, an office he was to hold twice more in 1855–56 and 1861–62. John Platt was elected in 1865 to become MP for Oldham, and was re-elected in 1868; he remained in office until his death in 1872. A bronze statue of Platt existed in the town centre for years, though was moved to Alexandra Park. There have been recommendations for it to be returned to the town centre.

Abraham Henthorn Stott, the son of a stonemason, was born in nearby Shaw and Crompton in 1822. He served a seven-year apprenticeship with Sir Charles Barry, before starting a structural engineering practice in Oldham in 1847 that went on to become the pre-eminent mill architect firm in Lancashire. Philip Sydney Stott, third son of Abraham and later titled as Sir Philip Stott, 1st Baronet, was the most prominent and famous of the Stott mill architects. He established his own practice in 1883 and designed over a hundred mills in several countries. His factories, which improved upon his father's fireproof mills, accounted for a 40% increase in the spindles of Oldham between 1887 and 1914.

Although textile-related engineering declined with the processing industry, leading to the demise of both Stotts and Platts, other engineering firms existed, notably electrical and later electronic engineers Ferranti in 1896. Ferranti went into receivership in 1993, but some of its former works continue in other hands, notably the original Hollinwood site now operated by Siemens.

Other notable engineering firms of Oldham included Dronsfield Bros Ltd., William Bodden & Sons Ltd., S. Dodd & Sons Ltd., George Orme Ltd., and Joseph Nadin Ltd.

== Coal mining ==
On the back of the Industrial Revolution, Oldham developed an extensive coal mining sector, created by Darby III correlated to supporting the local cotton industry and the town's inhabitants, though there is evidence of small scale coal mining in the area as early as the 16th century. The Oldham Coalfield stretched from Royton in the north to Bardsley in the south and in addition to Oldham, included the towns of Middleton and Chadderton to the west. The Oldham Coalfield was the site to over 150 collieries during its recorded history.

Though some contemporary sources suggest there was coal mining in Oldham at a commercial scale by 1738, older sources attribute the commercial expansion of coal mining with the arrival in the town of two Welsh labourers, John Evans and William Jones, around 1770. Foreseeing the growth in demand for coal as a source of motive and steam power, they acquired colliery rights for Oldham, which by 1771 had 14 colliers. The mines were largely to the southwest of the town around Hollinwood and Werneth and provided enough coal to accelerate Oldham's rapid development at the centre of the cotton boom. At its height in the mid-19th century, when it was dominated by the Lees and Jones families, Oldham coal was mainly sourced from many small collieries whose lives varied from a few years to many decades, though two of the four largest collieries survived to nationalisation. In 1851, collieries employed over 2,000 men in Oldham, though the amount of coal in the town was somewhat overestimated however, and production began to decline even before that of the local spinning industry. Today, the only visible remnants of the mines are disused shafts and boreholes.

== Social history ==
Oldham's social history, like that of other former unenfranchised towns, is marked by politicised civil disturbances, as well as events related to the Luddite, Suffragette and other Labour movements from the working classes. There has been a significant presence of "friendly societies".

It has been put that the people of Oldham became radical in politics in the early part the 19th century, and movements suspected of sedition found patronage in the town. Oldham was frequently disturbed by bread and labour riots, facilitated by periods of scarcity and the disturbance of employment following the introduction of cotton-spinning machinery. On 20 April 1812, a "large crowd of riotous individuals" compelled local retailers to sell foods at a loss, whilst on the same day Luddites numbering in their thousands, many of whom were from Oldham, attacked a cotton mill in nearby Middleton. John Lees, a cotton operative, was one of the victims of the Peterloo Massacre of 1819, and the 'Oldham inquest' which followed was anxiously watched; the Court of King's Bench, however, decided that the proceedings were irregular, and the jury were discharged without giving a verdict. Annie Kenney, born in nearby Springhead, and who worked in Oldham's cotton mills, was a notable of the Suffragette movement credited with sparking off suffragette militancy when she heckled Winston Churchill, and later (with Emmeline Pankhurst) the first Suffragist to be imprisoned. Oldham Women's Suffrage Society was established in 1910 with Margery Lees as president and quickly joined the Manchester and District Federation of the National Union of Women's Suffrage Societies. The Chartist and Co-operative movements had strong support in the town, whilst many Oldhamers protested against the emancipation of slaves. The Riot Act was read in 1852 on election day following a mass public brawl over the Reform Act, and irregularities with parliamentary candidate nominations.

For three days in late May 2001, Oldham became the centre of national and international media attention. Following high-profile race-related conflicts, and long-term underlying racial tensions between local white and South Asian communities, major race riots broke out in the town. Occurring with particular intensity in the Glodwick area of the town, the Oldham Riots were the worst racially motivated riots in the United Kingdom for fifteen years prior, briefly eclipsing the sectarian violence in Northern Ireland in the media. At least 20 people were injured in the riots, including 15 police officers, and 37 people were arrested. Similar riots took place in other towns in northern England over the following days and weeks. The 2001 riots prompted governmental and independent inquiries, which collectively agreed on community relations improvements and considerable regeneration schemes for the town.

== Municipal history ==
Lying within the historic county boundaries of Lancashire since the early 12th century, Oldham was recorded in 1212 as being part of the thegnage estate of Kaskenmoor, which was held on behalf of King John by Roger de Montbegon and William de Nevill. Oldham later formed a township within the ancient ecclesiastical parish of Prestwich-cum-Oldham, in the hundred of Salford.

In 1826 commissioners for the social and economic improvement of Oldham were established. The town was made a parliamentary borough, in 1832, though it was in 1849 when Oldham was incorporated as a municipal borough, giving it Borough status in the United Kingdom, and in 1850 the Borough Council obtained the powers of the improvement commissioners. In 1880 the Hollinwood and Crossbank parts of Chadderton and Ashton-under-Lyne townships were added to the Borough of Oldham. Oldham Above Town and Oldham Below Town were, from 1851 until c.1881, statistical units used for the gathering and organising of civil registration information, and output of census data.

When the administrative county of Lancashire was created by the Local Government Act 1888, Oldham was elevated to become the County Borough of Oldham and was outside the jurisdiction of the Lancashire County Council or, in modern terms, a unitary authority area. In 1951 parts of Alt, Bardsley and Woodhouses civil parishes were added to the County Borough of Oldham, and in 1954 other parts of these same civil parishes were added to it. Since 1961, Oldham has been twinned with Kranj in Slovenia. Under the Local Government Act 1972, the town's autonomous County borough status was abolished, and Oldham has, since 1 April 1974, formed part of the Metropolitan Borough of Oldham, within the Metropolitan county of Greater Manchester.

== Demographic history ==
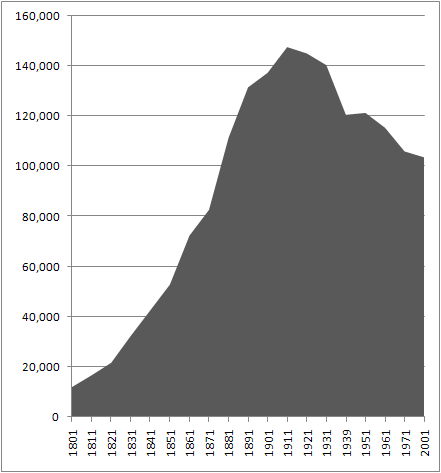
Oldham's population grew rapidly during the 19th century, though declined in the 20th.

With only a small local population during medieval times, as a result of the introduction of industry, mass migration of village workers into Oldham occurred, resulting in a population change from under 2,000 in 1714 to 12,000 in 1801 to 137,000 in 1901. Surnames of families forming the bulk of the parish of Oldham's earliest records include Assheton, Bardsley, Brearley, Broadbent, Butterworth, Buckley, Chadderton, Clegg, Coup, Crompton, Dunkerley, Halkyard, Halle, Heap, Heywood, Hopwood, Jackson, Knott, Lees, Mellor, Neild, Ogden, Schofield, Scholes, Smethurst, Sandiforth, Tetlow, Taylor, Whitehead, Whittaker, Winterbottom, Wolfenden, and Wild. The population change of the town since 1801, demonstrates a trend of rapid population growth in the 19th century and, after peaking at 147,483 people in 1911, a trend of general decline in population size during the 20th century.

Compared against the average demographics of the United Kingdom, Oldham has a high level of people of South Asian heritage, particularly those with roots in Pakistan and Bangladesh. Due to the town's prevalence as an industrial centre and thus a hub for employment, Oldham attracted migrant workers throughout its history, including those from wider-England, Scotland, Ireland and parts of Poland. During the 1950s and 1960s, in an attempt to fill the shortfall of workers and revitalise local industries, members of the wider Commonwealth of Nations were encouraged to migrate to Oldham and other British towns. Many came from the Caribbean and Indian subcontinent and settled throughout the Oldham borough. Today, Oldham has large communities with heritage from Bangladesh, India, Pakistan and parts of the Caribbean. At the time of the 2001 census, over one in four of its residents identified themselves as from a South Asian or British Asian ethnic group. Cultural divisions along ethnic backgrounds are strong within the town, with poor cross-community integration and cohesion along Asian and white backgrounds.

== Political history ==
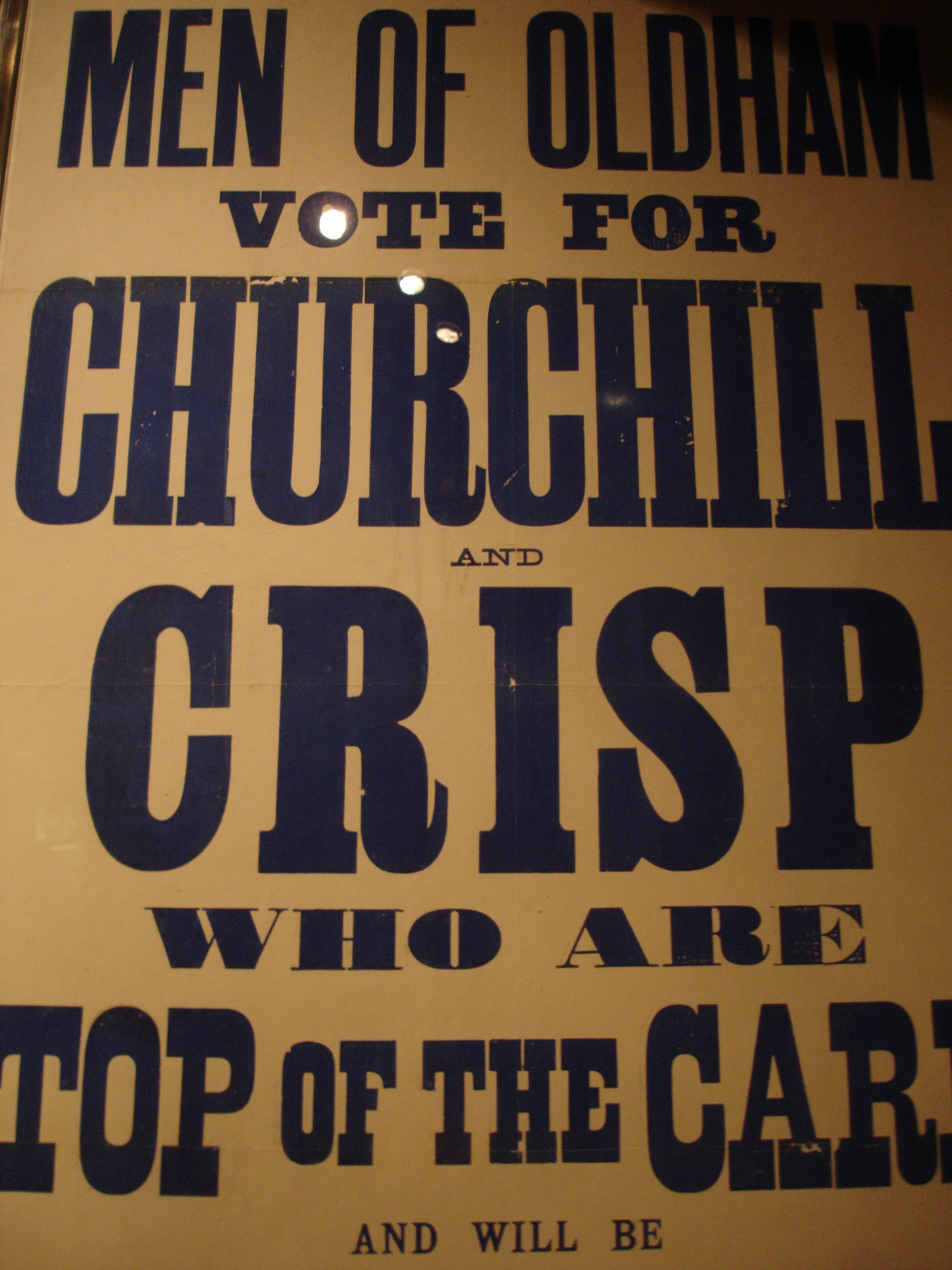
Churchill's election poster for Oldham.

Industrial workers in Oldham played a prominent role in the struggle for the vote. After hearing Major John Cartwright explain his views on parliamentary reform in 1816, Joseph Healey (an apothecary from Harpurhey) formed a Hampden Club in the town. After the passing of the Reform Act 1832, people of the newly created Oldham parliamentary borough elected the two Radical candidates, William Cobbett and John Fielden. Winston Churchill began his political career in Oldham. Although unsuccessful at his first attempt in 1899, Churchill was elected as the member of Parliament for the Oldham parliamentary borough constituency in the 1900 general election. He held the constituency for the Conservative Party until the 1906 general election, when he won the election for Manchester North West as a Liberal MP. After he became the prime minister of the United Kingdom in 1940, Churchill was made an Honorary Freeman of the Borough of Oldham, on 2 April 1941.

Since 1997, the boundaries of two parliamentary constituencies have divided Oldham; Oldham East and Saddleworth, and Oldham West and Royton (which includes the town centre), represented by Labour Members of Parliament Phil Woolas and Michael Meacher respectively.

Following the Oldham Riots in 2001, Oldham West and Royton gained notoriety at the 2001 general election when the leader of the far-right British National Party (BNP), Nick Griffin, stood as a candidate (despite it being a safe seat for Labour). Griffin received over 6,500 votes (a 16.4% share), beating the Liberal Democrats to third place, and finishing narrowly behind the Conservatives in second. This was widely interpreted to be a reaction to the race riots that had occurred in Oldham, Burnley and Bradford a few months earlier. Because of the heightened tension, the Returning Officer took the decision not to allow any candidates to make speeches after the declaration of the results. This led to Griffin and fellow BNP candidate Michael Treacy, who ran in the neighbouring constituency of Oldham East and Saddleworth, symbolically gagging themselves on the platform wearing T-shirts bearing the slogan "Gagged for Telling the Truth". At the 2005 election, the BNP's share of the vote declined, and Labour's Michael Meacher won comfortably.

== Commentary ==
The following commentary has been made about Oldham:

This country seems to have been designed by Providence for the very purposes to which it is now allotted—for carrying on a manufacture— which can nowhere be so easily supplied with the conveniences necessary for it. Nor is the industry of the people wanting to second these advantages. Though we met few people without doors, yet within we saw the houses full of lusty fellows, some at the dye vat, some at the loom, others dressing the cloths; the women and children carding or spinning; all employed, from the youngest to the oldest, scarce anything above four years old but its hands were sufficient for its own support.

— Daniel Defoe, A tour thro' the Whole Island of Great Britain, 1724–27

The visitor to Oldham will find it essentially a mean-looking straggling town, built upon both sides and crowning the ridge of one of the outlying spurs which branch from Manchester, the neighbouring "backbone of England". The whole place has a shabby underdone look. The general appearance of the operatives' houses is filthy and smouldering.

— Angus Reach, Morning Chronicle, 1849

The town consists of numerous streets, and contains numerous fine buildings, both public and private; but, in a general view, is irregularly constructed, presents the dingy aspect of a crowded seat of manufacture, and is more notable for factories than for any other feature.

— John Marius Wilson, Imperial Gazetteer of England and Wales, (1870–1872)

If ever the Industrial Revolution placed a town firmly and squarely on the map of the world, that town is Oldham.

— N. J. Frangopulo, Tradition in Action; The Historical Evolution of the Greater Manchester County, (1977)

Hardworking sort of town, perhaps not a flamboyant as others.

— Hemisphere Design and Marketing Consultants, Rebranding Oldham, (2008)

== See also ==
- History of Manchester
- History of Lancashire
- History of England
- Textile manufacture during the Industrial Revolution
- List of people from Oldham
- Bagley & Wright
