= Limehurst Rural District =

Former local government area in the UK

Coordinates: 53°28′N 2°10′W

Limehurst
- Area
  - 1911: 4,775 acres (19.32 km^{2})
  - 1951: 3,085 acres (12.48 km^{2})
- Population
  - 1901: 10,341
  - 1951: 8,447
- History
  - Origin: Rural sanitary district
  - Created: 1894
  - Abolished: 1954
  - Succeeded by: County Borough of Oldham; Municipal Borough of Ashton-under-Lyne; Droylsden Urban District; Failsworth Urban District; Municipal Borough of Mossley; Lees Urban District
- Status: Rural district
- Government: Limehurst Rural District Council
  - HQ: Ashton-under-Lyne
- Subdivisions
  - Type: Civil parishes

Limehurst was, from 1894 to 1954, a rural district in the administrative county of Lancashire, England.

== History ==
Ashton-under-Lyne Rural Sanitary District was created in 1872 and included parishes in both Cheshire and Lancashire. The Local Government Act 1894 redesignated rural sanitary districts as rural districts, and where they crossed county boundaries they were generally divided. Accordingly, the area of Ashton RSD was divided with the Lancashire parishes forming Limehurst Rural District and the Cheshire parishes becoming Tintwistle Rural District.

Over time the rural district became increasingly urbanised, and it lost areas to surrounding boroughs and urban districts in 1914, 1935 and 1951. In 1954 the district was abolished, with its area passing to five neighbouring towns.

== Parishes ==
The rural district originally consisted of seven parishes:

- Alt
- Bardsley
- Crossbank
- Hartshead
- Little Moss
- Waterloo
- Woodhouses

Six of the parishes formed an area bounded to the north by Failsworth and Oldham and to the south by Ashton-under-Lyne, Mossley and Droylsden. The parish of Crossbank formed an exclave, lying to the north of Lees Urban District.

== Contraction and abolition ==
The rural district was altered as follows:

- The County of Lancaster (Lees and Crossbank) Confirmation Order 1914 abolished the parish of Crossbank and transferred its area to Lees Urban District.
- The parish of Hartshead was transferred to the Borough of Ashton-under-Lyne in 1935.
- In 1951 the Oldham Extension Act 1950 (14 Geo. 6. c. lv) transferred 605 acres (2.45 km^{2}) to the County Borough of Oldham
- On abolition in 1954 the rural district was divided between the Borough of Ashton-under-Lyne (1,154 acres), County Borough of Oldham (1,052 acres), Failsworth Urban District (606 acres), Droylsden Urban District (235 acres) and the Borough of Mossley (37 acres).
