= Oldham =

Town in Greater Manchester, England

- Town
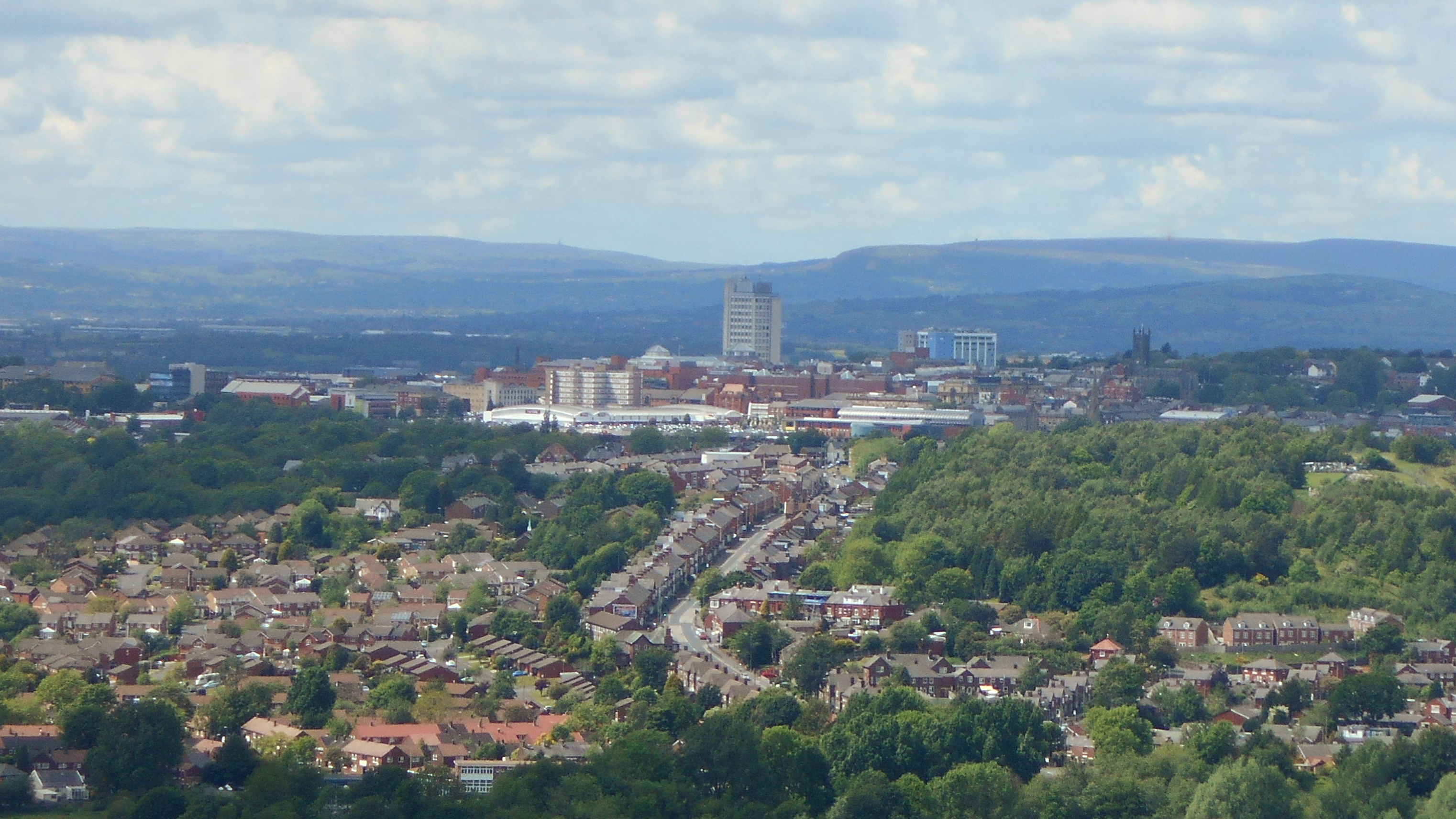
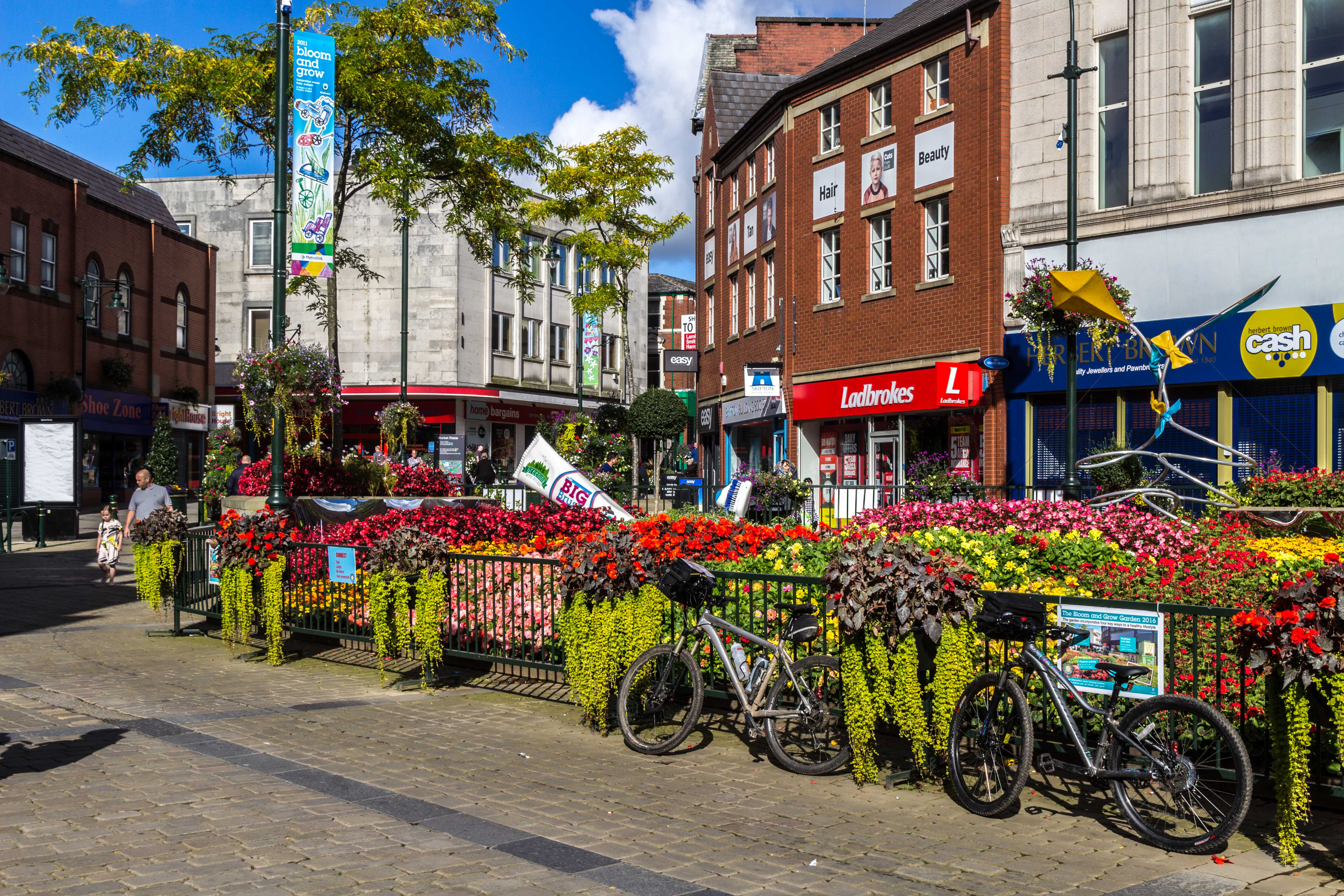
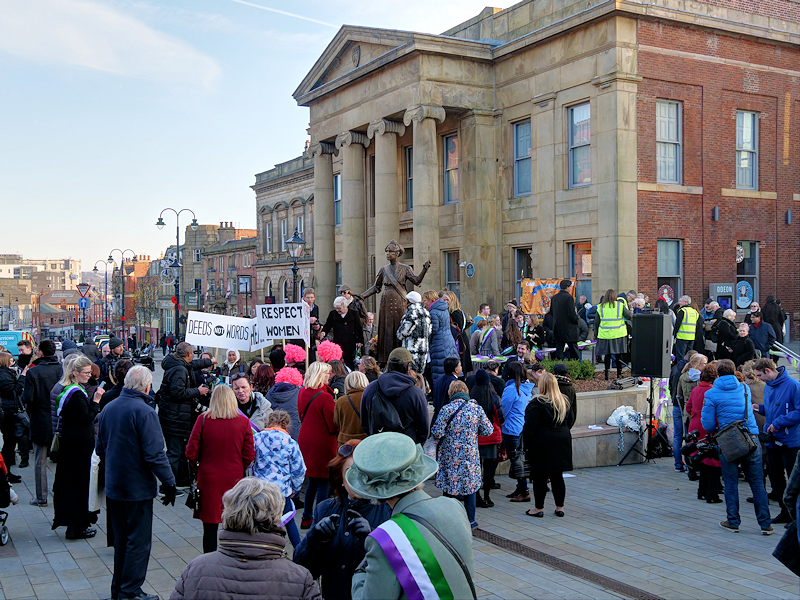
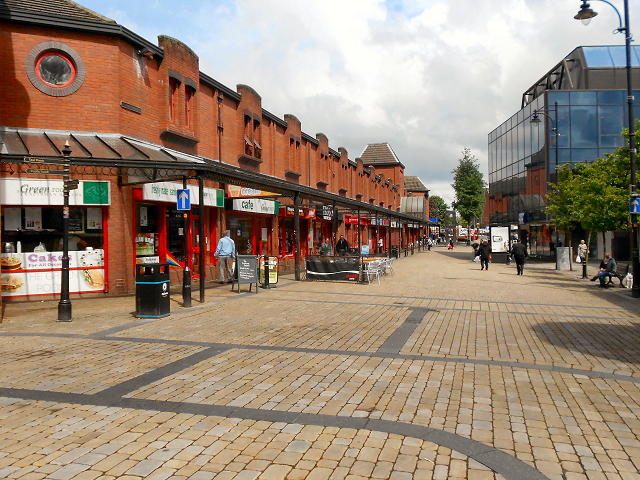
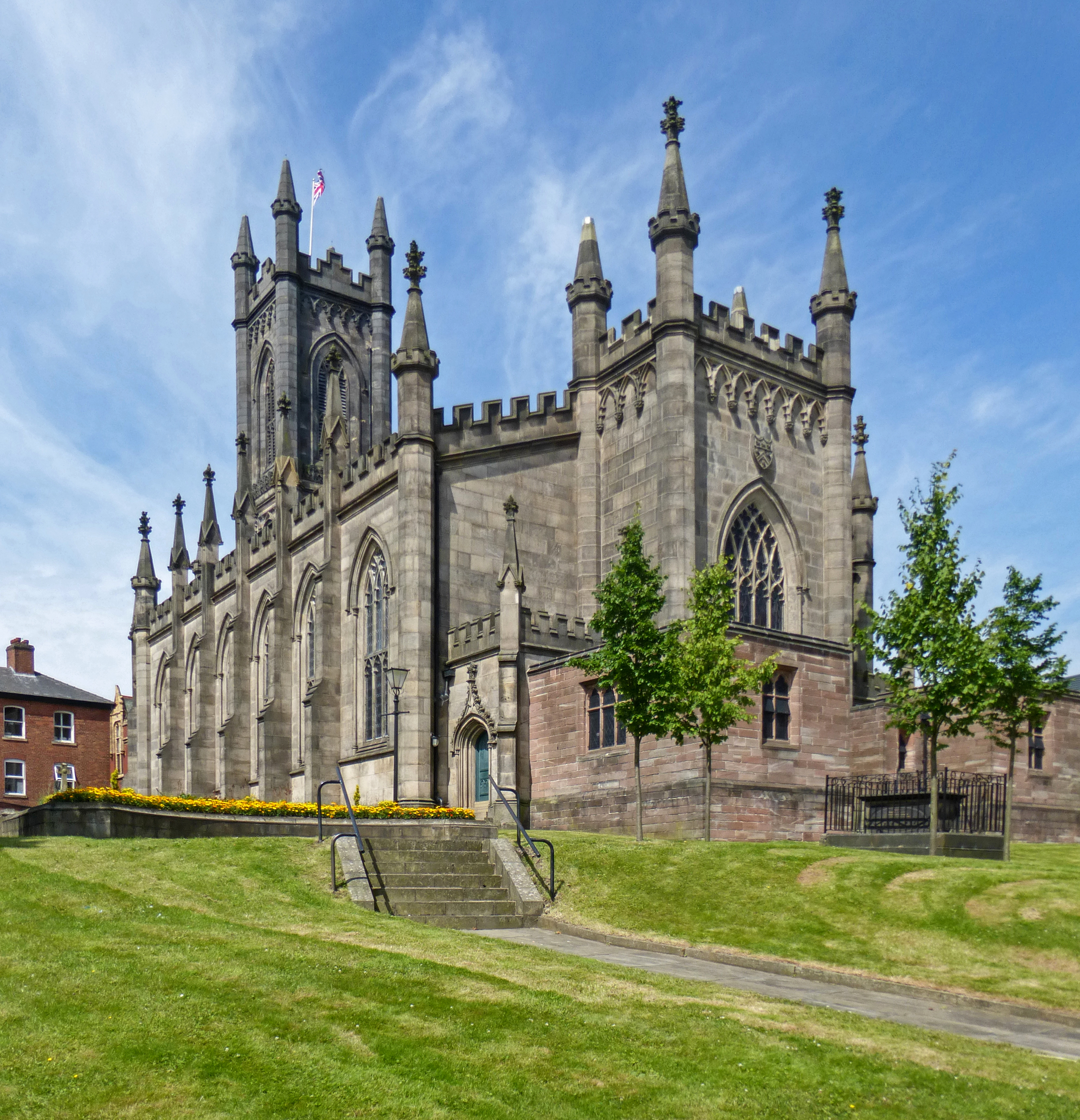
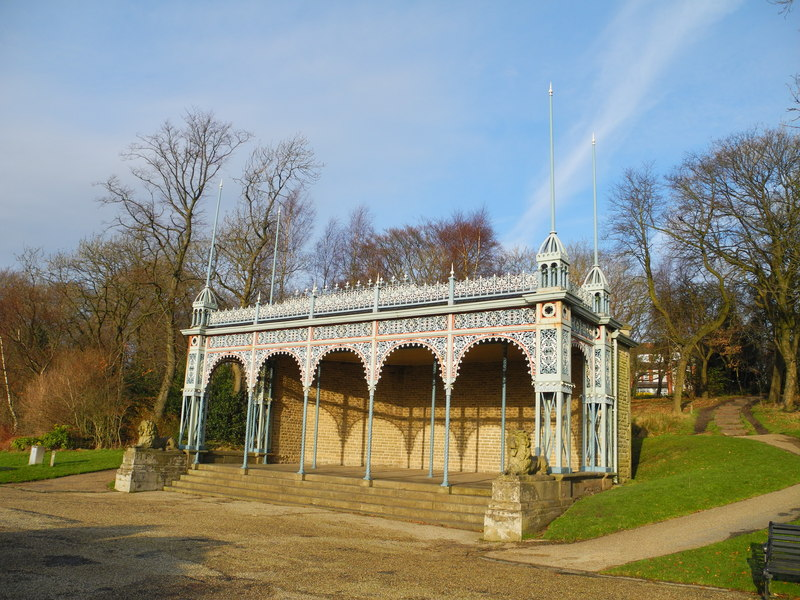
- Oldham skyline Market Place Old Town Hall Tommyfield Market Church of St Mary with St Peter Alexandra Park

- Location within Greater Manchester
- Area: 55 sq mi (140 km^{2})
- Population: 110,718 (2021 Census)
  - Density: 5,785/sq mi (2,234/km^{2})
- OS grid reference: SD922053
  - London: 164 mi (264 km) SSE
- Metropolitan borough: Oldham
- Metropolitan county: Greater Manchester
- Region: North West
- Country: England
- Sovereign state: United Kingdom
- Areas of the town: List: Alt (part); Coldhurst; Copster Hill; Derker; Featherstall; Fitton Hill; Freehold; Glodwick; Hathershaw; Hollins; Lime Side; Moorside; Clarksfield; Sholver; Spring Hill; Top o' th' Meadows; Town Centre; Watersheddings; Werneth
- Post town: Oldham
- Postcode district: OL1-OL4, OL8, OL9
- Dialling code: 0161
- Police: Greater Manchester
- Fire: Greater Manchester
- Ambulance: North West
- UK Parliament: Oldham East and Saddleworth; Oldham West, Chadderton and Royton

Oldham (/ˈoʊldəm/) is a town in Greater Manchester, England. It lies amongst the Pennines on elevated ground between the rivers Irk and Medlock, 5 miles (8 km) southeast of Rochdale, and 7 miles (11 km) northeast of Manchester City Centre. It is the administrative centre of the Metropolitan Borough of Oldham, which had a population of 242,003 in 2021.

Within the boundaries of the historic county of Lancashire, and with little early history to speak of, Oldham rose to prominence in the 19th century as an international centre of textile manufacture. It was a boomtown of the Industrial Revolution, and among the first ever industrialised towns, rapidly becoming "one of the most important centres of cotton and textile industries in England." At its zenith, it was the most productive cotton spinning mill town in the world, producing more cotton than France and Germany combined. Oldham's textile industry fell into decline in the mid-20th century; the town's last mill closed in 1998.

The demise of textile processing in Oldham depressed and heavily affected the local economy. The town centre is the focus of a project that aims to transform Oldham into a centre for further education and the performing arts. It is, however, still distinguished architecturally by the surviving cotton mills and other buildings associated with that industry.

In the 2021 United Kingdom census Oldham built-up area subdivision, as defined by the Office for National Statistics, had a population of 110,718 and an area of 1,639 hectares (6.33 sq mi), giving a population density of 67.57 inhabitants per hectare (17,500/sq mi), while the Borough of Oldham had a population of 242,003, an area of 1,424 hectares (5.50 sq mi), and a population density of 17.29 inhabitants per hectare (4,480/sq mi).

== History ==
=== Toponymy ===
The toponymy of Oldham seems to imply "old village or place" from Eald (Saxon) signifying oldness or antiquity, and Ham (Saxon) a house, farm or hamlet. Oldham is however known to be a derivative of Aldehulme, undoubtedly an Old Norse name. It is believed by some to be derived from the Old English ald combined with the Old Norse holmi or holmr, meaning "promontory or outcrop", possibly describing the town's hilltop position. It has alternatively been suggested that it may mean "holm or hulme of a farmer named Alda". The name is understood to date from 865, during the period of the Danelaw. Cumbric alt, meaning "steep height, cliff", has also been suggested for the first element.

=== Early history ===
The earliest known evidence of a human presence in what is now Oldham is attested by the discovery of Neolithic flint arrow-heads and workings found at Werneth and Besom Hill, implying habitation 7–10,000 years ago. Evidence of later Roman and Celtic activity is confirmed by an ancient Roman road and Bronze Age archaeological relics found at various sites within the town. Placenames of Celtic origin are still to be found in Oldham: Werneth derives from a Celtic personal name identical to the Gaulish vernetum, "alder swamp", and Glodwick may be related to the modern Welsh clawdd, meaning "dyke" or "ditch". Nearby Chadderton is also pre-Anglo-Saxon in origin, from the Old Welsh cadeir, itself deriving from the Latin cathedra meaning "chair". Although Anglo-Saxons occupied territory around the area centuries earlier, Oldham as a permanent, named place of dwelling is believed to date from 865, when Danish invaders established a settlement called Aldehulme.

From its founding in the 9th century until the Industrial Revolution, Oldham is believed to have been little more than a scattering of small and insignificant settlements spread across the moorland and dirt tracks that linked Manchester to York. Although not mentioned in the Domesday Book, Oldham does appear in legal documents from the Middle Ages, invariably recorded as territory under the control of minor ruling families and barons. In the 13th century, Oldham was documented as a manor held from the Crown by a family surnamed Oldham, whose seat was at Werneth Hall. Richard de Oldham was recorded as lord of the manor of Werneth/Oldham (1354). His daughter and heiress, Margery (d.1384), married John de Cudworth (d.1384), from whom descended the Cudworths of Werneth Hall who were successive lords of the manor. A Member of this family was James I's Chaplain, Ralph Cudworth (father of the Cambridge Platonist philosopher Ralph Cudworth). The Cudworths remained lords of the manor until their sale of the estate (1683) to Sir Ralph Assheton of Middleton.

=== Industrial Revolution and cotton ===
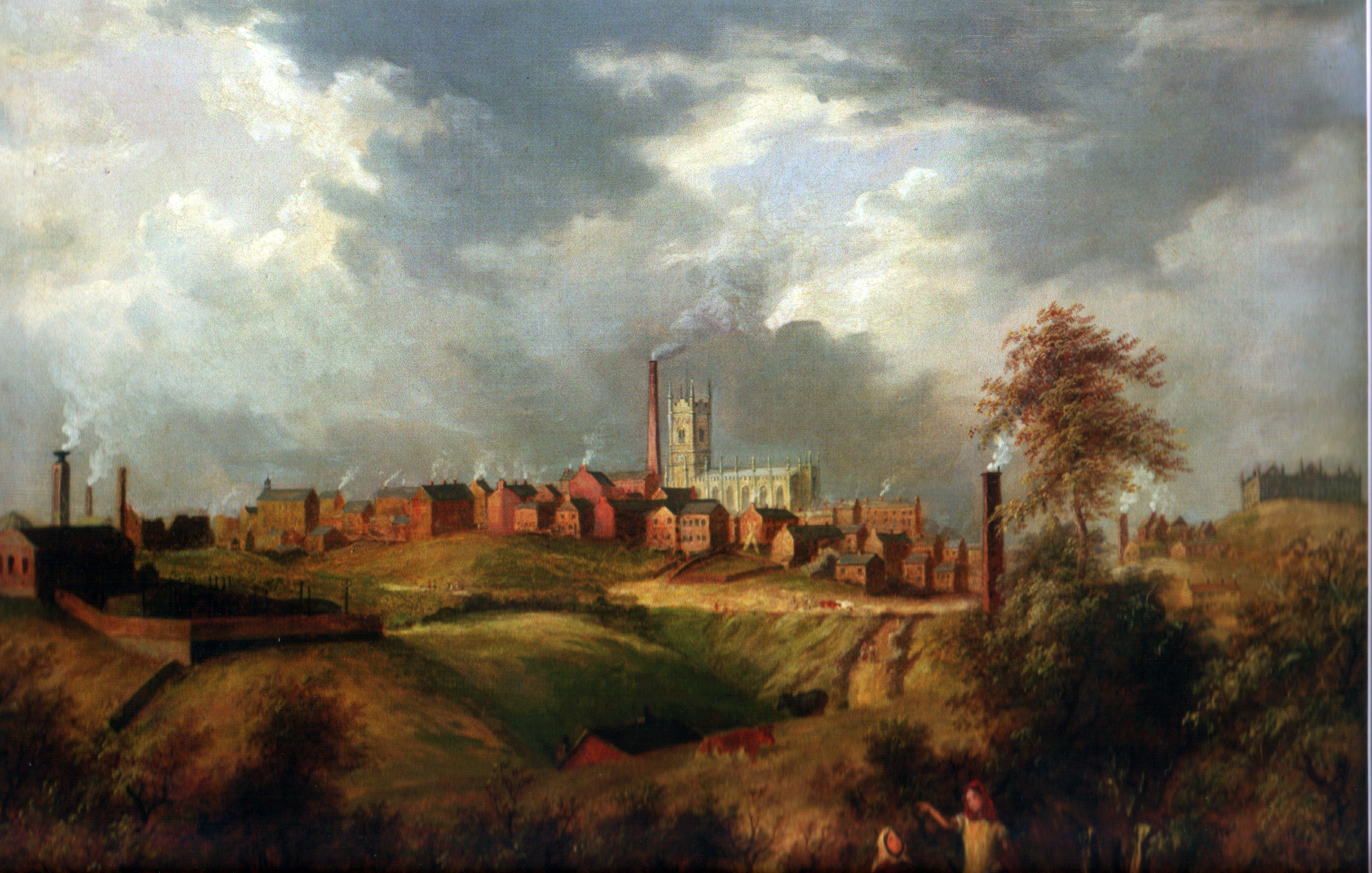
Oldham from Glodwick by James Howe Carse (1831), depicts the early skyline and industrial activities of Oldham. All the green space has since been urbanised.

Much of Oldham's history is concerned with textile manufacture during the Industrial Revolution; it has been said that "if ever the Industrial Revolution placed a town firmly and squarely on the map of the world, that town is Oldham." Oldham's soils were too thin and poor to sustain crop growing, and so for decades prior to industrialisation the area was used for grazing sheep, which provided the raw material for a local woollen weaving trade.

By 1756, Oldham had emerged as a centre of the hatting industry in England. The rough felt used in the production process is the origin of the term "Owdham Roughyed" a nickname for people from Oldham. It was not until the last quarter of the 18th century that Oldham changed from being a cottage industry township producing woollen garments via domestic manual labour, to a sprawling industrial metropolis of textile factories. The climate, geology, and topography of Oldham were unrelenting constraints upon the social and economic activities of the human inhabitants. At 700 feet (200 m) above sea level and with no major river or visible natural resources, Oldham had poor geographic attributes compared with other settlements for investors and their engineers. As a result, Oldham played no part in the initial period of the Industrial Revolution, although it did later become seen as obvious territory to industrialise because of its convenient position between the labour forces of Manchester and southwest Yorkshire.

Cotton spinning and milling were introduced to Oldham when its first mill, Lees Hall, was built by William Clegg in about 1778, the beginning of a spiralling process of urbanisation and socioeconomic transformation. Within a year, 11 other mills had been constructed, and by 1818 there were 19 – not a large number in comparison with other local settlements. Oldham's small local population was greatly increased by the mass migration of workers from outlying villages, resulting in a population increase from just over 12,000 in 1801 to 137,000 in 1901. The speed of this urban growth meant that Oldham, with little pre-industrial history to speak of, was effectively born as a factory town.

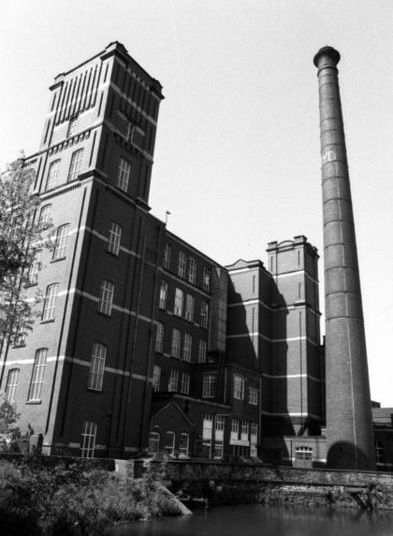
Royd mill, built in 1907, and seen here in 1983, was one of the more than 360 textile mills that operated night and day during Oldham's peak.

Oldham became the world's manufacturing centre for cotton spinning in the second half of the 19th century. In 1851, over 30% of Oldham's population was employed within the textile sector, compared to 5% across Great Britain. It overtook the major urban centres of Manchester and Bolton as the result of a mill building boom in the 1860s and 1870s, a period during which Oldham became the most productive cotton-spinning town in the world. In 1871, Oldham had more spindles than any country in the world except the United States, and in 1909, was spinning more cotton than France and Germany combined. By 1911 there were 16.4 million spindles in Oldham, compared with a total of 58 million in the United Kingdom and 143.5 million in the world; in 1928, with the construction of the UK's largest textile factory Oldham reached its manufacturing zenith. At its peak, there were more than 360 mills, operating night and day;

Oldham's townscape was dominated by distinctive rectangular brick-built mills. Oldham was hit hard by the Lancashire Cotton Famine of 1861–1865, when supplies of raw cotton from the United States were cut off. Wholly reliant upon the textile industry, the cotton famine created chronic unemployment in the town. By 1863 a committee had been formed, and with aid from central government, land was purchased with the intention of employing local cotton workers to construct Alexandra Park, which opened on 28 August 1865. Said to have over-relied upon the textile sector, as the importation of cheaper foreign yarns grew during the 20th century, Oldham's economy declined into a depression, although it was not until 1964 that Oldham ceased to be the largest centre of cotton spinning. In spite of efforts to increase the efficiency and competitiveness of its production, the last cotton spun in the town was in 1998.

==== Engineering ====
Facilitated by its flourishing textile industry, Oldham developed extensive structural and mechanical engineering sectors during the 18th and 19th centuries. The manufacture of spinning and weaving machinery in Oldham belongs to the last decade of the 19th century, when it became a leading centre in the field of engineering. The Platt Brothers, originated in nearby Dobcross village, but moved to Oldham. They were pioneers of cotton-spinning machinery, developing innovative products that enabled the mass-production of cotton yarn. Platt Brothers became the largest textile machine makers in the world, employing over 15,000 people in the 1890s, twice the number of their nearest rivals Dobson & Barlow in Bolton and Asa Lees on Greenacres Moor. They were keen investors in the local area and at one time, were supporting 42% of the population. The centre of the company lay at the New Hartford Works in Werneth, a massive complex of buildings and internal railways on a site overlooking Manchester. The railway station which served this site later formed the basis of Oldham Werneth railway station. The main building exists to this day. Platts gained prestigious awards from around the world, and were heavily involved with local politics and civic pride in Oldham. John and James Platt were the largest subscribers for promoting Oldham from a township to a Borough, pledging £100 (more than double the next largest sum) in advance towards any expenses which may have been incurred by the Royal Charter. In 1854 John Platt was made the (fourth) Mayor of Oldham, an office he was to hold twice more in 1855–56 and 1861–62. John Platt was elected in 1865 to become a Member of Parliament (MP) for Oldham, and was re-elected in 1868; he remained in office until his death in 1872. A bronze statue of Platt existed in the town centre for years, though was moved to Alexandra Park. There have been recommendations for it to be returned to the town centre.

Abraham Henthorn Stott, the son of a stonemason, was born in nearby Shaw & Crompton in 1822. He served a seven-year apprenticeship with Sir Charles Barry, before starting a structural engineering practice in Oldham in 1847 that went on to become the pre-eminent mill architect firm in Lancashire. Philip Sydney Stott, third son of Abraham and later titled as Sir Philip Stott, 1st Baronet, was the most prominent and famous of the Stott mill architects. He established his own practice in 1883 and designed over a hundred mills in several countries. His factories, which improved upon his father's fireproof mills, accounted for a 40% increase in Oldham's spindles between 1887 and 1914.

Although textile-related engineering declined with the processing industry, leading to the demise of both Stotts and Platts, other engineering firms existed, notably electrical and later electronic engineers Ferranti in 1896. Ferranti went into receivership in 1993, but some of its former works continue in other hands. Part of the original Hollinwood site was operated by Siemens Metering and Semiconductor divisions. The remainder of the site is occupied by Mirror Colour Print Ltd; the printing division of Reach, which prints and distributes thirty-six major newspapers, and employs five hundred staff.

==== Coal mining ====
On the back of the Industrial Revolution, Oldham developed an extensive coal mining sector, correlated to supporting the local cotton industry and the town's inhabitants, though there is evidence of small scale coal mining in the area as early as the 16th century. The Oldham Coalfield stretched from Royton in the north to Bardsley in the south and in addition to Oldham, included the towns of Middleton and Chadderton to the west. The Oldham Coalfield was the site of over 150 collieries during its recorded history. Although some contemporary sources suggest there was coal mining in Oldham at a commercial scale by 1738, older sources attribute the commercial expansion of coal mining with the arrival in the town of two Welsh labourers, John Evans and William Jones, around 1770. Foreseeing the growth in demand for coal as a source of steam power, they acquired colliery rights for Oldham, which by 1771 had 14 colliers. The mines were largely to the southwest of the town around Hollinwood and Werneth and provided enough coal to accelerate Oldham's rapid development at the centre of the cotton boom. At its height in the mid-19th century, when it was dominated by the Lees and Jones families, Oldham coal was mainly sourced from many small collieries whose lives varied from a few years to many decades, although two of the four largest collieries survived to nationalisation. In 1851, collieries employed more than 2,000 men in Oldham, although the amount of coal in the town was somewhat overestimated however, and production began to decline even before that of the local spinning industry. Today, the only visible remnants of the mines are disused shafts and boreholes.

=== Social history ===
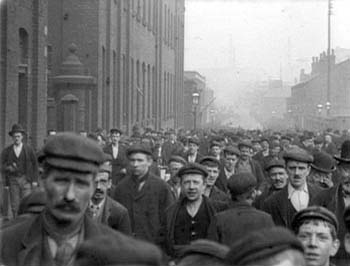
Workmen leaving Platt's Works, Oldham, 1900

Oldham's social history, like that of other former unenfranchised towns, is marked by politicised civil disturbances, as well as events related to the Luddite, Suffragette and other Labour movements from the working classes. There has been a significant presence of "friendly societies". It has been put that the people of Oldham became radical in politics in the early part of the 19th century, and movements suspected of sedition found patronage in the town. Oldham was frequently disturbed by bread and labour riots, facilitated by periods of scarcity and the disturbance of employment following the introduction of cotton-spinning machinery.

On 20 April 1812, a "large crowd of riotous individuals" compelled local retailers to sell foods at a loss, whilst on the same day Luddites numbering in their thousands, many of whom were from Oldham, attacked a cotton mill in nearby Middleton. On 16 August 1819, Oldham sent a contingent estimated at well above 10,000 to hear speakers in St Peter's Fields at Manchester discuss political reform; it was the largest contingent sent to Manchester. John Lees, a cotton operative and ex-soldier who had fought at Waterloo, was one of the fifteen victims of the Peterloo Massacre which followed. The 'Oldham inquest' which proceeded the massacre was anxiously watched; the Court of King's Bench, however, decided that the proceedings were irregular, and the jury were discharged without giving a verdict.

Annie Kenney, born in nearby Springhead, and who worked in Oldham's cotton mills, was a notable member of the Suffragette movement credited with sparking off suffragette militancy when she heckled Winston Churchill, and later (with Emmeline Pankhurst) the first Suffragist to be imprisoned. Oldham Women's Suffrage Society was established in 1910 with Margery Lees as president and quickly joined the Manchester and District Federation of the National Union of Women's Suffrage Societies. The Chartist and Co-operative movements had strong support in the town, whilst many Oldhamers protested in support of the emancipation of slaves. The Riot Act was read in 1852 on election day following a mass public brawl over the Reform Act, and irregularities with parliamentary candidate nominations.

For three days in late May 2001, Oldham became the centre of national and international media attention. Following high-profile race-related conflicts, and long-term underlying racial tensions between local White British against British Pakistani and British Bangladeshi communities, major riots broke out in the town. Occurring with particular intensity in the Glodwick and Coldhurst areas of the town, the 2001 Oldham riots were the worst racially motivated riots in the United Kingdom for fifteen years prior, briefly eclipsing the sectarian violence in Northern Ireland in the media. At least 20 people were injured in the riots, including 15 police officers, and 37 people were arrested. Similar riots took place in other towns in northern England over the following days and weeks. The 2001 riots prompted governmental and independent inquiries, which collectively agreed on community relations improvements and considerable regeneration schemes for the town. There were further fears of riots after the death of Gavin Hopley in 2002.

== Governance ==
=== Civic history ===
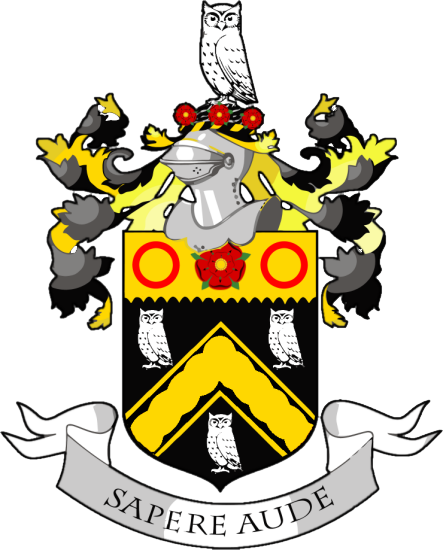
The coat of arms of the former County Borough of Oldham council, granted 7 November 1894, based upon those of an ancient local family surnamed Oldham. The owls suggest that the family, like the town, called itself 'Owdham', and adopted the birds in allusion to its name. The motto "Sapere aude" ("Dare to be wise") refers to the owls.

Lying within the historic county boundaries of Lancashire since the early 12th century, Oldham was recorded in 1212 as being one of five parts of the thegnage estate of Kaskenmoor, which was held on behalf of King John by Roger de Montbegon and William de Nevill. The other parts of this estate were Crompton, Glodwick, Sholver, and Werneth. Oldham later formed a township within the ancient ecclesiastical parish of Prestwich-cum-Oldham, in the hundred of Salford.

In 1826 commissioners for the social and economic improvement of Oldham were established. The town was made part of a parliamentary borough, in 1832, though it was in 1849 when Oldham was incorporated as a municipal borough, giving it borough status in the United Kingdom, and in 1850 the Borough Council obtained the powers of the improvement commissioners. In 1880, parts of the Hollinwood and Crossbank areas of Chadderton and Ashton-under-Lyne townships were added to the Borough of Oldham. Oldham Above Town and Oldham Below Town were, from 1851 until c. 1881, statistical units used for the gathering and organising of civil registration information, and output of census data.

The Local Government Act 1888 created elected county councils to administer services throughout England and Wales. Where a municipal borough had a population of more than 50,000 at the 1881 Census it was created a county borough, with the powers and duties of both a borough and county council. As Oldham had an 1881 population of 111,343 it duly became a county borough on 1 April 1889. The borough, while independent of Lancashire County Council for local government, remained part of the county for purposes such as the administration of justice and lieutenancy.

In 1951 parts of the Limehurst Rural District were added to the County Borough of Oldham, and in 1954 further parts of the same district added to it on its abolition. Since 1961, Oldham has been twinned with Kranj in Slovenia. Under the Local Government Act 1972, the town's autonomous county borough status was abolished, and Oldham has, since 1 April 1974, formed part of the Metropolitan Borough of Oldham, within the Metropolitan county of Greater Manchester.

=== Parliamentary representation ===
The boundaries of two parliamentary constituencies divide Oldham: Oldham East and Saddleworth, and Oldham West, Chadderton and Royton (which includes the town centre), represented by Labour Members of Parliament (MPs) Debbie Abrahams and Jim McMahon respectively.

Created as a parliamentary borough in 1832, Oldham's first parliamentary representatives were the radicals William Cobbett and John Fielden. Winston Churchill began his political career in Oldham. Although unsuccessful at his first attempt in 1899, Churchill was elected as the member of Parliament for the Oldham parliamentary borough constituency in the 1900 general election. He held the constituency for the Conservative Party until the 1906 general election, when he won the election for Manchester North West as a Liberal MP. After he became the prime minister of the United Kingdom in 1940, Churchill was made an honorary freeman of the Borough of Oldham, on 2 April 1941.

Oldham West, Chadderton and Royton	Oldham East and Saddleworth
Jim McMahon	Debbie Abrahams
Labour	Labour

=== Politics ===
In the 2016 European Union membership referendum, Oldham voted in favour of Brexit. The vote to leave was 60.9%.

== Geography ==
Oldham

Climate chart (precipitation, max. and min. temperature)
J	F	M	A	M	J	J	A	S	O	N	D
70 6 1	50 7 1	60 9 3	50 12 4	60 15 7	70 18 10	70 20 12	80 20 12	70 17 10	80 14 8	80 9 4	80 7 2
- █ Average max. and min. temperatures in °C
- █ Precipitation totals in mm
- Source: Records and averages, Yahoo! Weather, 2006, archived from the original on 21 April 2002
Imperial conversion
J	F	M	A	M	J	J	A	S	O	N	D
2.8 43 34	2 45 34	2.4 48 37	2 54 39	2.4 59 45	2.8 64 50	2.8 68 54	3.1 68 54	2.8 63 50	3.1 57 46	3.1 48 39	3.1 45 36
- █ Average max. and min. temperatures in °F
- █ Precipitation totals in inches

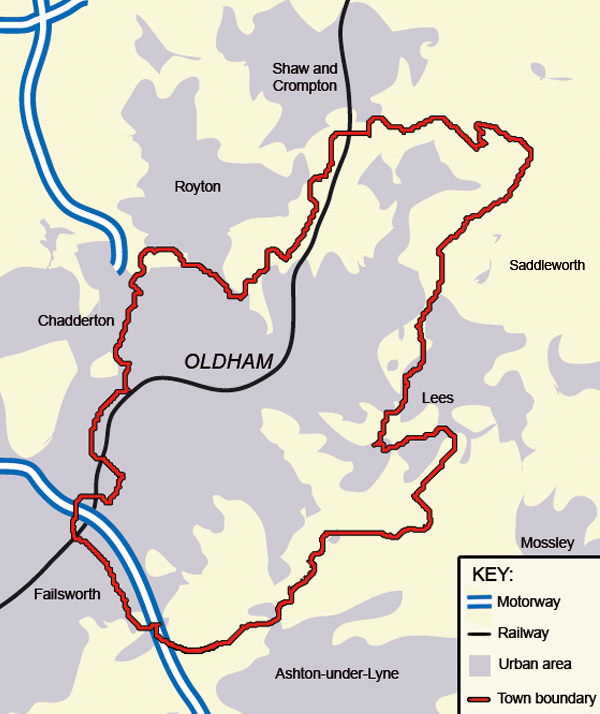
A map of Oldham, and surrounding area

At 53°32′39″N 2°7′0.8″W (53.5444°, −2.1169°), and 164 miles (264 km) north-northwest of London, Oldham stands 700 feet (213 m) above sea level, 6.9 miles (11.1 km) northeast of Manchester city centre, on elevated ground between the rivers Irk and Medlock. Saddleworth and the South Pennines are close to the east, whilst on all other sides, Oldham is bound by other neighbouring towns, including Ashton-under-Lyne, Chadderton, Failsworth, Royton and Shaw and Crompton, with little or no green space between them. Oldham experiences a temperate maritime climate, like much of the British Isles, with relatively cool summers and mild winters. There is regular but generally light precipitation throughout the year. On 23 November 1981, an F1/T2 tornado formed over Hollinwood and later passed over Oldham town centre, causing some damage.

Oldham's topography is characterised by its rugged, elevated Pennine terrain. It has an area of 6.91 square miles (17.90 km^{2}). The geology of Oldham is represented by the Millstone Grit and Coal Measures series of rocks. The River Beal, flowing northwards, forms the boundary between Oldham on one side and Royton and Shaw and Crompton on the other.

To the east of this river the surface rises to a height of 1,225 ft (373 m) at Woodward Hill, on the border with the parish of Saddleworth. The rest of the surface is hilly, the average height decreasing towards the southwest to Failsworth and the city of Manchester. The ridge called Oldham Edge, 800 ft (240 m) high, comes southward from Royton into the centre of the town.

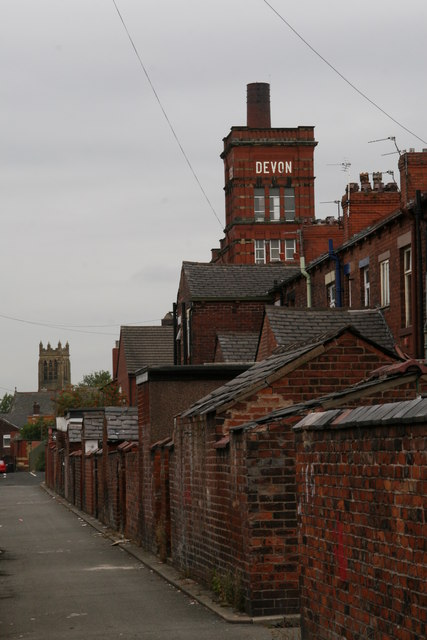
Oldham's irregularly constructed built environment is characterised by its red-brick cotton mills and surrounding terraced houses.

Oldham's built environment is characterised by its 19th-century red-brick terraced houses, the infrastructure that was built to support these and the town's former cotton mills – which mark the town's skyline. The urban structure of Oldham is irregular when compared to most towns in England, its form restricted in places by its hilly upland terrain. There are irregularly constructed residential dwellings and streets clustered loosely around a central business district in the town centre, which is the local centre of commerce. In 1849, Angus Reach of Inverness said:

The visitor to Oldham will find it essentially a mean-looking straggling town, built upon both sides and crowning the ridge of one of the outlying spurs which branch from Manchester, the neighbouring 'backbone of England'. The whole place has a shabby underdone look. The general appearance of the operatives' houses is filthy and smouldering.

— Angus Reach, Morning Chronicle, 1849

In the 1870s, John Marius Wilson described Oldham as consisting of:

... numerous streets, and contains numerous fine buildings, both public and private; but, in a general view, is irregularly constructed, presents the dingy aspect of a crowded seat of manufacture, and is more notable for factories than for any other feature.

— John Marius Wilson, Imperial Gazetteer of England and Wales (1870–1872)

Although Oldham had a thriving economy during the 19th century, the local merchants were broadly reluctant to spend on civic institutions, and so the town lacks the grandeur seen in comparable nearby towns like Bolton or Huddersfield; public expenditure was seen as an overhead that undermined the competitiveness of the town. Subsequently, Oldham's architecture has been described as "mediocre". The town has no listed buildings with a Grade I rating.

There is a mixture of high-density urban areas, suburbs, semi-rural and rural locations in Oldham. There is some permanent grassland but overwhelmingly the land use in the town is urban. The territory of Oldham is contiguous with other towns on all sides except for a small section along its eastern and southern boundaries, and for purposes of the Office for National Statistics, forms the fourth largest settlement of the Greater Manchester Urban Area, the United Kingdom's third largest conurbation. The M60 motorway passes through the southwest of Oldham, through Hollinwood, and a heavy rail line enters Oldham from the same direction, travelling northeast to the town centre before heading northwards through Derker towards Shaw and Crompton.

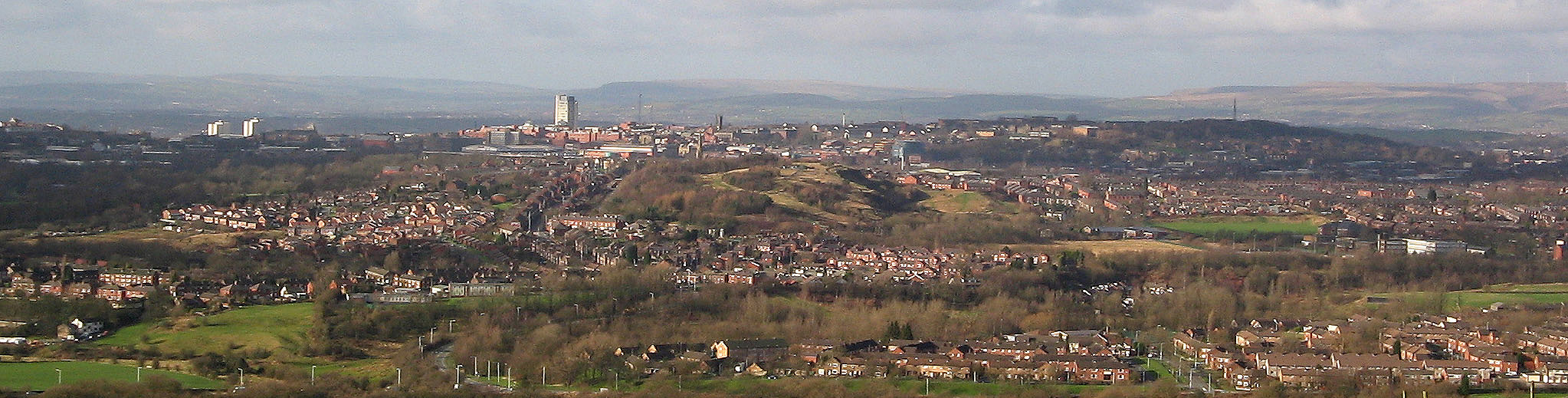
A panorama of Oldham looking from Hartshead Pike toward the north-west

=== Divisions and suburbs ===
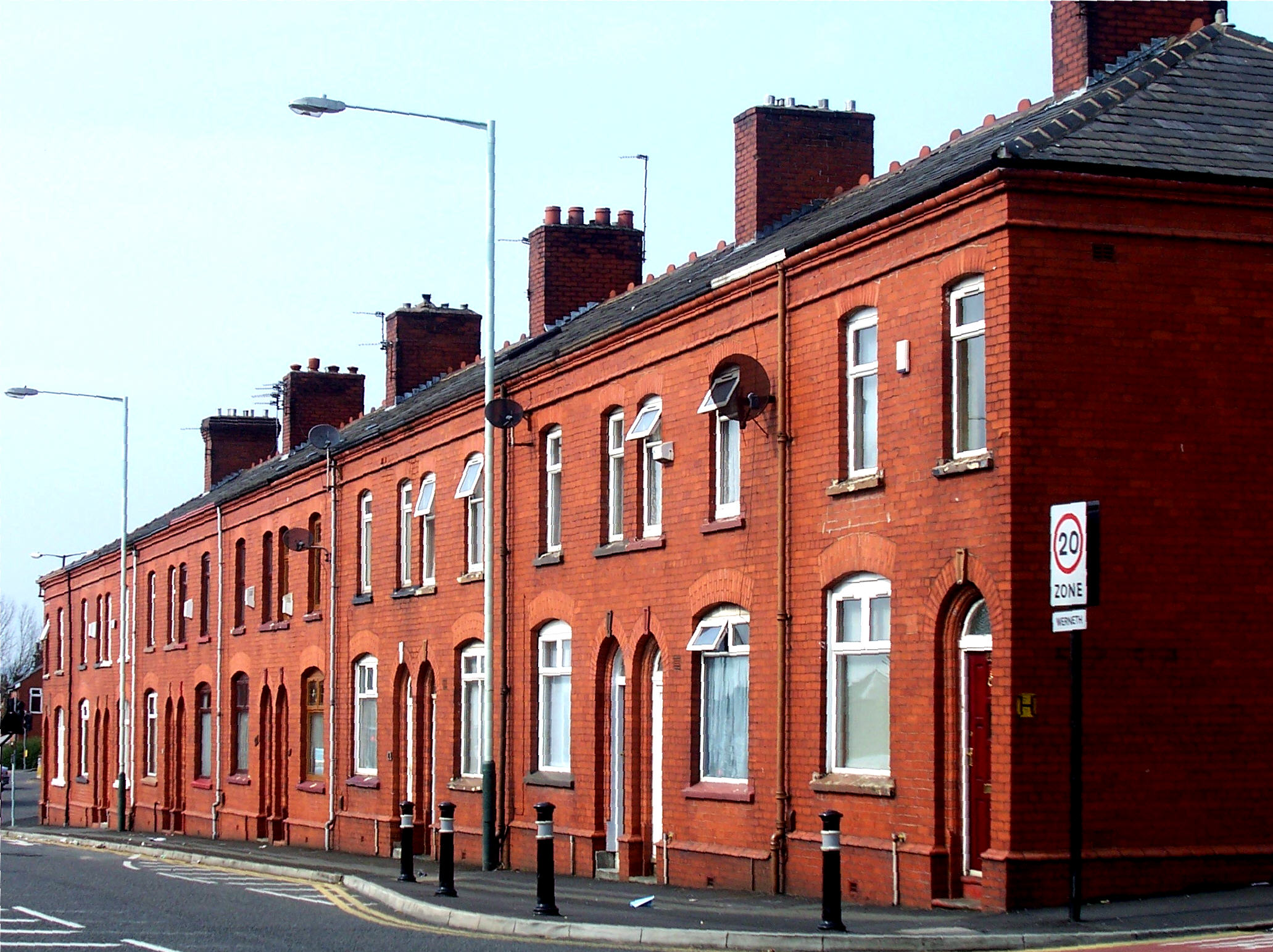
Frederick Street, in Werneth. Much of Oldham's housing stock is two-up-two-down rows of terraced houses, a reminder of its mill town history.

Many of Oldham's present divisions and suburbs have origins as pre-industrial hamlets, manorial commons and ancient chapelries. Some, such as Moorside, exist as recently constructed residential suburbia, whilst places like Hollinwood exist as electoral wards and thoroughly industrialised districts. Throughout most of its recorded history, Oldham was surrounded by large swathes of moorland, which is reflected in the placenames of Moorside, Greenacres moor, Littlemoor, Northmoor among others.

A large portion of Oldham's residences are "low value" Victorian era Accrington red-brick terraced houses in a row formation, built for the most part from 1870 to 1920, to house the town's cotton mill workers. There is more modern housing in the semi-rural east of the town, in the most sought after area in areas such as the village Moorside, although terraces are found in almost all parts of Oldham.

One of the oldest recorded named places of Oldham is Hathershaw, occurring in a deed for 1280 with the spelling Halselinechaw Clugh. Existing as a manor in the 15th century, Hathershaw Hall was the home of a Royalist family in the 17th century who lost part of their possessions due to the English Civil War. Waterhead, an upland area in the east of Oldham, traces its roots to a water cornmill over the border in Lees.

Recorded originally as Watergate and Waterhead Milne, it was for a long time a hamlet in the parish of Oldham that formed a significant part of the Oldham Above Town registration sub-district. Derker was recorded as a place of residence in 1604 with the name Dirtcar. Bound by Higginshaw to the north, Derker is the location of Derker railway station and, said to have terraced residencies "unsuited to modern needs", is currently being redeveloped as part of the Housing Market Renewal Initiative.

Coldhurst, an area along Oldham's northern boundary with Royton, was once a chapelry and the site of considerable industry and commerce, including coal mining, cotton spinning and hat manufacture. It is said to have been the scene of an action in the English Civil War in which the Parliamentarians were defeated.

== Demographics ==
Oldham compared
UK Census 2011	Oldham (Note: Percentages are taken from 2001 ward boundaries that together most closely match the territory of the former County Borough of Oldham.)	Oldham (Met. District)	England
Total population	96,555 (Note: The total population of Oldham is given as those within an urban area divorced from the Metropolitan Borough of Oldham.)	217,273	53,012,456
Foreign born	15%	8.2%	17.57%
White British	55.4%	77.5%	85.4%
Asian	37.6%	18.1%	7.8%
Black	2%	1.2%	3.5%
Christian	58%	73%	59.4%
Muslim	25%	11%	5%
Hindu	1.1%	0.1%	1.5%
No religion	8.3%	8.9%	24.7%
Over 65 years old	12%	14%	16.33%
Unemployed	5.5%	3.7%	(7.6–8.4%)

According to data from the United Kingdom Census 2001, Oldham had a total resident population of 103,544, making it the 55th most populous settlement in England, and the 5th most populous settlement of the Greater Manchester Urban Area. This figure in conjunction with its area provides Oldham with a population density of 3,998 people per square mile (1,544 people/km^{2}). The local population has been described as broadly "working class"; the middle classes tending to live in outlying settlements.

Oldham, considered as a combination of the 2001 electoral wards of Alexandra, Coldhurst, Hollinwood, St. James, St. Marys, St. Pauls, Waterhead and Werneth, has an average age of 33.5, and compared against the average demographics of the United Kingdom, has a high level of people of South Asian heritage, particularly those with roots in Pakistan and Bangladesh. Due to the town's prevalence as an industrial centre and thus a hub for employment, Oldham attracted migrant workers throughout its history, including those from wider-England, Scotland, Ireland and Poland.

During the 1950s and 1960s, in an attempt to fill the shortfall of workers and revitalise local industries, citizens of the wider Commonwealth of Nations were encouraged to migrate to Oldham and other British towns. Many came from the Caribbean and Indian subcontinent and settled throughout the Oldham borough.

Today, Oldham has large communities with heritage from Pakistan, India, Bangladesh and parts of the Caribbean. At the time of the 2001 census, over one in four of its residents identified themselves as from a South Asian or British Asian ethnic group. Cultural divisions along ethnic backgrounds are strong within the town, with poor cross-community integration and cohesion along Asian and white backgrounds.

With only a small local population during medieval times, as a result of the introduction of industry, mass migration of village workers into Oldham occurred, resulting in a population change from under 2,000 in 1714 to 12,000 in 1801 to 137,000 in 1901 In 1851 its population of 52,820 made Oldham the 12th most populous town in England. The following is a table outlining the population change of the town since 1801, which demonstrates a trend of rapid population growth in the 19th century and, after peaking at 147,483 people in 1911, a trend of general decline in population size during the 20th century.

Population of Oldham
Year	1801	1811	1821	1831	1841	1851	1861	1871	1881	1891
Population	12,024	16,690	21,662	32,381	42,595	52,820	72,333	82,629	111,349	131,463
Year	1901	1911	1921	1931	1939	1951	1961	1971	1981	1991
Population	137,246	147,483	144,983	140,314	120,511	121,266	115,346	105,922	107,830	103,931
Year	2001	2011	2021	Sources: A Vision of Britain through Time						
Population	103,544	96,555	110,718	Sources: A Vision of Britain through Time						

In 2011, 77.5% of the Oldham metropolitan borough population were White British, 18.1% Asian and 1.2% Black. While in the town of Oldham, which had a 2011 population of 96,555, 55.4% of the population were White British, 37.6% Asian and 2% Black.

== Economy ==
For years Oldham's economy was heavily dependent on manufacturing industry, especially textiles and mechanical engineering. Since the deindustrialisation of Oldham in the mid-20th century, these industries have been replaced by home shopping, publishing, healthcare and food processing sectors, though factory-generated employment retains a significant presence. Many of the modern sectors are low-skill and low-wage.

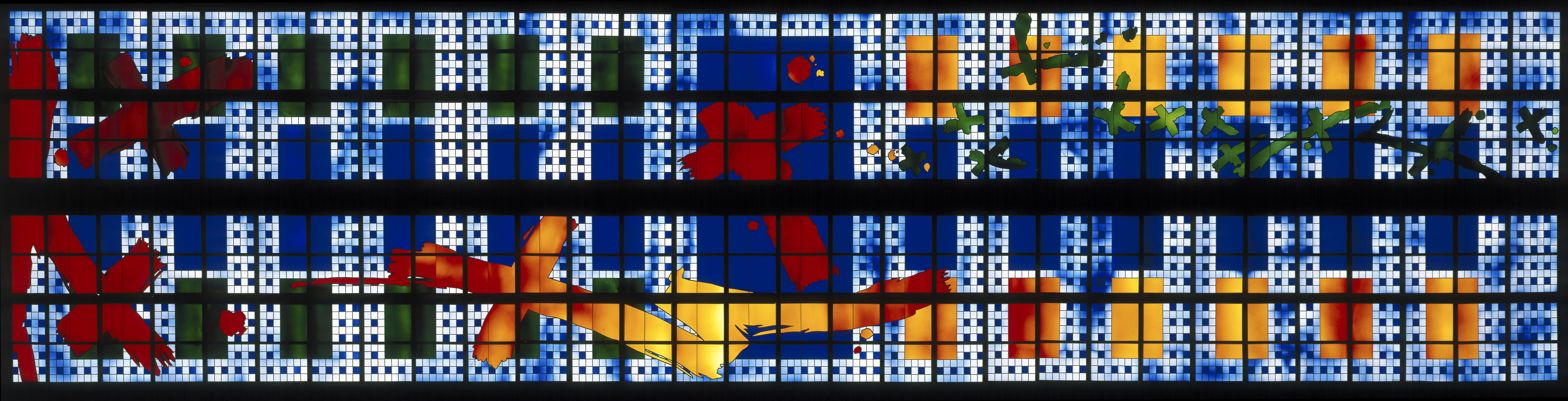
Stained-glass skylight of the Spindles Town Square Centre by local artist Brian Clarke, inspired by Oldham-born composer William Walton's Orb and Sceptre Coronation March. The work is one of three interrelated windows, among the largest stained-glass windows in Europe, designed and made between 1990 and 1993.

Oldham's town centre contains the highest concentration of retailing, cultural facilities and employment in the Metropolitan Borough of Oldham. It has been extensively redeveloped during the last few decades, and its two shopping centres, Town Square and the Spindles, now provide one of the largest covered retail areas in Greater Manchester. The Spindles (named with reference to textile spindles) is a modern shopping centre with over 40 retailers, banks, building societies and catering outlets. It houses several of Europe's largest stained glass works, a series of ceilings and skylights created by local artist Brian Clarke in celebration of the life and music of one of Oldham's famous sons, composer and conductor Sir William Walton.

A number of culinary and medical advances have been developed in Oldham. The tubular bandage was invented and developed in Oldham in 1961. That "vital contribution to advancing medical science" resulted from a collaboration between local firm Seton and a cotton manufacturer in the town. There are claims that Oldham was the birthplace of the first chip shop. The sometimes disputed claim of trade in deep-fried chipped potatoes is said to have been started around 1858–60 from an outlet owned by a John Lees, on what is the present site of Oldham's Tommyfield Market. In 1900 Oldham had the highest concentration of chip shops in the country, one for every 400 people. Rag Pudding is a savoury dish said to be native to Oldham. Yates Wine Lodge was founded in Oldham by Peter and Simon Yates in 1884.

Park Cake Bakeries, sold in 2007 by Northern Foods Group to Vision Capital, have a large food processing centre in Hathershaw, which employs in excess of 1,600 people. Over 90% of the cakes produced go to Marks & Spencer. Long existing as an industrial district, Hollinwood is home to the Northern Counties Housing Association,

Ferranti Technologies is an electronic, electromechanical and electrical engineering company based in Waterhead.

The majority of poor families are now working families. Coldhurst in Oldham has child deprivation rate of 62.1pc, which is the worst in the UK.

Oldham Athletic's contribution to the local economy have been strengthened by its community links as well as its fortunes on the field. Despite some success in the early 20th century which almost saw the club win the Football League title in 1915, the club has spent most of its time outside the top division of English football, including a 68-year spell between 1923 and 1991 – when it won promotion to the First Division a year before it became the FA Premier League. The club then survived for three years in the FA Premier League, which encouraged high attendances and boosted the club's finances as well as boosting the local economy as it struggled to recover from post-industrial decline. Between 1990 and 1994, the club also reached two FA Cup semi-finals (taking Manchester United to a replay on both occasions) and were on the losing side in a Football League Cup final. The club's subsequent years, however, have been less successful, with relegation in 2018 to the fourth tier of the English league for the first time in almost 50 years. The club's financial situation has also declined, as have its attendances, in accordance with fortunes on the pitch.

== Landmarks ==
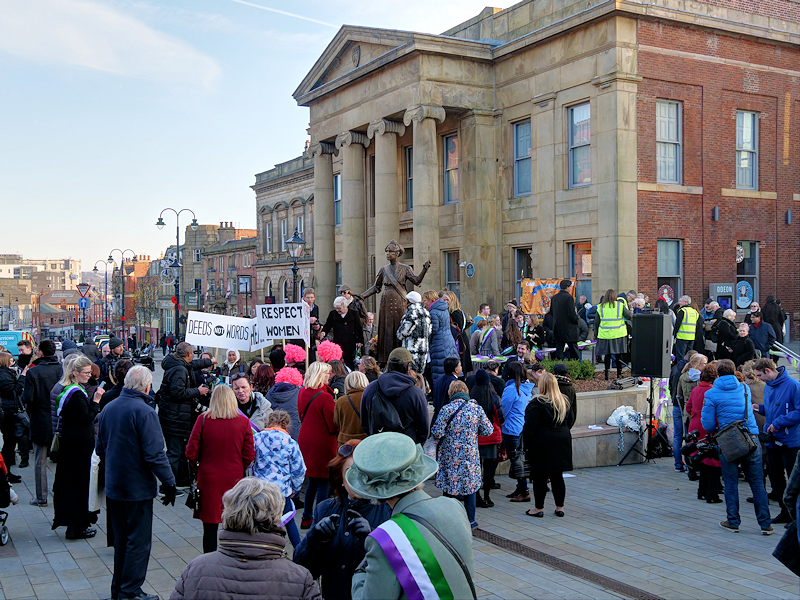
Oldham's old town hall, built in 1841, following its conversion into a multiplex cinema

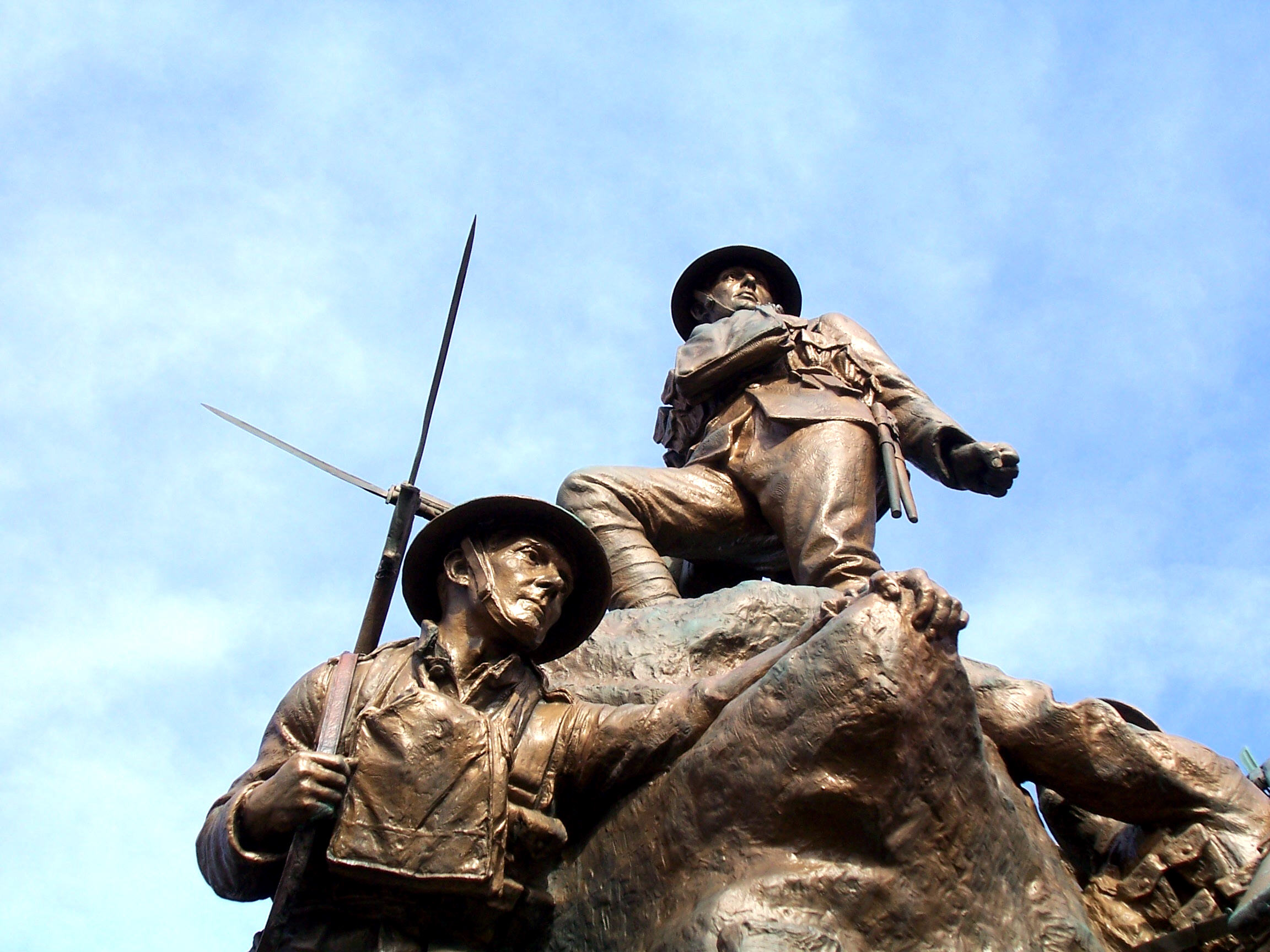
Oldham's war memorial was commissioned in 1919 to "symbolise the spirit of 1914–1918".

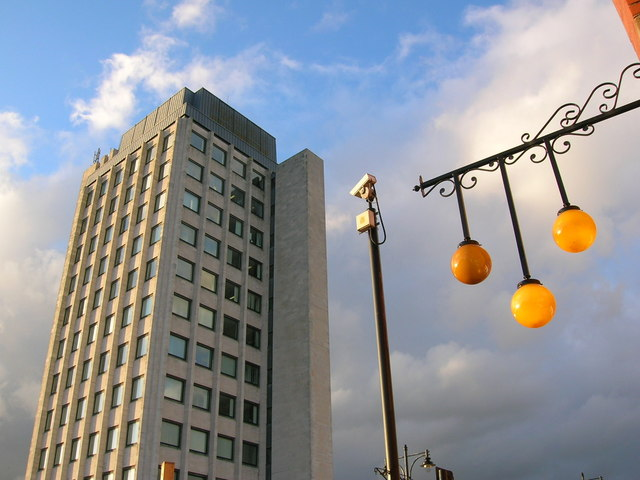
The civic centre is the Metropolitan Borough of Oldham's centre of local governance.

=== Town Hall ===
Oldham's Old Town Hall is a Grade II listed Georgian neo-classical town hall built in 1841, eight years before Oldham received its borough status. One of the last purpose-built town halls in northwest England, it has a tetrastyle Ionic portico, copied from the temple of Ceres, on the River Ilissos, near Athens. Winston Churchill made his inaugural acceptance speech from the steps of the town hall when he was first elected as a Conservative MP in 1900. A Blue Plaque on the exterior of the building commemorates the event. Long existing as the political centre of the town, complete with courtrooms, the structure stood empty for many years from the mid-1980s and was regularly earmarked for redevelopment as part of regeneration project proposals, but none were actioned before plans dating to 2012 were completed in 2016.

In September 2008, it was reported that "Oldham Town Hall is only months away from a major roof collapse". A tour taken by local councillors and media concluded with an account that "chunks of masonry are falling from the ceilings on a daily basis ... the floors are littered with dead pigeons and ... revealed that the building is literally rotting away". In October 2009 the Victorian Society, a charity responsible for the study and protection of Britain's Victorian and Edwardian architecture, declared Oldham Town Hall as the most endangered Victorian structure in England and Wales. Plans to convert the hall into a leisure complex, incorporating a cinema and restaurants, were revealed in May 2012 with the hall itself being used for public consultation. This £36.72 million project was completed in 2016.

In the heart of Oldham's retail district, the Old Town Hall has been developed into a modern multiplex Odeon cinema.

=== War memorial ===
Erected as a permanent memorial to the men of Oldham who were killed in the First World War, Oldham's war memorial consists of a granite base surmounted by a bronze sculpture depicting five soldiers making their way along the trenches in order to go into battle. The main standing figure, having climbed out of the trenches, is shown calling on his comrades to advance, and is the same figure used at the Royal Fusiliers War Memorial in London and the 41st Division memorial at Flers in France. The base serves to house books containing the roll of honour of the 1st, 10th and 24th Battalions, Manchester Regiment. The pedestal has two bronze doors at either side.

Commissioned in 1919 by the Oldham War Memorial Committee, the memorial was designed and built by Albert Toft. It was unveiled by General Sir Ian Hamilton on 28 April 1923, before a crowd estimated at over 10,000. The monument was intended to symbolise the spirit of 1914–1918.

The inscriptions on the memorial read:

- Over doors to the north: "DEATH IS THE GATE OF LIFE / 1914–1918"
- Over window to the south: "TO GOD BE THE PRAISE "

=== Civic Centre ===
The Civic Centre tower is the Metropolitan Borough of Oldham's centre of local governance. The chamber of the Mayor of Oldham can be located in the Civic Centre. The 15-storey white-brick building has housed the vast majority of the local government's offices since its completion in 1977. Standing at the summit of the town, the tower stands over 200 feet (60 metres) high. It was designed by Cecil Howitt & Partners, and the topping out ceremony was held on 18 June 1976. The Civic Centre can be seen as far away as Salford, Trafford, Wythenshawe and Winter Hill in Lancashire, and offers panoramic views across the city of Manchester and the Cheshire Plain.

=== Churches ===
The Oldham Parish Church of St. Mary with St. Peter, in its present form, dates from 1830 and was designed in the Gothic Revival Style by Richard Lane, a Manchester-based architect. It has been designated by English Heritage as a Grade II* listed building. It was linked with the church of St Mary the Virgin, Prestwich and together the sites were principal churches of the ancient ecclesiastical parish of Prestwich-cum-Oldham.

A church building had existed on the site since 1280. During this time, a small chapel stood on the site to serve the local townships of Oldham, Chadderton, Royton and Crompton. This was later replaced by an Early English Gothic church in the 15th century. With the coming of the Industrial Revolution, the population of Oldham increased at a rapid rate (from under 2,000 in 1714, to over 32,000 by 1831). The rapid growth of the local population warranted that the building be rebuilt into the current structure. Though the budget was originally agreed at £5,000, the final cost of building was £30,000, one third of which was spent on the crypt structure. Alternative designs by Sir Charles Barry, the designer of the Palace of Westminster, although now regarded by some as superior, were rejected. The Church, of the Anglican denomination, is in active use for worship, and forms part of the Diocese of Manchester.

There are also Roman Catholic churches in Oldham. These include Our Lady of Mount Carmel and St Patrick Church. It was built in 1870, was founded by priests from St Mary's Church in Oldham, and is a Grade II listed building.

== Transport ==
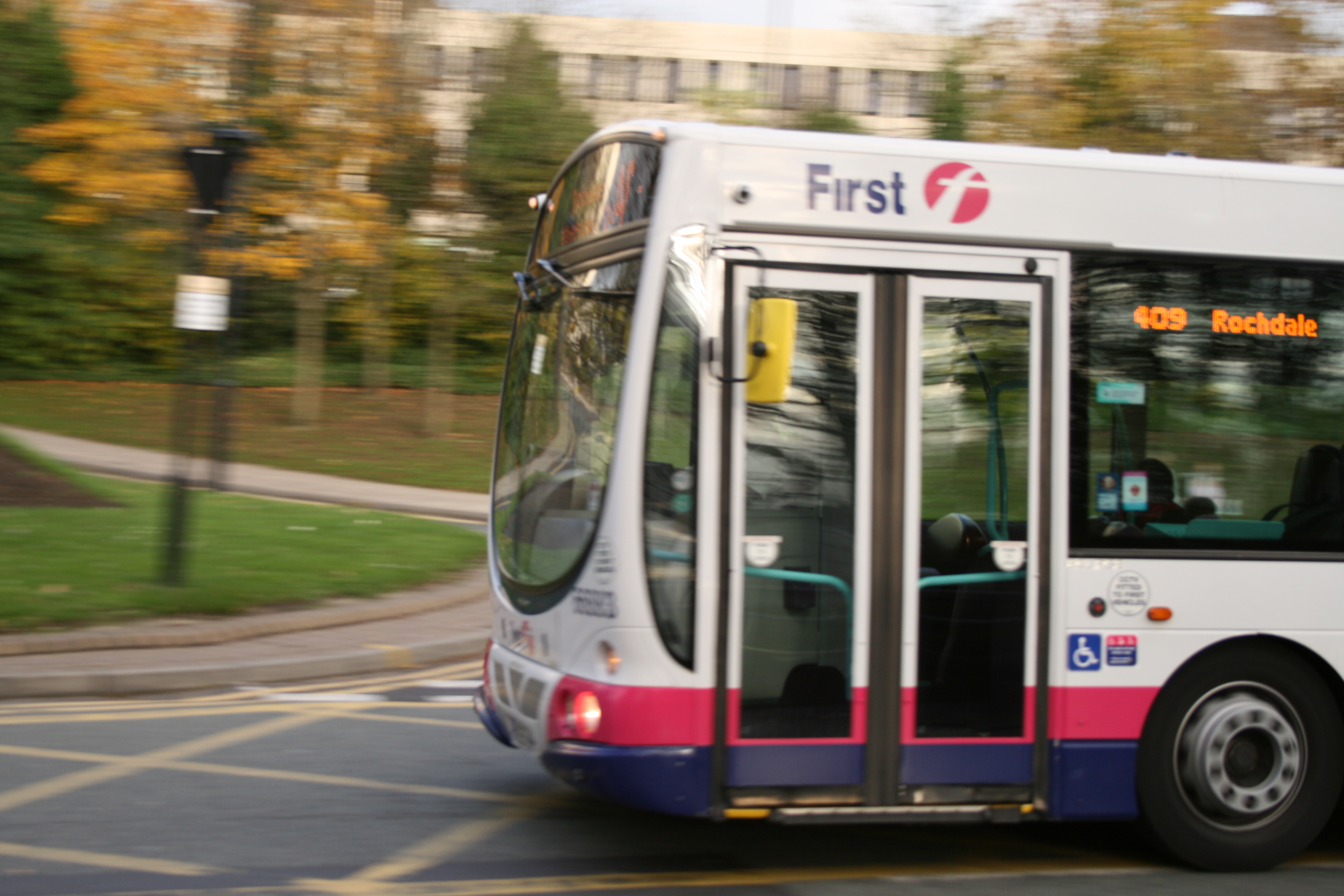
The 409 to Rochdale, pictured in Oldham's town centre. First Greater Manchester has its headquarters in Oldham, operating bus services throughout Greater Manchester.

The geography of Oldham constrained the development of major transport infrastructure, with the former County Borough Council suggesting that "if it had not grown substantially before the railway age it would surely have been overlooked". Oldham has never been on a main-line railway route, and canals too have only been able to serve it from a distance, meaning that "Oldham has never had a train service worthy of a town of its size".

A principal destination along the former Oldham Loop Line, Oldham once had six railway stations but this was reduced to three once Clegg Street, Oldham Central and Glodwick Road closed in the mid-20th century. Oldham Werneth, Oldham Mumps and Derker closed on 3 October 2009. Trains from Manchester Victoria station to Oldham had to climb steeply through much of its 6-mile (10-kilometre) route, from around 100 feet (30 metres) at Manchester city centre to around 600 ft (200 m) at Oldham Mumps. The Werneth Incline, with its gradient of 1 in 27, made the Middleton Junction to Oldham Werneth route the steepest regular passenger line in the country. The Werneth Incline route closed in 1963. It had been replaced as the main route to Manchester by the section of line built between Oldham Werneth Station and Thorpes Bridge Junction, at Newton Heath in May 1880. Oldham Mumps, the second oldest station on the line after Werneth, took its name from its location in the Mumps area of Oldham, which itself probably derived from the archaic word "mumper" which was slang for a beggar. The former Oldham Loop Line was converted for use with an expanded Metrolink light rail network, and renamed as the Oldham and Rochdale Line. The line between Victoria and a temporary Oldham Mumps tram stop opened on 13 June 2012, and more central stops opened on 27 January 2014.

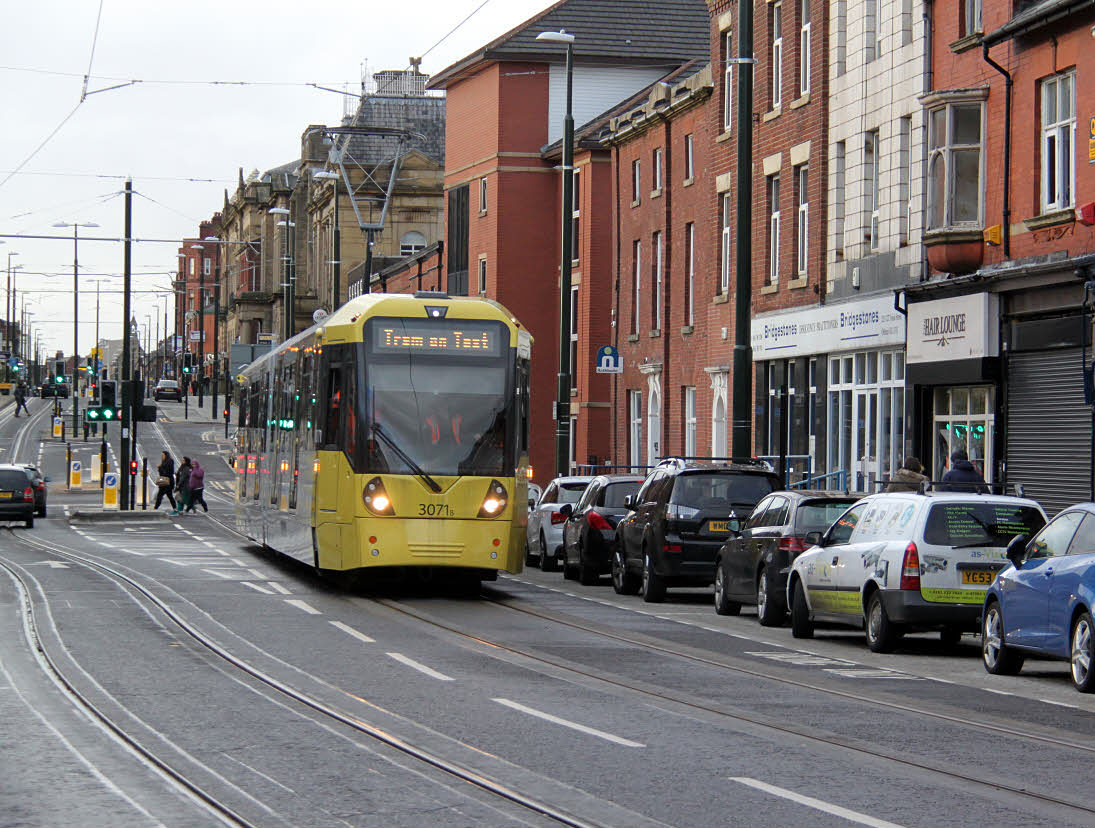
A Metrolink tram running through Union Street, on the Oldham town centre line opened in January 2014

Oldham had electric tramways to Manchester in the early 20th century; the first tram was driven from Manchester into Oldham in 1900 by the Lord Mayor of Manchester. The system came to an end on 3 August 1946, however. There was also a short-lived Oldham trolleybus system, in 1925–26. Oldham bus station has frequent bus services to Manchester, Rochdale, Ashton-under-Lyne and Middleton with other services to the Metropolitan Borough of Oldham, Tameside, and across the Pennines to Huddersfield in West Yorkshire. The roof canopy is supported internally on two rows of steel trees. The extensive use of glass and stainless steel maximises visibility, and there is a carefully co-ordinated family of information fittings, posters and seating, using robust natural materials for floors and plinths. The bus station is used by National Express coaches. First Greater Manchester has its headquarters in Oldham.

Despite the Turnpike Act 1734, Oldham had no turnpike road to Manchester for another 56 years and Church Lane, Oldham remained part of the main street through the town. But following a further Act of Parliament a turnpike was constructed. The first regular coach service to Manchester came into operation in October 1790, with a journey time of over 2 hours and a fare 2s.8d (about 13p), with half fare for travellers on top of the coach.

Oldham is about 4 miles (6 kilometres) south of the major M62 motorway, but is linked to it by the M60 at Hollinwood, and A627(M) via Chadderton. There are major A roads to Ashton-under-Lyne, Huddersfield, Manchester, and Rochdale.

The Hollinwood Branch of the Ashton Canal was a canal that ran from Fairfield in Droylsden, through Littlemoss and Daisy Nook Country Park to the Hollinwood area of Oldham, with a branch from Daisy Nook to the Fairbottom Branch Canal. The canal was mainly used for the haulage of coal until it fell into disuse for commercial traffic in the 1930s. It included four aqueducts and a two-rise lock staircase.

== Sport ==
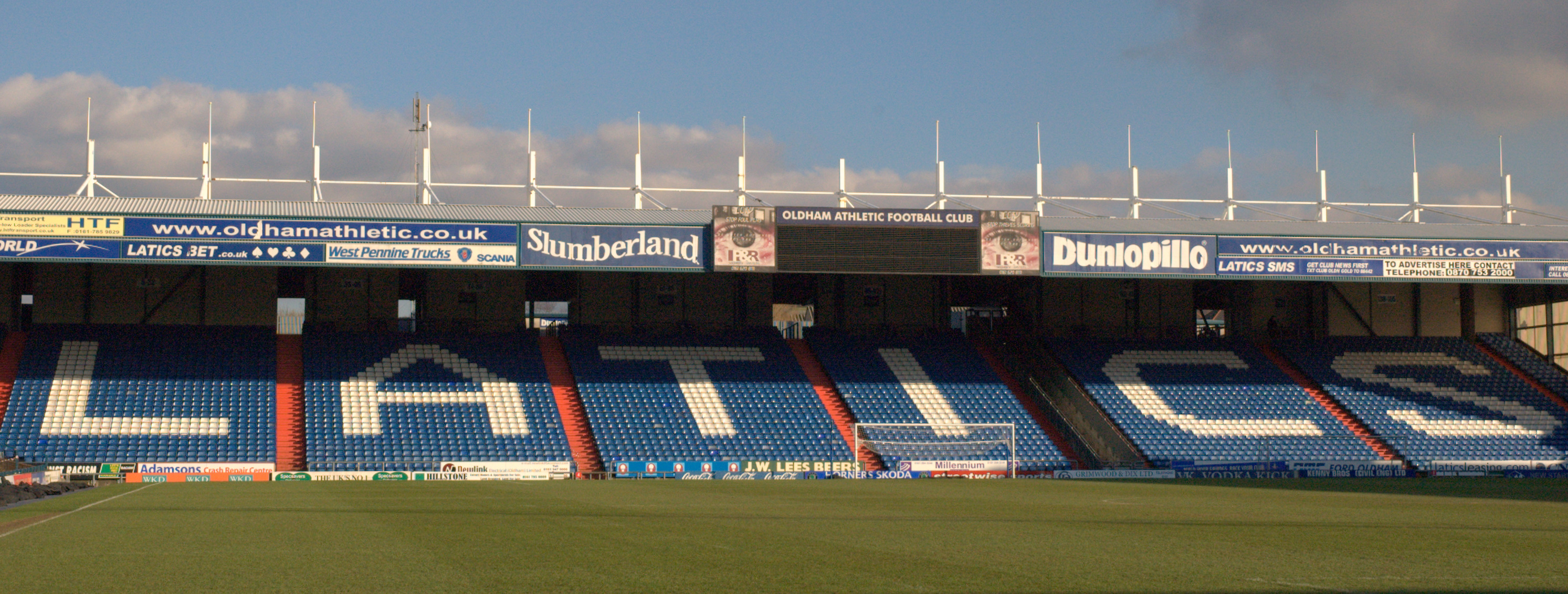
Boundary Park is Oldham's main sports stadium, and is used by Oldham Athletic A.F.C. and Oldham RLFC.

Oldham Rugby League Football Club was established in 1876 as Oldham Football Club. Renamed in 1997 to Oldham R.L.F.C., it has achieved several club honours during its history, winning the Rugby Football League Championship five times and Challenge Cup three times. They played at Watersheddings for years before joining Oldham Athletic A.F.C. at Boundary Park until 2010 when they moved to Oldham Borough's previous ground, Whitebank Stadium.

Oldham Athletic Association Football Club, known as The Latics, was founded in 1895 as Pine Villa Football Club. Oldham Athletic have achieved both league and cup successes, particularly under Joe Royle in the 1990s. They were Football League runners-up in the last season before the outbreak of the First World War, but were relegated from the First Division in 1923. They reached the League Cup final in 1990 and won the Second Division title in 1991, ending 68 years outside the top flight. They secured their top division status a year later to become founder members of the new Premier League, but were relegated after two seasons despite reaching that year's FA Cup semi-finals. A long slow fall through the divisions followed this relegation, until they established the unwanted record of being the first ever former Premier League club to lose their Football League status at the end of the 2021–22 season. After three seasons in the National League they won promotion back to EFL League Two via the playoffs at the end of the 2024–25 National League season.

Oldham Borough was established in 1964 as Oldham Dew FC, and after many years playing under the name of Oldham Town changed its name to Oldham Boro in 2009, finally becoming known as Oldham Borough just months before it folded. The team played in the North West Counties Football League before going out of existence in 2015, just over fifty years after it was founded.

Oldham Netball Club's senior team is the 2019–2020 national league division 1 champion and has won seven out of the last eight titles. Former players include England's most capped player Jade Clarke.

Oldham has league cricket teams with a number of semi-professional league clubs including Oldham CC, and Werneth CC, both playing in the Greater Manchester Cricket League (GMCL). Oldham CC was one of the founding members, in 1892, of the Central Lancashire Cricket League, which closed in 2015.

The Manchester Fencing Centre in Oldham opened in 2015 in the former Osborne Mill, and at 17,000 square feet (1,600 m^{2}) was said to be "the largest centre of its kind". The Marshall Fencing Club trains there, under head coach and Commonwealth games medallist Stuart Marshall, and in 2019 won six gold medals at eight national ranking events.

== Media ==
Local news and television programmes are provided by BBC North West and ITV Granada. Television signals are received from the Winter Hill TV transmitter, and one of the two local relay transmitters (Dog Hill and North Oldham).

Local radio stations are BBC Radio Manchester, Heart North West, Smooth North West, Greatest Hits Radio Manchester & The North West (formerly The Revolution), Capital Manchester and Lancashire, and community based radio stations: Oldham Community Radio and Radio Cavell that broadcast to hospital patients at Royal Oldham Hospital in the town.

Oldham local newspapers include the Oldham Advertiser and The Oldham Times.

== Education ==
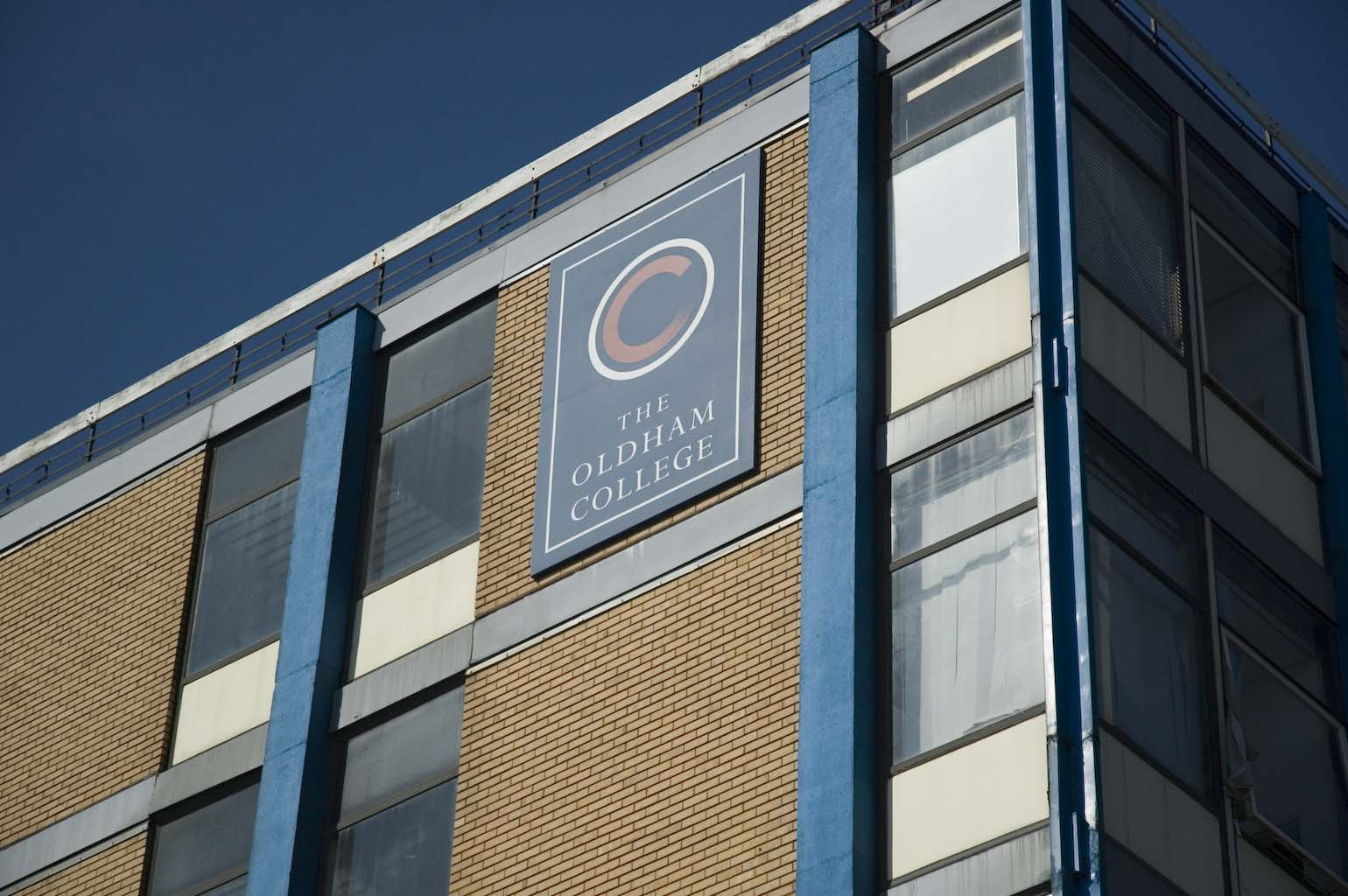
Oldham College is a centre for further education.

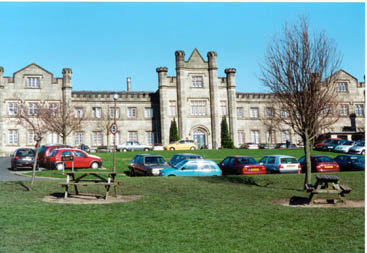
The Blue Coat School is one of Oldham's oldest schools, dating back to 1834.

Oldham produced someone who is considered to be one of the greatest benefactors of education for the nation, Hugh Oldham, who in 1504 was appointed as Bishop of Exeter, and later went on to found what is now Manchester Grammar School.

University Campus Oldham is a centre for higher education and a sister campus of the University of Huddersfield. It was opened in May 2005 by actor Patrick Stewart, the centre's chancellor. The University Campus Oldham presented actress Shobna Gulati and artist Brian Clarke (both born in Oldham) with an Honorary Doctorate of Letters at the Graduation Ceremony of November 2006, for their achievements and contributions to Oldham and its community.

School	Type/status	Ofsted report
The Blue Coat School	Secondary school and Sixth form college	137133
Hulme Grammar School	Grammar school	N/A
New Bridge School	Secondary special school	138697
Oasis Academy Oldham	Secondary school	136027
Oldham Academy North	Secondary school	136115
Oldham College	Further education college	130505
Oldham Sixth Form College	Sixth form college	145002
The Hathershaw College	Secondary school	137039

== Public services ==
Home Office policing in Oldham is provided by the Greater Manchester Police. The force's "(Q) Division" have their headquarters for policing the Metropolitan Borough of Oldham at central Oldham. Public transport is co-ordinated by Transport for Greater Manchester. Statutory emergency fire and rescue service is provided by the Greater Manchester Fire and Rescue Service, which has two stations in Oldham; at Hollins on Hollins Road, and at Clarksfield on Lees Road.

The Royal Oldham Hospital, at Oldham's northern boundary with Royton, is a large NHS hospital administered by Pennine Acute Hospitals NHS Trust. It was opened under its existing name on 1 December 1989. Formerly known as Oldham District and General, and occupying the site of the town's former workhouse (named Oldham Union Workhouse in 1851), the hospital is notable for being the birthplace of Louise Joy Brown – the world's first successful In vitro fertilised "test tube baby", on 25 July 1978.

Waste management is co-ordinated by the local authority via the Greater Manchester Waste Disposal Authority. Locally produced inert waste for disposal is sent to landfill at the Beal Valley. Oldham's distribution network operator for electricity is United Utilities; there are no power stations in the town. United Utilities also manages Oldham's drinking and waste water; water supplies being sourced from several local reservoirs, including Dove Stone and Chew. There is a water treatment works at Waterhead.

== Culture ==
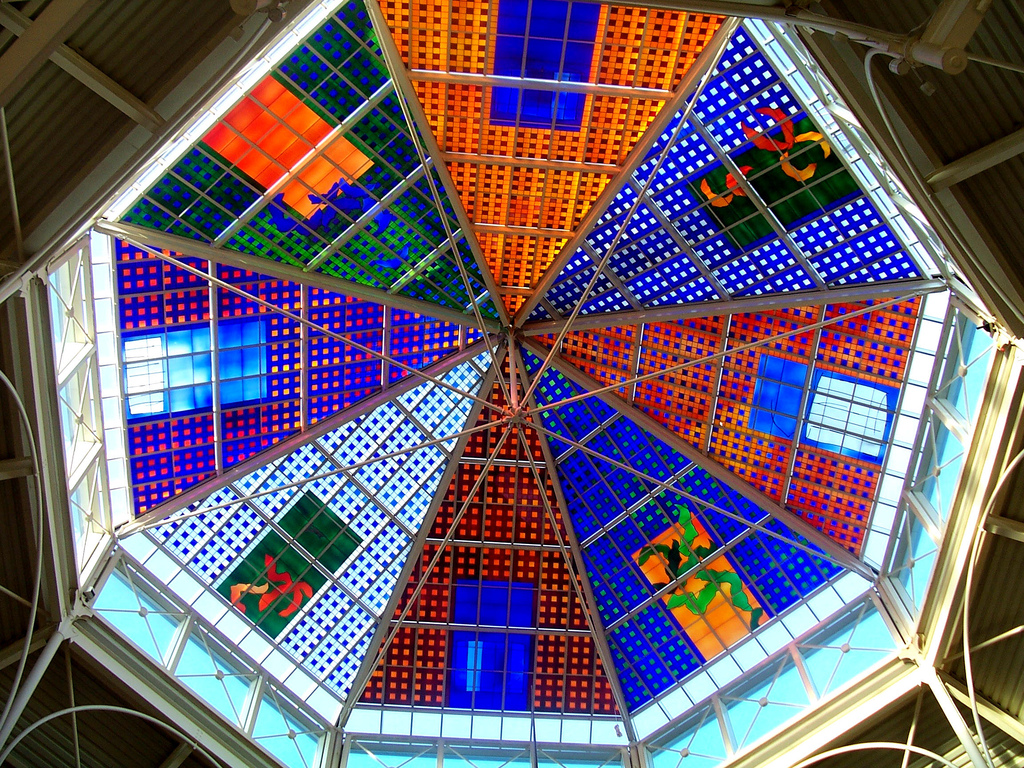
The stained glass rotunda of The Spindles Town Square Centre, one of Europe's largest works in the medium, created by local artist Brian Clarke

Oldham, though lacking in leisure and cultural amenities, is historically notable for its theatrical culture. Once having a peak of six "fine" theatres in 1908, Oldham is home to the Oldham Coliseum Theatre and the Oldham Theatre Workshop, which have facilitated the early careers of notable actors and writers, including Eric Sykes, Bernard Cribbins and Anne Kirkbride, daughter of acclaimed cartoonist Jack Kirkbride who worked for the Oldham Evening Chronicle. Oldham Coliseum Theatre is one of Britain's last remaining repertory theatres; Charlie Chaplin and Stan Laurel performed there in the early 20th century, and contemporary actors such as Ralph Fiennes and Minnie Driver, among others, have appeared more recently.

During the 19th century the circus was a popular entertainment in Oldham; Pablo Fanque's circus was a regular visitor, filling a 3,000-seat amphitheatre on Tommyfield in 1869. Formerly criticised for its lack of a cinema, there are plans to develop an "Oldham West End".

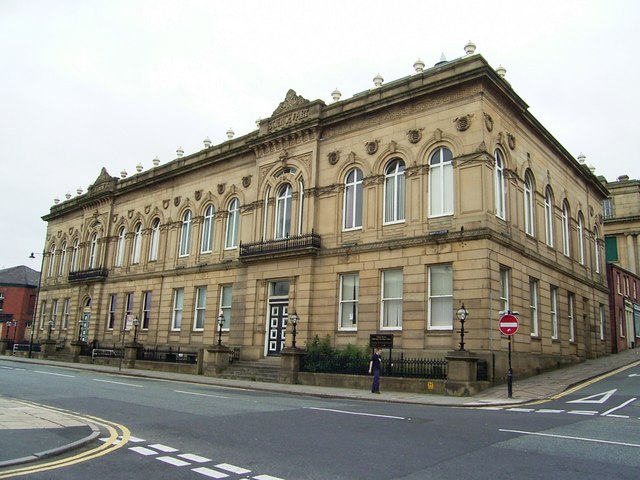
The Lyceum is a Grade II listed building opened in 1856 as a "mutual improvement" centre for the working men of Oldham.

The Lyceum is a Grade II listed building opened in 1856 at a cost of £6,500 as a "mutual improvement" centre for the working men of Oldham. The facilities provided to members included a library, a newsroom and a series of lectures on geology, geography and education, microscopy and chemistry, female education and botany. Instrumental music was introduced and there were soon sixteen violinists and three cellists. Eventually the building was extended to include a school of science and art. Music had always been important in the life of the Lyceum, and in 1892 a school of music was opened, with 39 students enrolled for the "theory and practice of music".

The Lyceum continued throughout the 20th century as a centre for the arts in Oldham. The Lyceum Players are a current amateur theatre company entering its 93rd year. They put on a varied programme of productions each season and the theatre is on the ground floor of the Lyceum building. In 1986 the local authority was invited by its directors and trustees to accept the building as a gift. The acceptance of the Lyceum building by the Education Committee provided the opportunity to move the music centre and "further enhance the cultural activities of the town". In 1989 the Oldham Metropolitan Borough Music Centre moved into the Lyceum building, which is now the home of the Oldham Lyceum School of Music.

Oldham's museum and gallery service dates back to 1883. Since then it has established itself as a cultural focus for Oldham and has developed one of the largest and most varied permanent collections in North West England. The current collection includes over 12,000 social and industrial history items, more than 2,000 works of art, about 1,000 items of decorative art, more than 80,000 natural history specimens, over 1,000 geological specimens, about 3,000 archaeological artefacts, 15,000 photographs and a large number of books, pamphlets and documents. Meanwhile, the Rifle Street drill hall dates back to 1897.

Oldham is now home to a newly built state-of-the-art art gallery, Gallery Oldham, which was completed in February 2002 as the first phase of the Oldham Cultural Quarter. Later phases of the development saw the opening of an extended Oldham Library, a lifelong learning centre and there are plans to include a performing arts centre.

=== Carnival ===
The annual Oldham Carnival started around 1900, although the tradition of carnivals in the town goes back much further, providing a "welcomed respite from the tedium of everyday life". The carnival parade was always held in mid-to-late summer, with the primary aim of raising money for charities. It often featured local dignitaries or popular entertainers, in addition to brass, military and jazz bands, the Carnival Queen, people in fancy dress, dancers and decorated floats from local churches and businesses. Whenever possible, local people who had attained national celebrity status were invited to join the cavalcade. The carnival's route began in the town centre, wound its way along King Street, and ended with a party in Alexandra Park.

The carnival fell out of favour in the late 1990s but was resurrected by community volunteers in 2006 and rebranded the Peoples' Carnival. The parade was moved into Alexandra Park in 2011. The event hosts live stages and other activities alongside a parade in the park. 2016 marked ten years since the carnival was reinstated by volunteers. The main organiser is Paul Davies who runs the carnival with a number of committee members and volunteers.

== International relations ==
Oldham is twinned with:

- (Germany) Geesthacht, Schleswig-Holstein
- Kranj, Upper Carniola, Slovenia

== Britain in Bloom ==
Oldham has had a pattern of success in the "best city" category in the national Britain in Bloom competition, winning in 2012 and 2014, and in several following years and gaining a gold award in 2019.

Oldham Council financially support the awards, one of only five local authorities in the North West to do so.

== Notable people ==
People from Oldham are called Oldhamers, though "Roughyed" is a nickname from the 18th century when rough felt was used in Oldham to make hats. Edward Potts was a renowned architect who moved to Oldham from Bury. He was the architect for fourteen mills in the Oldham area. Other notable persons with Oldham connections include composer Sir William Walton, former British prime minister Sir Winston Churchill, artist Brian Clarke, and Louise Brown, the world's first baby to be conceived by in vitro fertilisation.

Notable media personalities from Oldham include Gold Logie award-winning television game show host Tony Barber, radio announcer, singer and media personality, presenter Nick Grimshaw, actors Eric Sykes, Bernard Cribbins, Christopher Biggins and Ricky Whittle, TV host Phillip Schofield, actresses Shobna Gulati, Dora Bryan, Anne Kirkbride, Olivia Cooke, Sarah Lancashire, Barbara Knox, Siobhan Finneran and Cora Kirk, science educator Brian Cox, television presenter John Stapleton and comedy double act Cannon and Ball.

Notable musicians from Oldham include the Inspiral Carpets, N-Trance and Mark Owen of boyband Take That as well as the founding members of the rock band Barclay James Harvest.

Notable charity mountaineer, the first British Muslim to climb Mount Everest, Akke Rahman, of Bengali heritage, is from Oldham.

== See also ==
- Listed buildings in Oldham
- Greenhill power station
- Chadderton power station
