= Trolleybuses in Oldham =

Oldham trolleybus system
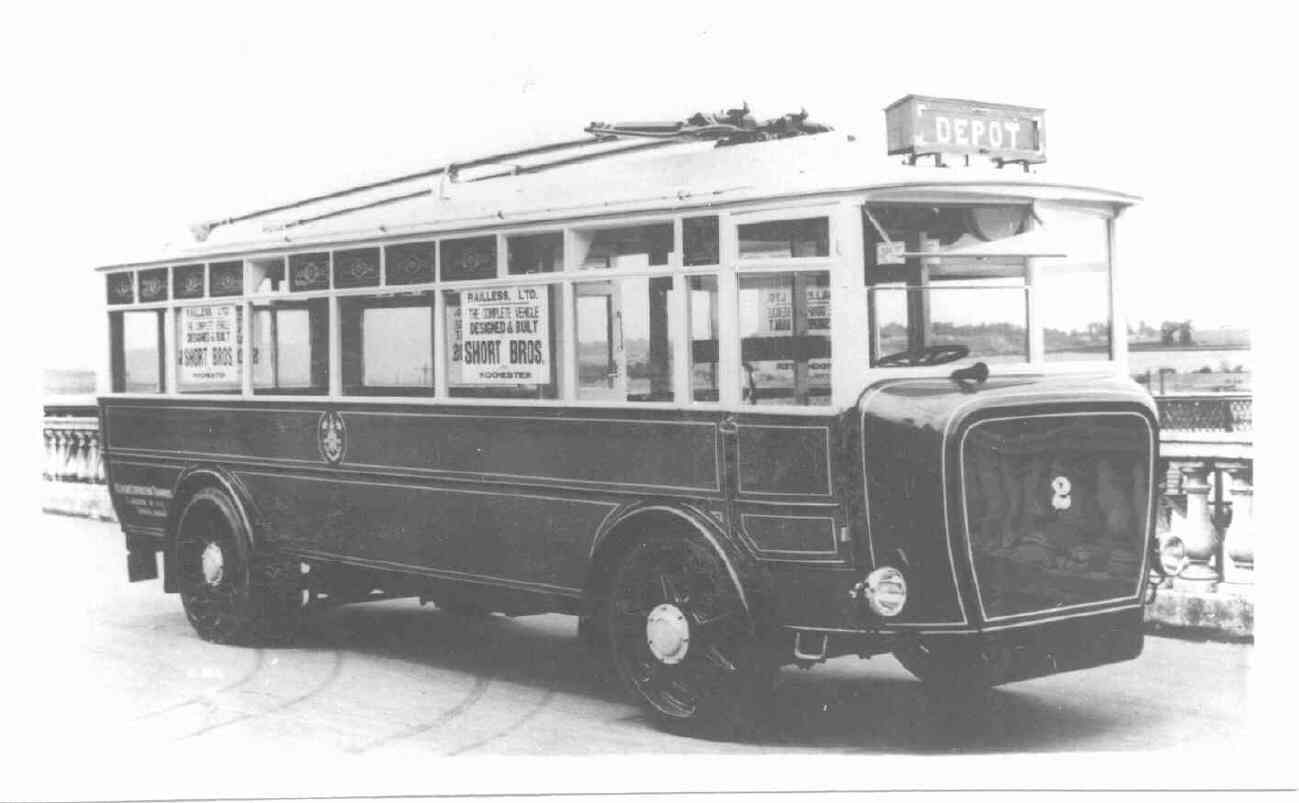
- Oldham trolleybus no. 2, 1925.

Operation
- Locale: Oldham, Lancashire (now Greater Manchester), England
- Open: 26 August 1925
- Close: 3 September 1926
- Status: Closed
- Routes: 1
- Operator: Oldham Corporation

Infrastructure
- Stock: 2 (maximum)

The Oldham trolleybus system once served the town of Oldham, then in Lancashire, but now in Greater Manchester, England.

== History ==
Opened on 26 August 1925, the Oldham system replaced the Oldham portion of the tramway between Ashton-under-Lyne and Oldham, which was jointly operated by the Ashton and Olham Corporations.

When Ashton Corporation decided to replace the trams on its share of this tramway with trolleybuses, it asked Oldham Corporation to do the same. Oldham Corporation agreed, and acquired two trolleybuses, being Oldham's share of a combined order for ten.

The Oldham trolleybus system was closed on 3 September 1926, after just over one year in operation, and was replaced by motor buses. However, the Ashton Corporation continued to run trolleybuses on its section of the route for much longer.

== Services ==
By the standards of the various now defunct trolleybus systems in the United Kingdom, the Oldham system was very small, with only one route.

== Fleet ==
The system had a maximum fleet of only two Short-bodied Railless trolleybuses.

Neither of the former Oldham trolleybuses is recorded as having survived.

== See also ==
- History of Oldham
- Transport in Oldham
- Trolleybuses in Ashton-under-Lyne
- List of trolleybus systems in the United Kingdom
