= Waterhead, Greater Manchester =

Area of Oldham, England

Coordinates: 53.5472°N 2.0852°W

Waterhead
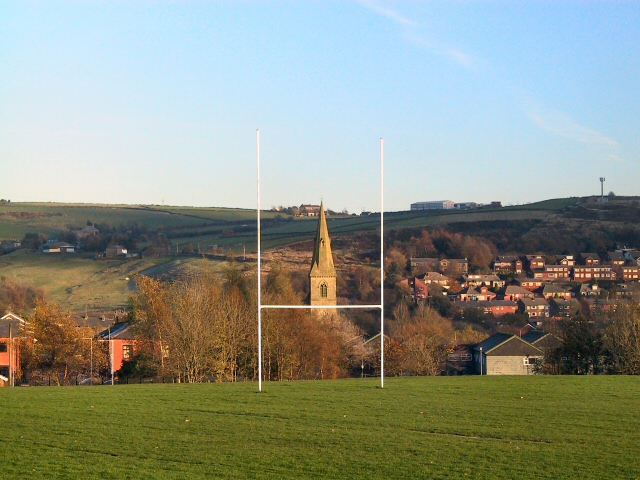
- View from Waterhead park across the rugby pitch towards Austerlands

- Location within Greater Manchester
- Population: 12,029 (2011 Census)
  - Density: 52.4
- OS grid reference: SD943056
- Metropolitan borough: Oldham
- Metropolitan county: Greater Manchester
- Region: North West
- Country: England
- Sovereign state: United Kingdom
- Post town: OLDHAM
- Postcode district: OL4
- Dialling code: 0161
- Police: Greater Manchester
- Fire: Greater Manchester
- Ambulance: North West
- UK Parliament: Oldham East and Saddleworth

Waterhead (or archaically, Waterhead Mill), is an area of Oldham, and an electoral ward of the Metropolitan Borough of Oldham, in Greater Manchester, England. Historically in Lancashire, an upland area in the Pennines, the ward of Waterhead has population of 12,876, decreasing to 12,029 at the 2011 Census.

Waterhead once formed an ecclesiastical parish in Prestwich-cum-Oldham, in the Salfordshire hundred of Lancashire. Waterhead also formed a significant part of the Oldham Above Town registration district.

Following a building boom during the Industrial Revolution, Waterhead became a densely populated industrial district dominated by cotton mills, such as Majestic Mill (pictured), owned by the Lancashire Cotton Corporation.

Waterhead was the site of considerable industry and commerce, including coal mining and cotton spinning. Following a building boom associated with the Industrial Revolution, Waterhead became a densely populated industrial district dominated by cotton mills. In 2005, Waterhead was described as still "dominated by early 20th century mills". Cairo Mill was used by the Ferranti company for many years.

Waterhead is next to parts of Greenacres, Salem, Moorside and Lees, and Austerlands and Scouthead from the west side of Saddleworth. The main A62 road from Oldham to Huddersfield passes through the locality.

Waterhead is the terminus for First Greater Manchester's 81, 81A and 82 services to Manchester via Oldham. The area is served by First's 350 service between Oldham and Ashton, First's 410 and 411 east Oldham circular services and Checkmate's 418 service between Austerlands and Chadderton.

== Notable people ==
The Rev. Charles E. Shaw was a botanist (renowned for finding plants on rubbish dumps) and also a Church of England clergyman. After serving in various other parishes, he became vicar of Waterhead in 1957; he remained vicar until 1994 and is commemorated by a memorial window in the church. A song about him called "The' Parson o' Waterhead" was written about him by Harvey Kershaw of Rochdale.

Leeds captain Kevin Sinfield played his amateur rugby for Waterhead ARLFC.
