= Greenacres, Greater Manchester =

Coordinates: 53.546315°N 2.082259°W

Greenacres
- Location within Greater Manchester
- OS grid reference: SD945055
- Metropolitan borough: Oldham
- Metropolitan county: Greater Manchester
- Region: North West
- Country: England
- Sovereign state: United Kingdom
- Post town: OLDHAM
- Postcode district: OL4
- Dialling code: 0161
- Police: Greater Manchester
- Fire: Greater Manchester
- Ambulance: North West
- UK Parliament: Oldham East and Saddleworth

Greenacres /ɡriːnˈeɪkəz/, archaically Greenacres Moor, is an area of Oldham, in Greater Manchester, England. It lies on the west side of the River Medlock opposite the village of Lees.

An upland area, rising gently in altitude from west to east, Greenacres is a residential area located next to parts of Clarksfield, Waterhead, Mumps and Derker, all in the east of Oldham.

== History ==
Until 1807, Greenacres had been open moorland, but the area was urbanised with cotton mills and densely packed redbrick terraced houses as part of Oldham's rapid industrialisation in the 19th century. The main road from Oldham to Huddersfield passes through the locality, which also facilitated this urbanisation.

Greenacres Cemetery is one of Oldham's largest municipal cemeteries; the land was purchased by Oldham Municipal Borough Council in 1850 and it opened in 1857. It has allotments for both Church of England and Roman Catholic observants.

Greenacres has also long been the site of a Nonconformist congregation. Greenacres Congregational Church was formed in 1672 and the first minister was Rev Robert Constantine

Asa Lees & Co. were cotton-spinning machinery manufacturers who had their base at Greenacres.

Greenacres was once the site of shallow coal measures. It also formed a significant part of the Oldham Above Town registration district.

=== Nonconformism ===
Greenacres has long been the site of a Nonconformist chapel and congregation. Greenacres Congregational Church has a history which spans virtually the whole period of non-conformity in the United Kingdom.

Reverend Robert Constantine, the Minister of Oldham Parish Church was ejected from his church and livings in 1662 by the Act of Uniformity 1662 for not subscribing to a nationalised system of Protestant beliefs and practices. In 1672 he began preaching to the people of Greenacres in a thatched cottage. After a short time they moved to a larger building nearby, and in 1699 yet again. In the 1780s, as the cause flourished, it became evident that those premises were inadequate and a decision was made to erect a larger and better Chapel suited to the requirements of the congregation and the surrounding community. This building, which still exists today, was built in 1794 opened in 1785.

== Education ==
Greenacres is the site of Greenacres Primary School. St. Anne's RC Primary School is also situated here. Both of these schools sit on Greenacres Road and are opposite one another.
