= Oldham Below Town =

Coordinates: 53°30′N 2°06′W

Oldham Below Town was, from 1851 until 1905, a statistical unit used for the gathering and organising of civil registration information, and output of census information. It was a sub-district of the larger registration district of Oldham, in the then registration county of Lancashire, England.

Unlike a neighbouring subdistrict of Oldham Above Town, the area was broadly urban and encompassed several residential districts south and west of central Oldham including Westwood.

In 1905 the Below Town and Above Town subdistricts were replaced by Oldham Central, Oldham East and Oldham South.

Oldham Below Town appears on several England and Wales census transcripts/returns as a place of birth and dwelling for many people of Oldham.

== See also ==
- Districts of England
- United Kingdom Census 1851
- Prestwich-cum-Oldham
