= Crossbank =

Coordinates: 53.548365°N 2.0685632°W

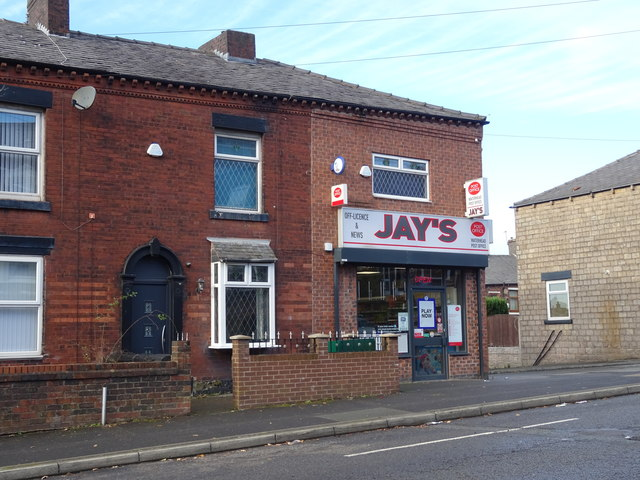
- Post Office on Stamford Road

- Location within Greater Manchester
- OS grid reference: SD 95555 05750
- Metropolitan borough: Oldham
- Metropolitan county: Greater Manchester
- Region: North West
- Country: England
- Sovereign state: United Kingdom
- Post town: OLDHAM
- Postcode district: OL4
- Dialling code: 0161
- Police: Greater Manchester
- Fire: Greater Manchester
- Ambulance: North West
- UK Parliament: Oldham East and Saddleworth

Crossbank is an area of Lees, a village in the Oldham district, in the county of Greater Manchester, England.

== History ==
Historically a part of Lancashire, the name Crossbank is thought to derive from the days of the Knights Templar when a cross was etched into an earthen bank to denote lands granted to them.

Prior to 1894, Crossbank had formed a hamlet in the parish of Ashton-under-Lyne, and lying within the Oldham parliamentary borough. Following the Local Government Act 1894, on 31 December Crossbank constituted one of seven civil parishes within the Limehurst Rural District and administrative county of Lancashire. Unlike the other six parishes, Crossbank was an exclave of Limehurst lying to the north, bordering Lees and Waterhead in Oldham. On 1 April 1914, owing to urbanisation, the civil parish was abolished and merged with Lees and became part of Lees Urban District. In 1911 the parish had a population of 1268.
