= Lees Urban District =

Former local government area in the UK

Coordinates: 53°32′N 2°04′W

Lees
- History
  - Created: 1894
  - Abolished: 1974
  - Succeeded by: Metropolitan Borough of Oldham
- Status: Urban district

Lees (or Lees Urban District) was from 1894 to 1974, a local government district in the administrative county of Lancashire, England.

It was created an urban district in 1894 by the Local Government Act 1894 and included the civil parish of Lees and part of the Crossbank hamlet. It was an exclave of the administrative county of Lancaster, being bordered to the west by the county borough of Oldham, and to the east by the West Riding of Yorkshire.

In 1974 Lees Urban District was abolished by the Local Government Act 1972 and its former area transferred to Greater Manchester to form part of the Metropolitan Borough of Oldham.
