= Roger de Montbegon =

Magna Carta Surety Baron

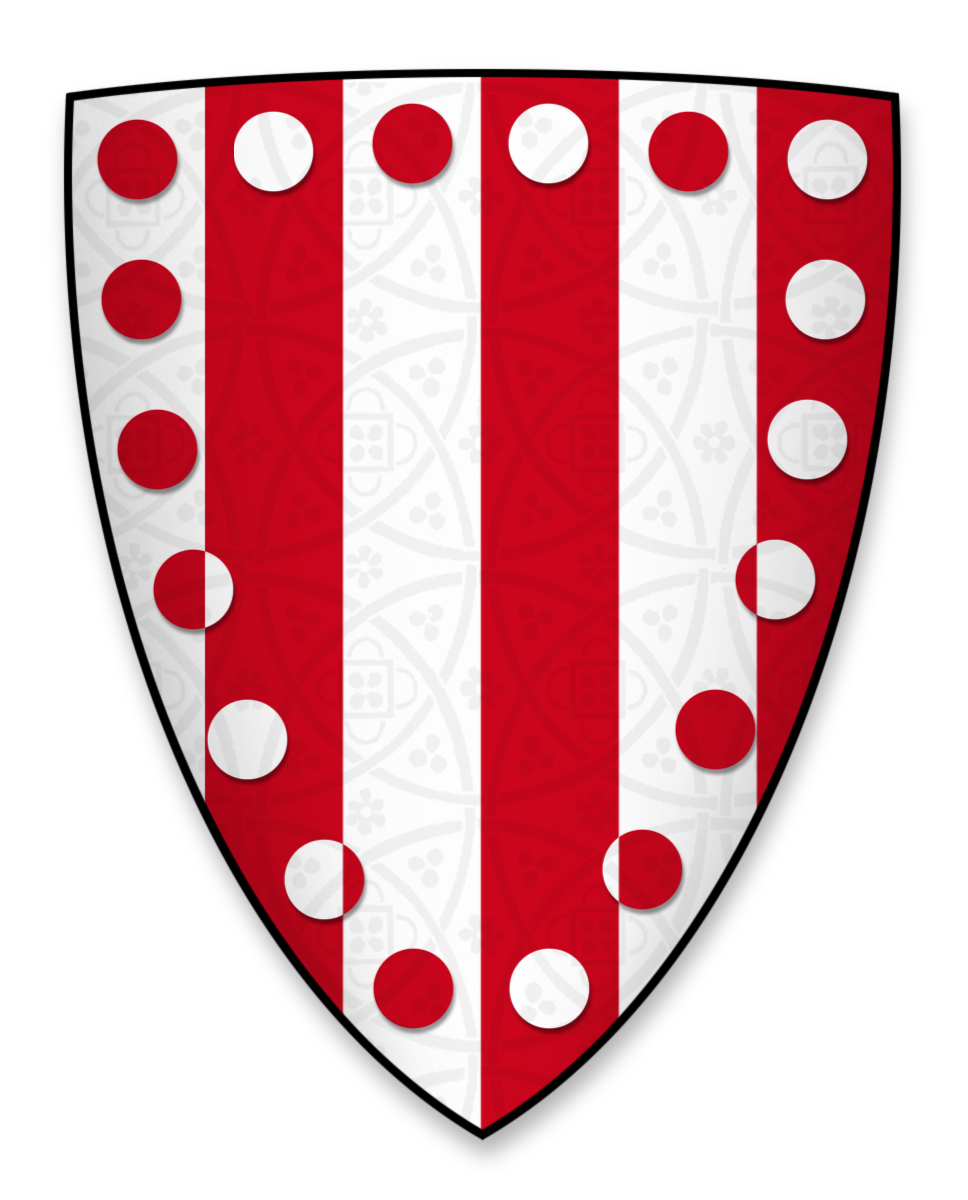
Arms of Roger de Montbegon, Lord of Hornby Castle

Roger de Montbegon (Roger de Mumbezon, Roger de Mont Begon) (died 1226) was a landowner in northern England (especially or particularly Lancashire), baron of Hornby, and one of the sureties of Magna Carta.

Though Matthew Paris does not list him among his list of the sureties, several scholars have concluded that he appears there under the erroneous name of 'Roger de Mowbray'.
