= Oldham Above Town =

Registration sub-district in the United Kingdom

Coordinates: 53°30′N 2°06′W

Oldham Above Town was, from 1851 until 1905, a statistical unit used for the gathering and organising of civil registration information, and output of census information. It was a sub-district of the larger registration district of Oldham, in the then registration county of Lancashire, in England.

Unlike neighbouring Oldham Below Town, the area was broadly rural and encompassed a number of small settlements and hamlets in the Pennine hills and moorland, north east of Oldham town centre. The district stretched from parts of Mumps, through Greenacres to Lees, including the areas of Salem, Waterhead, New Bank, Watersheddings, and part of what is now considered Lees.

In 1905 the Above Town and Below Town subdistricts were replaced by Oldham Central, Oldham East and Oldham South.

Oldham Above Town appears on several England and Wales census transcripts/returns as a place of birth and dwelling for many people of Oldham.

== See also ==
- Districts of England
- United Kingdom Census 1851
- Prestwich-cum-Oldham
