= Royton Urban District =

Former local government area in the UK

Coordinates: 53°36′N 2°06′W

Royton
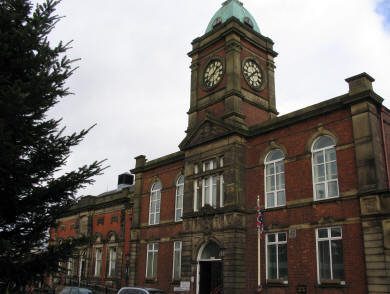
- Royton Town Hall
- Area
  - 1911: 2,147 acres (8.69 km^{2})
  - 1961: 2,148 acres (8.69 km^{2})
- Population
  - 1901: 14,811
  - 1931: 16,689
  - 1971: 20,394
- History
  - Created: 1863
  - Abolished: 1974
  - Succeeded by: Metropolitan Borough of Oldham
- Status: Local Government District 1863–1894; Urban district 1894–1974
  - HQ: Royton Town Hall

Royton was a local government district from 1863 to 1974 in Lancashire, England, which covered the modern-day town of Royton, and its suburbs and districts.

It covered a significant area to the north-west of the County Borough of Oldham, and formed part of the Oldham parliamentary constituency, which was abolished in 1950.

== History ==
The township of Royton historically lay in the large parish of Prestwich-cum-Oldham. In 1863, Royton Local Government District was created when the township adopted the Local Government Act 1858. A local board was formed to govern the town. In 1879, the district was enlarged by the addition of part of Thornham township. The Local Government Act 1894 reconstituted the area as an urban district, and Royton Urban District Council replaced the local board. The urban district was divided into five wards: Dogford, Dryclough, Haggate, Heyside, and Thornham, with each ward returning three councillors to the fifteen-member council. The only change to boundaries was in 1933, when the Lancashire (Manchester and District) Review Order added a small area from the neighbouring Municipal Borough of Middleton.

In 1974 Royton Urban District was abolished by the Local Government Act 1972 and its former area transferred to Greater Manchester to form part of the Metropolitan Borough of Oldham.
