= Royton Cricket Club =

English cricket team

Royton Cricket Club
League	Greater Manchester Cricket League
Ground	Royton Park, Royton, Greater Manchester
Professional	Amar Ullah
CLL History	1892–2015
Honours	First Division: 2 times Wood Cup: Never; Second Division: 3 times Burton Cup: 3 times (shared once)

Royton Cricket Club are an English cricket team, based in Royton in the Metropolitan Borough of Oldham, Greater Manchester. The team participated in the Central Lancashire League until the league was disbanded after the 2015 season. They now play in the Greater Manchester Cricket League, which started in 2016.

== Honours ==
First Division: 1914, 1980
Second Division: 1934, 1953, 1957
Burton Cup: 1972, 1973 (shared), 1979
Wood Cup: Finalist on ten occasions, but never won it
Derek Kay Cup: Runners Up 2019, Winners 2025

Matt England: 5 Wickets v Ashton CC (Under 15s)
