= County Borough of Oldham =

Local government district in northwest England

Coordinates: 53°30′N 2°06′W

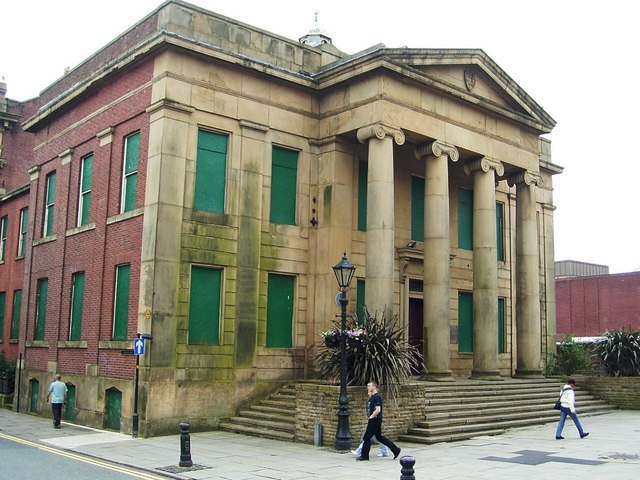
- Old Town Hall, Oldham
- Area
  - 1911: 4,736 acres (19.2 km^{2})
  - 1961: 6,392 acres (25.9 km^{2})
- Population
  - 1911: 137,246
  - 1971: 105,922
- History
  - Created: 1889
  - Abolished: 1974
  - Succeeded by: Metropolitan Borough of Oldham
- Status: County borough
- Government
  - HQ: Old Town Hall
  - Motto: Sapere aude (Dare to know)
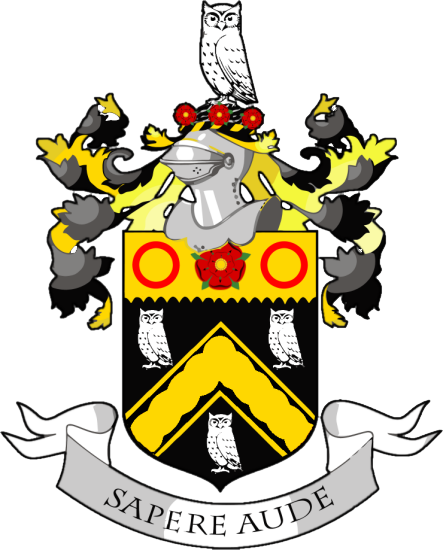

Oldham was, from 1849 to 1974, a local government district in the northwest of England coterminous with the town of Oldham.

== History ==
=== Improvement commissioners ===
Oldham Improvement Act 1826
- Act of Parliament
- Parliament of the United Kingdom
- Long title: An Act for paving, watching, fighting, cleansing and improving the Township of Oldham in the County Lancaster, and for regulating the Police thereof.
- Citation: 7 Geo. 4. c. 117

Dates
- Royal assent: 26 May 1826

Other legislation
- Repealed by: Oldham Borough Improvement Act 1865

Status: Repealed

Text of statute as originally enacted

Oldham was anciently a township in the large ecclesiastical parish of Prestwich-cum-Oldham. Prior to the 19th century the government of the town was divided between the parish vestry and the county magistrates of Lancashire. The Oldham Improvement Act 1826 (7 Geo. 4. c. cxvii) established a board of improvement commissioners. All landowners owning property worth more than £50 a year or paying an annual rent of £30 were entitled to become a commissioner. In 1848 there were 360 commissioners.

=== Municipal borough ===
Oldham Borough Improvement Act 1865
- Act of Parliament
- Parliament of the United Kingdom
- Long title: An Act for defining and extending the Powers of the Corporation of Oldham in relation to the Improvement of Streets in the Borough, and to Police and other Matters of local Government, and to Gas and Water Supply; and for other Purposes.
- Citation: 28 & 29 Vict. c. cccxi

Dates
- Royal assent: 5 July 1865

Text of statute as originally enacted

In December 1848 the inhabitant householders of the parliamentary borough of Oldham petitioned the Privy council for a charter of incorporation under the Municipal Corporations Act 1835. The charter was granted on 13 June 1849, and the Municipal Borough of Oldham came into existence on 1 November.

=== County borough ===
Under the Local Government Act 1888 all municipal boroughs with a population of 50,000 or more were designated as "county boroughs" with the powers of both a municipal borough and a county council. In 1889, therefore, the town became the County Borough of Oldham. Although independent of Lancashire County Council, Oldham remained part of the county for certain purposes such as lieutenancy, shrievalty, custos rotulorum and administration of justice. Soon after establishment, the corporation of the county borough promoted a parliamentary bill to extend its boundaries to include four neighbouring local government districts: Chadderton to the west, Crompton to the north, Lees to the east and Royton to the north west. The bill was unsuccessful, and there were only minor boundary adjustments to the borough until the 1950s, while the four surrounding towns became urban districts in their own right in 1894. Despite this, in 1926 and 1931, two Oldham Extension Bills for the County Borough of Oldham to amalgamate with Chadderton Urban District were proposed, but rejected by the House of Lords following objections from neighbouring councils. In 1947 the Local Government Boundary Commission recommended that due to the lack of land for the borough's housing programme that its boundaries should be substantially extended. This was not carried out, but in 1951 the borough was enlarged to take in 605 acres (2.45 km^{2}) from Limehurst Rural District, and three years later a further 1,052 acres (4.26 km^{2}) were added when the rural district was abolished.

The County Borough of Oldham was abolished by the Local Government Act 1972 and its territory transferred to Greater Manchester to form a part of the Metropolitan Borough of Oldham.

== Corporation and council ==
The charter of 1849 divided the borough into eight wards, with each ward represented by three councillors and one alderman, creating a town council of thirty-two members. Councillors had a three-year term of office, with one councillor being elected in each ward annually. Aldermen had a six-year term, with half of their number being elected by the council every three years. The council elected a mayor from their membership to head the council at their annual meeting. In 1886 the number of wards was increased to twelve: Clarksfield, Coldhurst, Hartford, Hollinwood, Mumps, St James, St Mary's, St Paul's, St Peter's, Waterhead, Werneth, and Westwood. The size of the council was accordingly increased to forty-eight. In 1954 the borough was enlarged and in the following year a thirteenth ward of Bardsley was formed, and the council increased to fifty-two members.

=== Political control ===
By the 1880s groups aligned with the parliamentary Conservative and Liberal parties contested elections to the borough council. The Liberals (or Radicals) had a majority until 1903, when Conservatives gained control. The elections were fought on Home Rule issues for some years in the early years of the 20th century, with Conservatives supporting Unionism, while Liberals were supported by Roman Catholic organisations. Liberals were in a majority again following World War I, while Labour councillors began to appear on the council. From 1927 the Conservatives and Liberals combined to oppose Labour. In 1931 Conservatives took control, with Labour forming the opposition. In 1934 Labour first took power, and for the next nineteen years the two parties alternated as the majority party. From 1953 to 1968 Labour held the borough, the Conservatives were in power from 1968 to 1971 with Labour regaining control for the last three years of the council's existence.

== Coat of arms ==
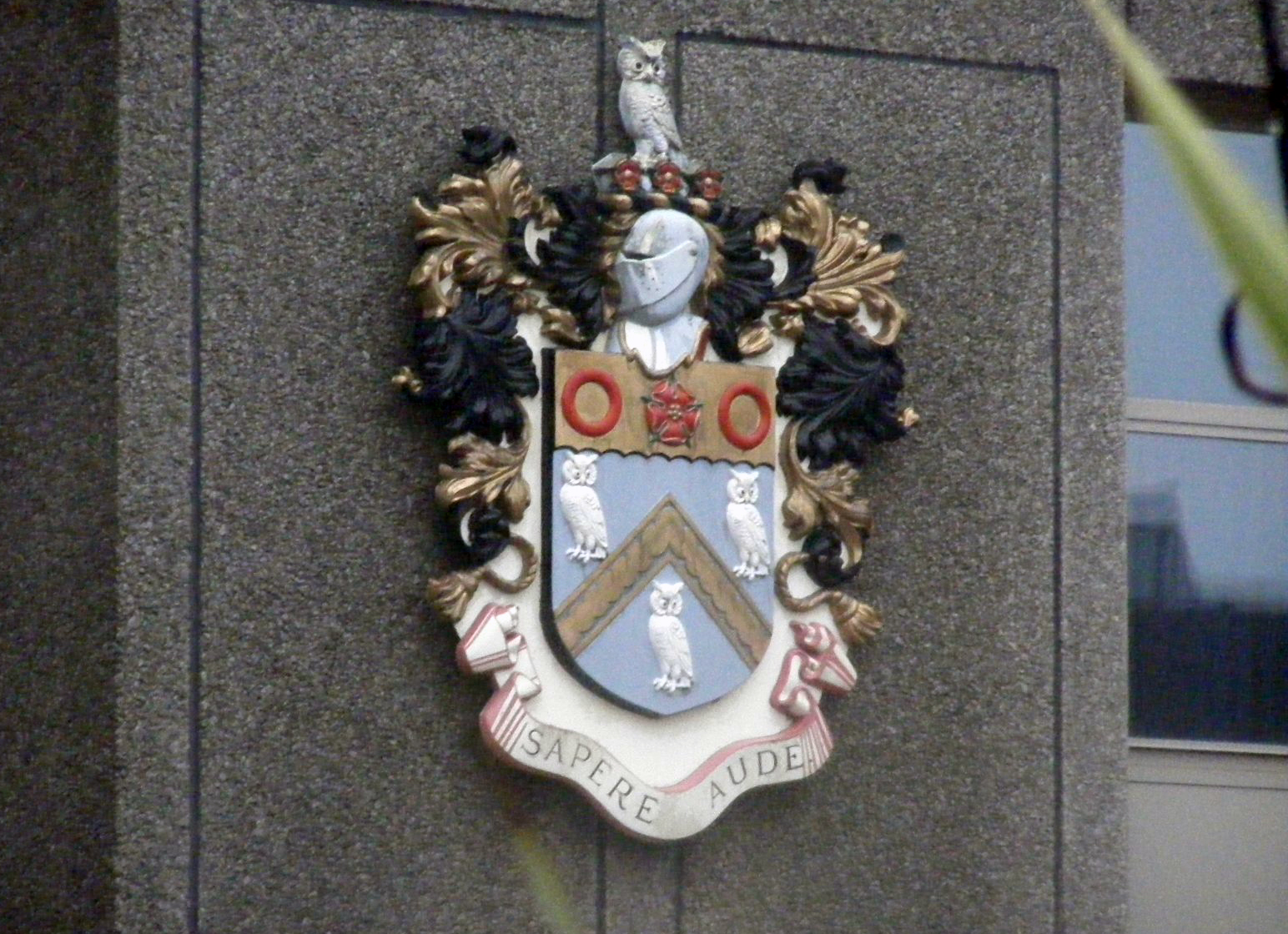
The Coat of Arms of the Oldham County Borough Council, as found at Oldham Police Station. The station predates the merging of Oldham Borough Police into Lancashire Constabulary in 1969, and thus still displays the redundant arms.

Prior to 1894, the town council made use of the arms of the Oldham family. The arms were blazoned as:

Sable a chevron Or between three owls argent on a chief of the second as many roses gules.

The owls suggest that the family, like the town, called itself 'Owdham', and adopted the birds in allusion to its name. It is possible that the family set the Red Rose of Lancaster on their shield to denote their Lancastrian sympathies. The most famous member of the family to use the arms was Hugh Oldham, Bishop of Exeter, who died in 1519. The arms form part of the insignia of Corpus Christi College, Oxford, founded by the bishop.

The use of the family arms by the corporation was improper, and on 8 November 1894 they received letters patent from the Kings of Arms granting armorial bearings. The arms were based on the family arms, with necessary heraldic differences introduced to the design. The blazon was as follows:

Sable a chevron invected plain cottised Or between three owls argent on a chief engrailed of the second a rose Gules barbed and seeded proper between two annulets also gules, and for a Crest: On a wreath of the colours in front of a rock thereon an owl argent three roses fessewise gules barbed and seeded proper.

The Latin motto adopted was Sapere Aude or "dare to be wise", and was a reference to the owls in the arms.

== Utilities ==
Oldham Gas and Water Act 1825
- Act of Parliament
- Parliament of the United Kingdom
- Long title: An Act for lighting with Gas the Town of Oldham, and the Neighbourhood thereof, within the Parish of Prestwich-cum-Oldham, in the County Palatine of Lancaster; and for the better supplying the Inhabitants of the said Town and Neighbourhood with Water.
- Citation: 6 Geo. 4. c. clxxi

Dates
- Royal assent: 22 June 1825

Text of statute as originally enacted

Oldham Corporation Gas and Water Act 1853
- Act of Parliament
- Parliament of the United Kingdom
- Long title: An Act for enabling the Mayor, Aldermen, and Burgesses of the Borough of Oldham in the County Palatine of Lancaster to purchase and maintain Gasworks and Waterworks; and for other Purposes.
- Citation: 16 & 17 Vict. c. xlii

Dates
- Royal assent: 14 June 1853

Text of statute as originally enacted

The Oldham Gas Light and Waterworks Company was incorporated by the Oldham Gas and Water Act 1825 (6 Geo. 4. c. clxxi). It built Upper Strinesdale Reservoir between 1826 and 1832.

The Oldham Gas Light and Waterworks Company was acquired by Oldham Corporation under the Oldham Corporation Gas and Water Act 1853 (16 & 17 Vict. c. xlii).

=== Water ===
Shortly after Oldham Corporation Waterworks was created, it started construction of Piethorne Reservoir.
