= Royton =

Town in Greater Manchester, England

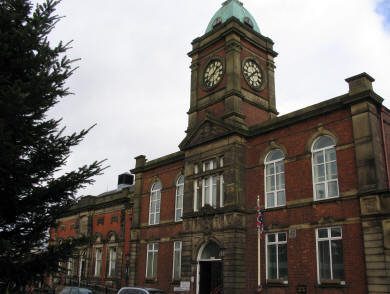
- Royton Town Hall

- Location within Greater Manchester
- Population: 21,284 (2011 Census)
- OS grid reference: SD919078
  - London: 165 mi (266 km) SSE
- Metropolitan borough: Oldham
- Metropolitan county: Greater Manchester
- Region: North West
- Country: England
- Sovereign state: United Kingdom
- Post town: OLDHAM
- Postcode district: OL2
- Dialling code: 0161, 01706
- Police: Greater Manchester
- Fire: Greater Manchester
- Ambulance: North West
- UK Parliament: Oldham West, Chadderton and Royton

Royton is a town in the Metropolitan Borough of Oldham, Greater Manchester, England, with a population of 21,284 in 2011. Close to the source of the River Irk, near undulating land at the foothills of the South Pennines, it is 2 miles (3.2 km) northwest of Oldham, 3 miles (4.8 km) southeast of Rochdale and 8 miles (12.9 km) northeast of Manchester.

Within the boundaries of the historic county of Lancashire, Royton and its surroundings have provided evidence of ancient British, Roman and Viking activity in the area. During the Middle Ages, Royton formed a small township centred on Royton Hall, a manor house owned by a long succession of dignitaries which included the Byrons and Radcliffes. A settlement expanded outwards from the hall which, by as late as 1780, "contained only a few straggling and mean-built cottages". Farming was the main industry of this rural area, with locals supplementing their incomes by hand-loom woollen weaving in the domestic system.

Royton has the distinction of being the first town where a powered cotton mill was built; at Thorp in 1764, and is one of the first localities in the world to have adopted the factory system. The introduction of textile manufacture during the Industrial Revolution facilitated a process of unplanned urbanisation in the area, and by the mid-19th century Royton had emerged as a mill town. At its zenith, there were 40 cotton mills—some of the largest in the United Kingdom—employing 80% of the local population. Imports of foreign cotton goods began the decline in Royton's textile industry during the mid-20th century, and its last mill closed in 2002.

Today, fewer than a dozen mills are still standing, the majority of which are used for light engineering or as distribution centres. Despite an economic depression brought about by the demise of cotton spinning, Royton's population has continued to grow as a result of intensive housing redevelopment which has modernised its former Edwardian districts.

== History ==
=== Toponymy ===
The name Royton is Anglo-Saxon in origin, and it has been suggested that the Rye crop is the root of the name; "Roy-" is derived from Rye, with the Old English suffix -ton added to imply "rye farm" or "rye settlement". The first known written record of the name Ryeton (or Ryton) was in a survey of Lancashire in 1212, although the name is believed to date from the 7th century as a result of Anglian colonisation which followed the Battle of Chester.

=== Early history ===
There is evidence of Stone Age human activity in the area, by way of a Neolithic stone axe found at Royton Park. The ancient Britons are thought to have inhabited the area, and the Romans to have traversed it; the remains of a Roman or Early Medieval bloomery was discovered in 1836. There is no physical manifestation of the Vikings/Norsemen in the locality, but toponymic evidence implies they have been present; the hamlet of Thorp is the oldest settled locality in Royton, and its name is of Old Norse origin meaning "farm, estate or village".

Unmentioned in the Domesday Book of 1086, Royton does not appear in records until 1212, when it was documented to have been a thegnage estate, or manor, comprising twelve oxgangs of land, with an annual rate of 24 shillings payable by the tenant, William Fitz William, to King John. From William, who died in 1223, Royton passed to his son Thomas, who was still alive in 1254. Thomas's daughter Margery, who married Alexander Luttrell of Somerset, sold the majority of Royton and its outlying land to John de Byron in around 1260. It is from this exchange that the Byron family came to use Royton as their chief place of residence until the early part of the 17th century.

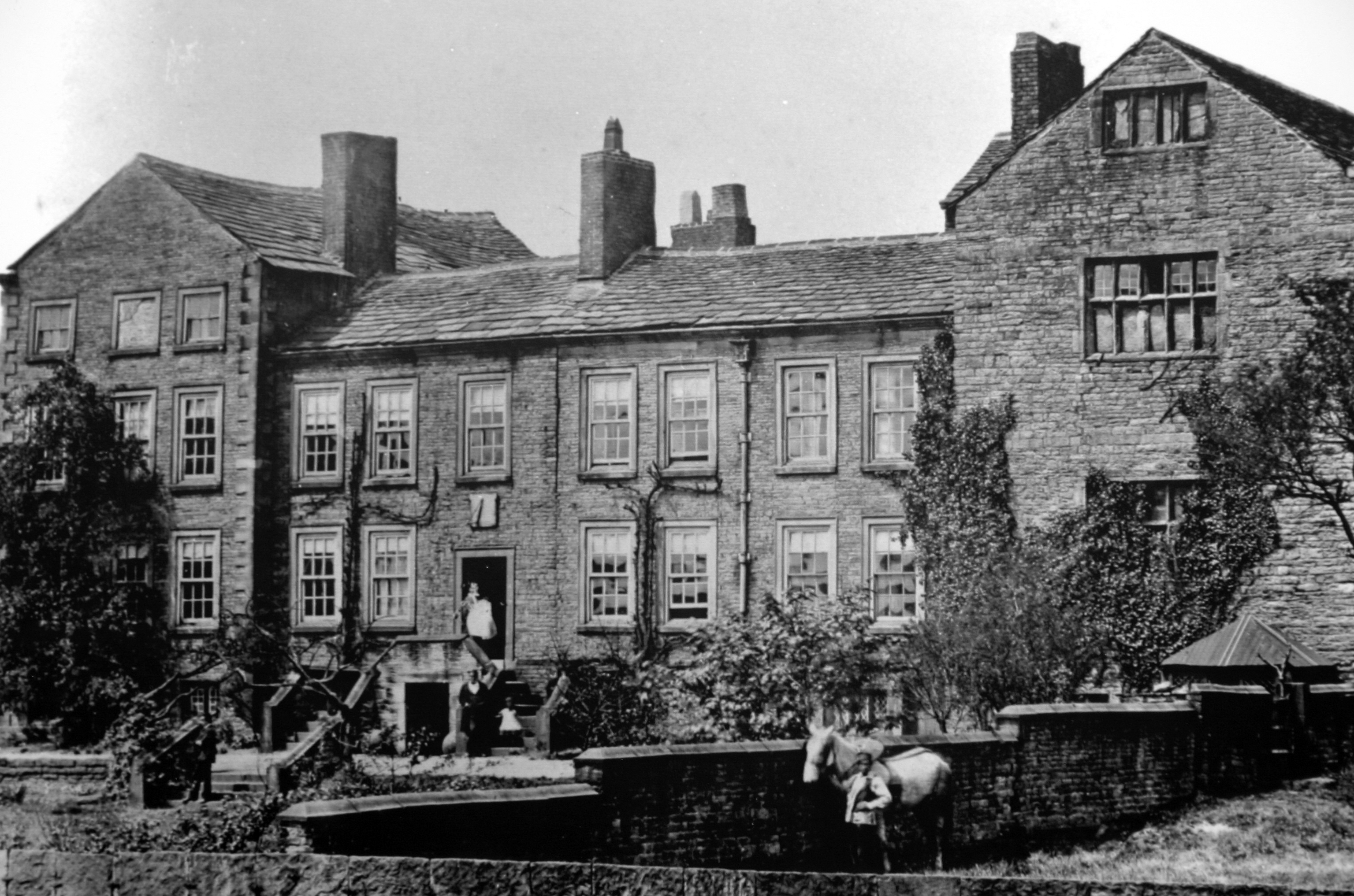
The early history of Royton is linked with Royton Hall (pictured), the township's former manor house.

The early history of Royton is linked closely with what was then its manor house, Royton Hall, which was inhabited by the Byron family for over 350 years. During that period the Byrons' involvement in regional and national affairs added prestige to what was otherwise an obscure and rural township. John de Byron was a witness to the charter of incorporation of 1301, which elevated the township of Manchester to the status of a borough.

A descendant of John—John Byron—served as High Sheriff of Lancashire in 1572, and was knighted by Elizabeth I in 1579. John served as Deputy Lieutenant of Lancashire at the time of the Spanish Armada, and sourced infantry from Royton towards the English military. His son, also called John, fought during the English Civil War on the side of the Cavaliers. His actions led to making him John Byron, 1st Baron Byron of Rochdale by way of a peerage granted by King Charles I. Following the regicide of Charles I, and the rise of Cromwellian England, Baron Byron's possessions, including his lands in Royton, were confiscated. Royton Hall was then purchased by Thomas Percival, a wealthy linen manufacturer whose descendants continued to occupy the hall until around 1814. The hall was then inherited by the Radcliffe Baronets.

=== Textiles and the Industrial Revolution ===
Apart from the dignitaries who lived in Royton Hall, the population of Royton during the Middle Ages comprised a small community of retainers and farmers, most of whom were involved with pasture, but supplemented their incomes by weaving woollens in the domestic system. The area was thinly populated and consisted of several hamlets, including Thorp, Heyside and Royton village itself as the nucleus. During the Early Modern period, the weavers of Royton had been using spinning wheels in makeshift weavers' cottages, but as both the demand for cotton goods increased and the technology of cotton-spinning machinery improved during the early-18th century, the need for larger structures to house bigger, better and more efficient equipment became apparent. The construction of a water powered cotton mill by Ralph Taylor at Thorp Clough in 1764, is said to be the first structure of its kind.

The construction of more mills followed, which initiated a process of urbanisation and socioeconomic transformation in the region; the population moved away from farming, adopting employment in the factory system. The introduction of the factory system led to a tenfold increase of Royton's population in less than a century; from 260 in 1714 to 2,719 in 1810. Despite its growth as a centre for cotton-cloth production, and the construction of a chapel of ease in 1754, in 1780 Royton was said to have "contained only a few straggling and mean-built cottages". The people of Royton continued to produce cotton goods (mainly cloth) and sell them at the market in Manchester.

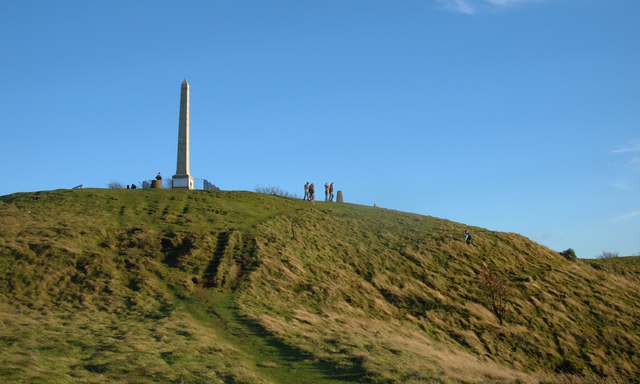
Rehearsals by Radicals at Royton's Tandle Hill (pictured) led to increased tensions surrounding the ill-fated political demonstration now known as the Peterloo massacre.

During this period of growth, Royton's parliamentary representation was limited to two members of parliament for Lancashire, and nationally, the end of the Napoleonic Wars in 1815 had resulted in periods of famine and chronic unemployment for textile weavers. By the beginning of 1819 the pressure generated by poor economic conditions, coupled with the lack of suffrage in northern England, had enhanced the appeal of political Radicalism in the region. The Manchester Patriotic Union, a group agitating for parliamentary reform, began to organise a mass public demonstration in Manchester to demand the reform of parliamentary representation. Organised preparations took place, and a spy reported that "seven hundred men drilled at Tandle Hill as well as any army regiment would"; a few days later, on 3 August, a royal proclamation forbidding the practice of drilling was posted in Manchester.

On 16 August 1819, Royton (like its neighbours) sent a contingent of its townsfolk to Manchester to join the mass political demonstration now known as the Peterloo massacre (owing to the 15 deaths and 400–700 injuries that followed). Royton's contingent was of particular note, in that it sent a sizable female section to the demonstration.

Royton's damp climate provided the ideal conditions for cotton spinning to be carried out without the cotton drying and breaking, and newly developed 19th century mechanisation optimised cotton spinning for mass production for the global market. By 1832, there were 12 steam powered mills in Royton, of which its former hamlets had begun to agglomerate as a town around the cotton factories, a number of small coalpits and new turnpike road from Oldham to Rochdale, which passed through the town centre.

The Manchester, Oldham and Royton Railway and a goods yard was constructed in the 1860s, allowing improved transportation of textile goods and raw materials to and from the township. Neighbouring Oldham (which by the 1870s had emerged of the largest and most productive mill town in the world) had begun to encroach upon Royton's southern boundary, forming a continuous urban cotton-spinning district. The demand for cheap cotton goods from this area prompted the flotation of cotton spinning companies; the investment was followed by the construction of 22 new cotton mills in Royton. Together with Oldham, at its peak the area was responsible for 13% of the world's cotton production.

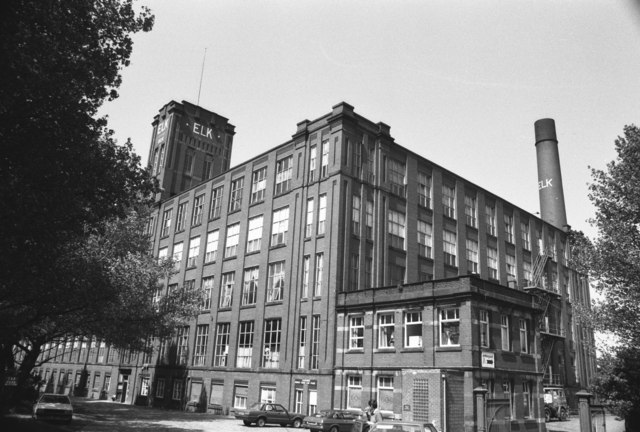
Built in 1926, Elk mill (on the Royton-Chadderton boundary) was one of the UK's largest and most modern cotton mills. It closed in 1998 and was demolished a year later.

Supplies of raw cotton from the United States were cut during the Lancashire Cotton Famine of 1861–65, leading to the formation of the Royton Local Board of Health in 1863, whose purpose was to ensure social security and maintain hygiene and sanitation in the locality.

On 26 November 1884 an explosive device containing gunpowder was detonated in Royton Town Hall, in a cellar underneath the offices of Royton's local board. An anonymous communication was received by the supposed bomber, stating that he intended the explosion for the Royton School Board because children were not allowed to work at the age of 10 years, and because he wanted the abolition of the Factory Acts. There were no fatalities caused by the explosion, and damage to the building was restricted to smoke damage and shattered windows, doors and woodwork.

The Great Depression, and First and Second World Wars each contributed to periods of economic decline in Royton. However, in as late the 1950s, 80% of Royton's population was employed in the textile mills. As imports of cheaper foreign yarns increased during the mid-20th century, Royton's textile sector declined gradually to a halt; cotton spinning reduced in the 1960s and 1970s, and by the early 1980s only four mills were operational. In spite of efforts to increase the efficiency and competitiveness of its production, the last cotton was spun in the town in 2002. Less than a dozen mills are still standing in Royton, the majority of which are now used for light engineering or as distribution centres.

=== Post-industrial history ===
Since deindustrialisation, Royton's population has continued to grow as a result of intensive housing redevelopment which has modernised much its former Edwardian terraced housing districts, and the construction of retail and business parks, which provide employment. The town has subsequently been described as "doing better than most" in Greater Manchester. Despite this, since the turn of the millennium Royton has been earmarked for cosmetic gentrification. In the 2000s, Royton was used as a filming location for the BBC One police drama Life on Mars, particularly the area near Lion Mill. Life on Mars is set in 1970s Manchester.

== Governance ==
The coat of arms of the former Royton Urban District Council.

Lying within the historic county boundaries of Lancashire since the early 12th century, Royton anciently constituted a thegnage estate, held by tenants who paid tax to the King. Royton during the Middle Ages formed a township in the parish of Prestwich-cum-Oldham, and hundred of Salford. Anciently, law and order was upheld in the locality by two constables, chosen by the community and appointed annually by Vestry meetings.

Following the Poor Law Amendment Act 1834, Royton formed part of the Oldham Poor Law Union, an inter-parish unit established to provide social security. Royton's first was a local board of health established in 1863; Royton Local Board of Health was a regulatory body responsible for standards of hygiene and sanitation in the township. In 1871 Royton was noted as a large village-chapelry, and a sub-district of the Oldham registration district. In 1879, a part of the neighbouring township of Thornham was amalgamated into the area of the local board. Following the Local Government Act 1894, the area of the Local Board became the Royton Urban District, a local government district within the administrative county of Lancashire.

The urban district council was based in Royton Town Hall, which had been purpose-built for the local board in 1880. In 1933, a part of the neighbouring Municipal Borough of Middleton was transferred to Royton Urban District. Under the Local Government Act 1972, the Royton Urban District was abolished, and Royton has, since 1 April 1974, formed an unparished area of the Metropolitan Borough of Oldham, a local government district of the metropolitan county of Greater Manchester. Royton has two of the twenty wards of the Metropolitan Borough of Oldham: Royton North and Royton South.

In terms of parliamentary representation, Royton after the Reform Act 1832 was represented as part of the Oldham parliamentary borough constituency, of which the first Members of Parliaments (MPs) were the radicals William Cobbett and John Fielden. Winston Churchill was the MP between 1900 and 1906. Constituency boundaries changed during the 20th century, and Royton has lain within the Royton (1918–1950), Heywood and Royton (1950–1983), and Oldham Central and Royton (1983–1997) constituencies. From 1997 to 2024, Royton lay within Oldham West and Royton and, following boundary changes, Oldham West, Chadderton and Royton since 2024. Until his death in 2015, it was represented in the House of Commons by Michael Meacher, a member of the Labour Party. Since the by-election following Meacher's death the representing MP has been Jim McMahon.

== Geography ==
At 53°33′57″N 2°7′16″W (53.566°, −2.121°) and 165 miles (266 km) north-northwest of London, Royton lies at the foothills of the Pennines, roughly 688 feet (210 m) above sea level. The larger towns of Rochdale and Oldham lie to the north and south respectively. For purposes of the Office for National Statistics, Royton forms part of the Greater Manchester Urban Area, with Manchester city centre itself 7.6 miles (12.2 km) southwest of Royton.

Described in Samuel Lewis's A Topographical Dictionary of England (1848) as being in "aspect rather wild", Royton lies in a shallow valley amongst undulating land. The sources of the rivers Irk and Beal are to the northeast and east respectively. The Irk meanders southwesterly into Chadderton, and then onwards to Middleton into Manchester before uniting its waters with the River Irwell in Manchester city centre. The general slope of the land decreases in height away from the Pennines, from east to west, but reaches high points of 509 feet (155 m) at Tandle Hill and 825 feet (251 m) at the summit of Oldham Edge, a ridge of elevated land which leads to Oldham. The soils of the town are broadly sand with subsoils of clay.

Royton's built environment follows a standard urban structure, consisting of residential dwellings centred around a High Street in the town centre, which is the local centre of commerce. There is a mixture of low-density urban areas, suburbs, semi-rural and rural locations in Royton, but overwhelmingly the land use in the town is residential. Tandle Hill is a 110-acre (45 ha) country park consisting of open grasslands and mature beech woodlands.

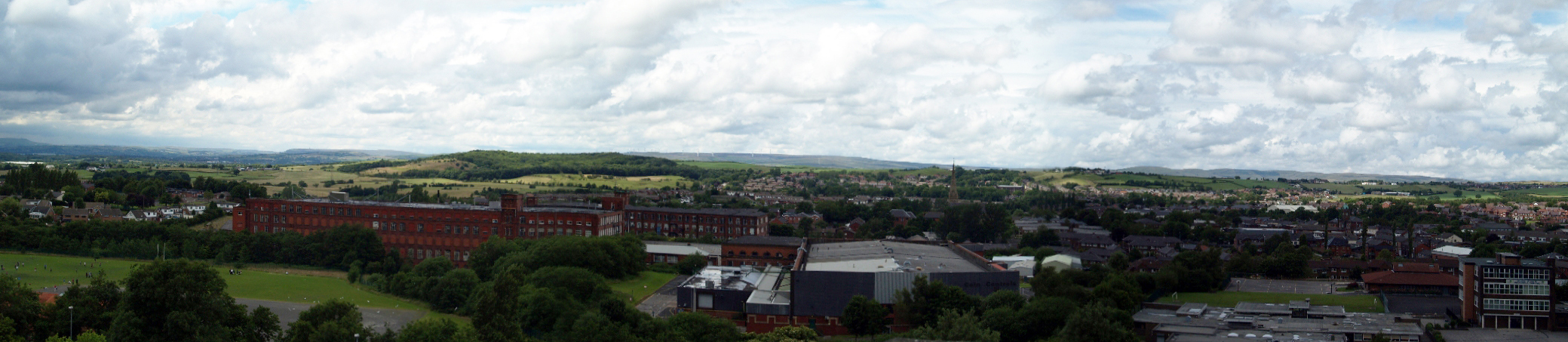
A panorama of Royton in 2008 from the Church of St Ann, Royton, looking northwards.

Suburban localities in Royton include Haggate, Heyside, Holden Fold, Long Sight (or Longsight), Oozewood, Royley, Salmon Fields, Stott Field, Thornham, and Thorp. Thornham was formerly a township in itself, but was amalgamated into Royton in the late-19th century.

== Demography ==
Royton compared
2001 UK census	Royton	Oldham (borough)	England
Total population	22,238	217,273	49,138,831
White	97.4%	86.1%	90.9%
Asian	1.1%	11.9%	4.6%
Black	0.3%	0.6%	2.3%

According to the Office for National Statistics, at the time of the United Kingdom Census 2001, Royton (urban-core and sub-area) had a total resident population of 22,238. Royton considered as a combination of the 2001 electoral wards of Royton North and Royton South, had a population of 20,961. The 2001 population density of the urban area was 11,519 inhabitants per square mile (4,448/km^{2}), with a 100 to 92.3 female-to-male ratio. Of those over 16 years old, 25.3% were single (never married) 46.8% married, and 8.4% divorced. Royton's 9,204 households included 26.1% one-person, 42.1% married couples living together, 9.3% were co-habiting couples, and 9.6% single parents with their children. Of those aged 16–74, 31.7% had no academic qualifications.

At the 2001 UK census, 84.8% of Royton's residents reported themselves as being Christian, 0.8% Muslim, 0.4% Hindu, and 0.1% Buddhist. The census recorded 7.9% as having no religion, 0.1% had an alternative religion and 5.9% did not state their religion.

Royton's population has been described as broadly working class with pockets of lower middle class communities, particularly in the southwest of the town, near the border with Chadderton, and a growing middle middle class community to the north near Tandle Hill Country Park.

Population growth in Royton since 1901
Year	1901	1911	1921	1931	1939	1951	1961	1971	1981	1991	2001	2011
Population	14,881	17,069	17,194	16,689	14,771	14,781	14,474	20,394	21,098	21,475	22,238	21,284
Urban District 1901–1971 • Urban Subdivision 1981–2001

== Economy ==
From the 18th century onwards, Royton's economy was closely tied with that of Britain's textile manufacture during the Industrial Revolution, particularly the cotton spinning sector. However, Royton also lies on the Oldham Coalfield, and coal mining had an economic role for the area in as early as the 17th century. Mining peaked in the 19th century with over 200 collieries in the town. Royton's pits were prone to repeated flooding, and owners began to close them. Coal production began to decline even before that of the local spinning industry, with the last pit closing in 1902.

Since deindustrialisation, Royton's economic activity has been focused around a 22-acre (8.9 ha) business park at Salmon Fields which includes distribution companies such as 3663 and Holroyd Meek, manufacturing firms including bed manufacturers Slumberland, and formerly included vehicle assembly at Seddon Atkinson. Formerly an area of "green fields", the Salmon Fields Business Village was proposed in 1983, and developed into a business park later that decade despite objections that the estate would ruin a "beautiful area", and cause noise pollution. There are additional retail parks in the locality, including the centre (formerly Elk Mill Retail Park), which lies at the start of the A627(M) motorway.

Opposite Royton Town Hall is a shopping precinct containing 23 shop units and a supermarket operated by Co-operative Food. The site was opened in 1971 and occupies the town's former market street, which was demolished in 1969. In 2004 a report noted that a weakness of the precinct is that it lacks a variety of shops.

== Landmarks ==
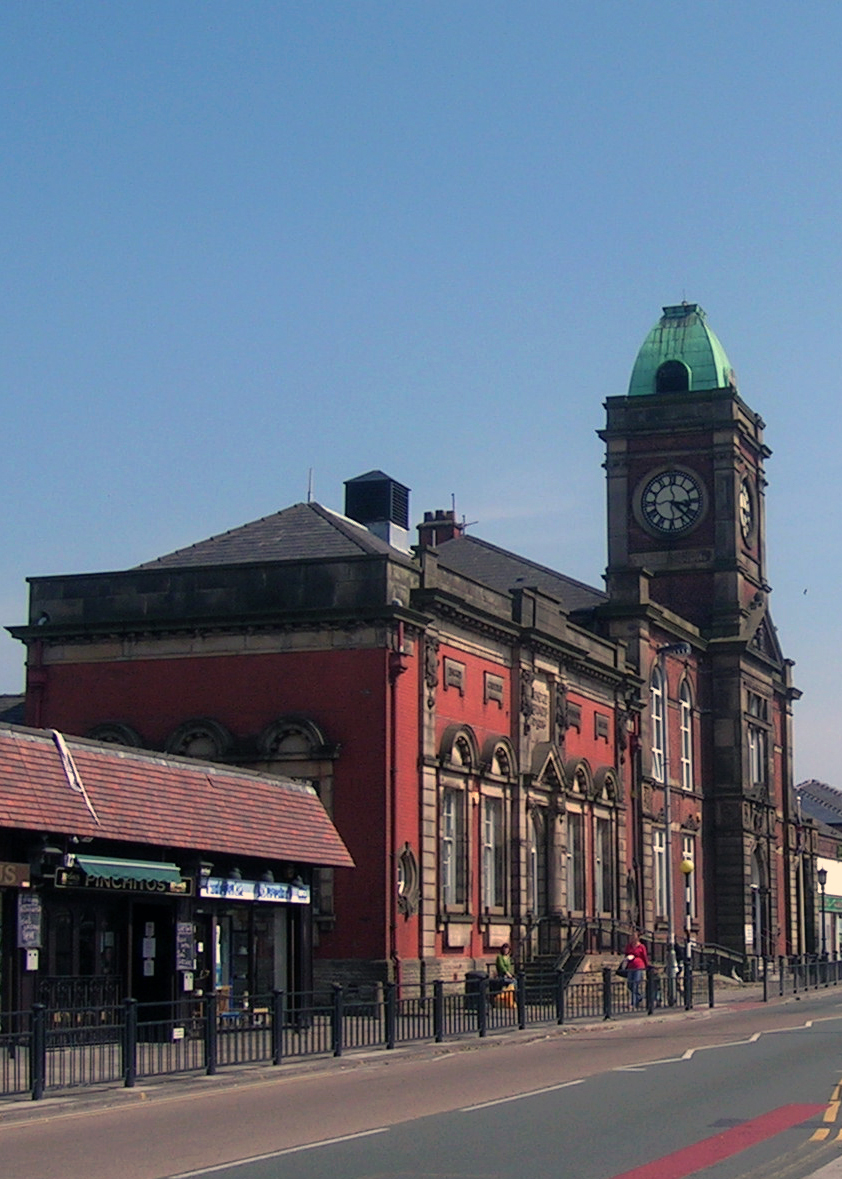
Royton Town Hall: the half-sized clock face on the eastern facade is said to have been a result of civic rivalry with neighbouring Shaw and Crompton.

Historically, Royton's only landmark was Royton Hall, the township's former manor house which was inhabited by local dignitaries from its construction (in as early as the 13th century) to 1814. Part of the hall was erected during the 16th century, but the east wing was crafted in the Elizabethan or Jacobean architectural style. In 1794 it was described as "pleasantly seated in a deep valley, surrounded by high grounds. It is a firm, well built stone edifice of ancient date".

During the First World War, Royton Hall was used to house Belgian refugees, and following the war was bought by Dr John Thomas Godfrey. After he took his family to South Africa, it stood empty until it was converted into flats. The hall fell into disrepair in the 1930s and was demolished in 1938. The foundations of the structure were excavated in 2005 leading to the discovery of original panes of glass and a Tudor stair tower.

Royton Town Hall is a purpose-built municipal building opened in September 1880, by James Ashworth, the first Chairman of Royton Local Board of Health. It was constructed in a free style of architecture, and includes a domed roof and clock tower topped by a copper cupola. By the entrance is a flagstaff which flies the Union Flag. The clock tower is inscribed on three sides with Latin mottos: "Tempus Fugit" (time flies), "Sic Labitur Aetas" (so the years pass by) and "Finem Respice" (have regards to the end). The clock face on the east side, facing Shaw and Crompton is half the size of the other three. A local tale is that when the Church of Holy Trinity at Shaw was constructed in 1869, it had no clock on the western facade of its clock tower, which faced Royton. The reduced clock face size at Royton Town Hall is said to have been a retaliation.

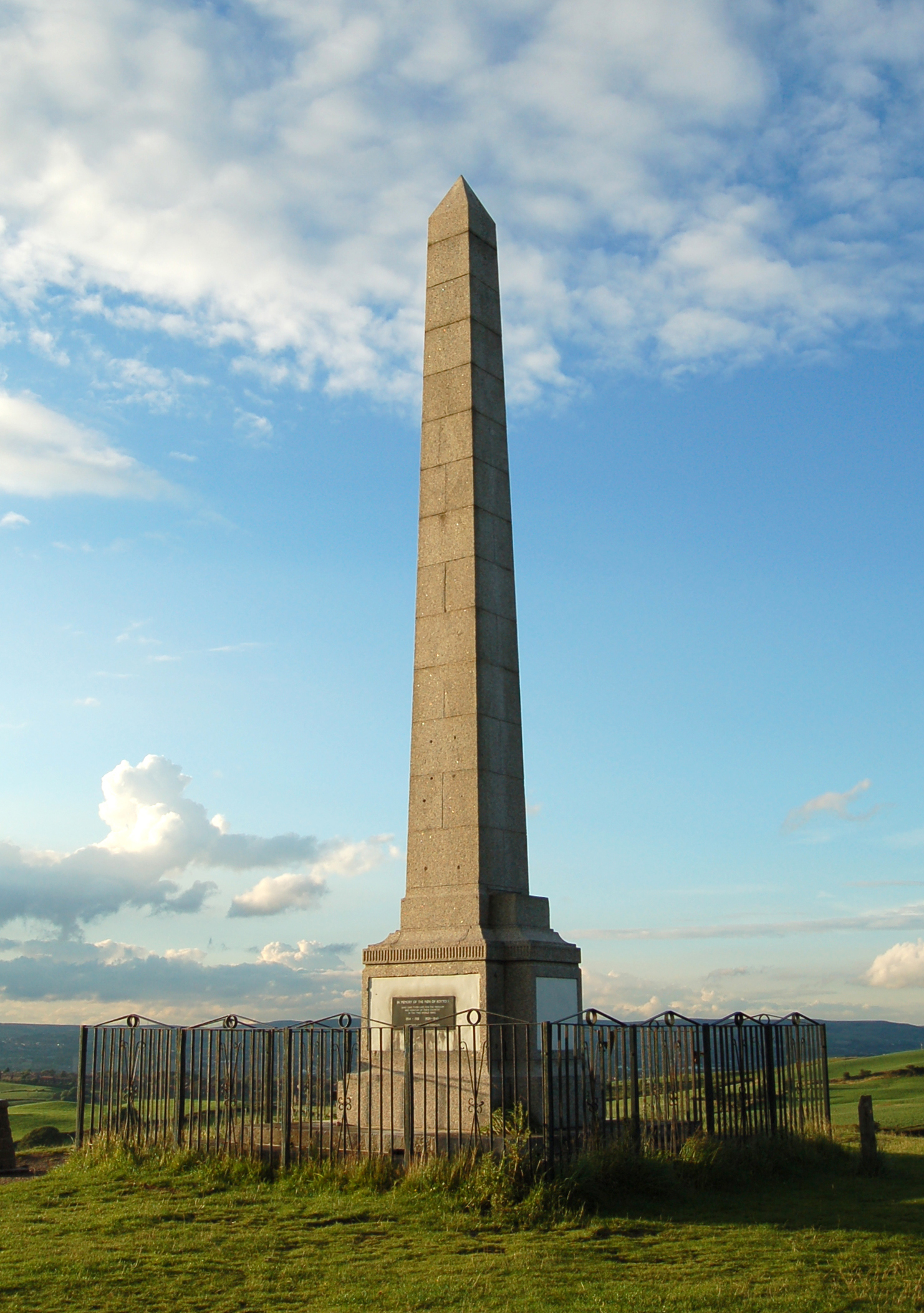
Royton War Memorial

Royton War Memorial lies at the summit of Tandle Hill, and was erected "in memory of the men of Royton who gave their lives for the freedom and honour of their country" during the First World War. It is a Portland stone obelisk, that originally bore plaques listing the fallen, and had a bronze sculpture of Victory at its base. It was commissioned by the Royton War Memorial Committee and unveiled on 22 October 1921 by Edward Stanley, 17th Earl of Derby. The original plaques were stolen in 1969, and replacements were later installed in the grounds of Royton's Church of St Paul.

Royton Library is a Carnegie library, a gift of Andrew Carnegie. It was opened in 1907 by Edward Stanley, 4th Baron Stanley of Alderley, an aristocrat and former Member of Parliament for the area. The surnames of four prominent writers—Bacon, Carlyle, Spencer and Milton—are inscribed above one of four windows on the building face, by the entrance.

== Transport ==
Public transport in Royton is co-ordinated by Transport for Greater Manchester’s Bee Network. Major A roads link Royton with other settlements, including the A671 road. Originally built as a turnpike between Oldham and Rochdale, the A671 bisects Royton from the southeast, forming the town's main street, before continuing northwards through Rochdale, Burnley and terminates at the village of Worston in Lancashire. The M62 motorway runs to the north of the area and is accessed via the A663 at junction 21 and junction 20 via the A627(M) motorway, which terminates at Royton's southwestern boundary.

Royton railway station lay at the end of a branch from Royton Junction on the Oldham Loop Line, which was part of the route which connected Manchester, Oldham and Rochdale. The station was opened in 1864 and closed in April 1966. It featured steep gradients on the line up to Royton Junction, which, in October 1908, caused an accident when a goods train ran out of control on the gradient down to the station, killing a fireman. In February 1961, a four-coach runaway train crashed through the buffers at Royton railway station and continued on over High Barn Street. Five houses were damaged. The driver of the train was injured, but there were no fatal or severe injuries to the public. Five people from the damaged houses were taken to hospital suffering from shock and bruises, and in one case a fractured clavicle.

There are frequent buses running through Royton with services to a variety of destinations in Greater Manchester. Bus services operate to Ashton-under-Lyne, Manchester, Middleton, Oldham, Rochdale, and Shaw and are operated by Stagecoach Manchester.

== Education ==
The Village School of Royton was founded in 1785, and continued to provide education until 1833, when a new school linked with Royton's parish church of St Paul, was opened. The village school became the local Sunday School, but split from St Paul's in 1838, reopening as a day school. The village school closed in 1907 and was demolished in 1969. Almost every suburb of Royton is served by a school of some kind, including some with religious affiliations. All the schools in the town perform either at or above the national average for test results.

Royton has eight primary schools and two secondary schools, E-Act Royton and Crompton Academy and Our Lady's RC High School. E-Act Royton and Crompton Academy is a coeducational, secondary comprehensive school for 11- to 16-year-olds. It has Science College status and was constructed in 1968. Our Lady's RC High School is a coeducational Roman Catholic high school and sixth form college for 11- to 19-year-olds. It was established in 1961 and specialialises in Mathematics and Computing. In the 2000s, Oldham Council and the Diocese of Salford agreed to merge Our Lady's with the St Augustine of Canterbury RC High School in Werneth. Although the proposal to have a newly built Catholic secondary on a new site in the 2010s, was met with protest, the new school, called the Newman Catholic College, was built at Chadderton by 2013.

== Sports ==
Royton Town F.C. is an amateur association football club which was established as the Stotts Benham works side in the Rochdale Alliance League, but changed its name to Royton Town in 1985. The team won the Rochdale Alliance Premier Division treble and were unbeaten for two and a half seasons, progressing to the Lancashire Amateur League in 1994. Since 2001–2002 it has played in the Premier Division of the Manchester Football League.

Royton Cricket Club, plays in the Central Lancashire Cricket League (winning it on two occasions in 1914 and 1980). The Crompton and Royton Golf Club lies on the western fringe of the town, and has a prime heathland 18-hole golf course, spanning 6,215 yards (5,683 m). The club operates a variety of open competitions.

Royton Amateur Swimming and Water Polo Club has been serving the town for over 100 years and is affiliated to the Central Lancashire Swimming Association.

== Religion ==
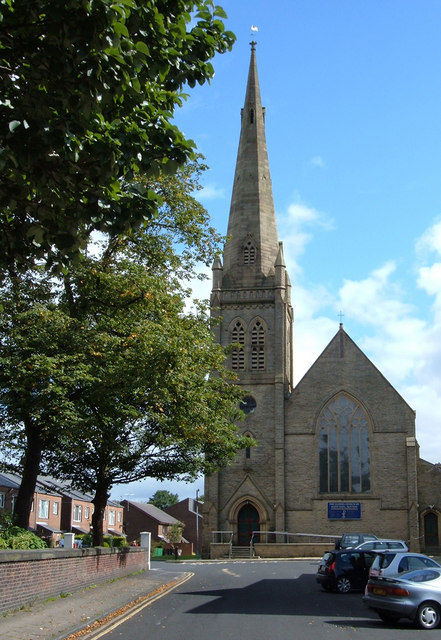
The Parish Church of St Paul, Royton is in the Anglican Diocese of Manchester.

Royton had no medieval church of its own, and for ecclesiastical purposes, lay within the parish of Prestwich-cum-Oldham in the Diocese of Lichfield, until 1541, when this diocese was divided and Royton became part of the Diocese of Chester. This in turn was divided in 1847, when the present Diocese of Manchester was created. For ritual baptisms, marriages and burials, the people of Royton, a Christian community, had to travel to churches that lay outside of the township's boundaries, including Oldham, St Mary's, Middleton, St Leonard's or Prestwich, St Mary's.

A chapel of ease under the mother church of Prestwich, St Mary's, was built between 1754 and 1757, paid for by voluntary contributions. The chapel was consecrated on 1 July 1757, dedicated to Paul the Apostle. St Paul's Chapel was extended throughout the 19th century as the population of Royton grew, with a tower and clock added in 1828 and extensions in 1854 and again in 1883. The nave of the chapel was demolished in 1889 and the existing church building in neo-Gothic style was erected. St Paul's is in the Oldham West Deanery of the Diocese of Manchester. The Westwood Moravian Church congregation has recently relocated to Royton.

In addition to the established church, a variety of Reformed denominations have been practised in Royton. The Religious Society of Friends were recorded as holding conventicles in Heyside in as early as the 1650s. A Baptist meeting place was erected in 1775. Congregational preachers regularly visited Royton, but it was not until 1854 that a workshop was established in the town. Primitive Methodism was established in Royton in a room in a Royley building, with its first purpose-built church being erected in 1867.

Roman Catholicism in Royton after the English Reformation began in 1874, when a disused factory was used as a chapel. Sir Percival Radcliffe, the then owner of Royton Hall, gave land and £2,000 towards the construction of a new Catholic school-chapel which opened in 1880; the local priest lived at Royton Hall. A rectory was built in 1901 and in 1966 the church, dedicated to saints Aidan and Oswald, was rebuilt. Royton, which forms part of the Roman Catholic Diocese of Salford, continues to have a Catholic community, supported by Our Lady's R.C. High School.

== Public services ==
Home Office policing in Royton is provided by the Greater Manchester Police. Before its demolition in 2015 there had been a police station in Royton since 1855. Public transport is co-ordinated by Transport for Greater Manchester. Statutory emergency fire and rescue service is provided by the Greater Manchester Fire and Rescue Service.

There are no hospitals in Royton, although the Royal Oldham Hospital lies at Royton's boundary in neighbouring Coldhurst, in Oldham; some local health care is provided by Royton Health and Well-being Centre, an NHS surgery under the Pennine Care NHS Foundation Trust. The Royton Health and Well-being Centre, which opened in October 2010, replaced Royton Health Centre which had been criticised for its limited space and poor layout. The Primary Care Trust plan to sell the old Royton Health Centre premises.

The North West Ambulance Service provides emergency patient transport in the area. Other forms of health care are provided for locally by several small specialist clinics and surgeries. Dr Kershaw's Hospice was opened in 1989, but traces its origins to a cottage hospital built in the 1930s with a legacy from Dr John Kershaw, a local General Practitioner and Medical Officer for Health. Dr Kershaw's Hospice, a registered charity, provides specialist palliative care for adults with non-curable life-threatening illnesses.

Waste management is co-ordinated by the via the Greater Manchester Waste Disposal Authority. Locally produced inert waste for disposal is sent to landfill at the Beal Valley. Royton's distribution network operator for electricity is United Utilities; there are no power stations in the town. United Utilities also manages Royton's drinking and waste water; water supplies are sourced from several local reservoirs, including Dovestone and Chew.

== Notable people ==
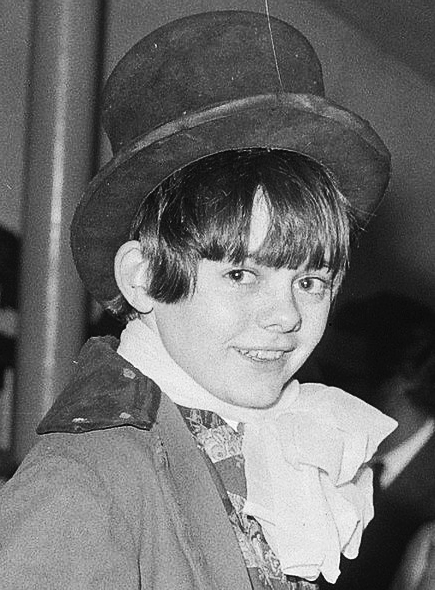
Jack Wild as the Artful Dodger in Oliver!, 1968

- Sir John Byron (c. 1526–1600), an Elizabethan nobleman, landowner, politician and knight.
- Baron Byron (1643), a title in the Peerage of England, created in 1643; thirteen successors
- John Lees (born ca.1730) an inventor who improved the machinery for carding cotton in 1772.
- George Travis (1741–1797) was Archdeacon of Chester, from 1786 to 1797.
- Radcliffe Baronets (1813) a title in the Baronetage of the United Kingdom, created in 1813; seven successors.
- John Hogan (1884–1943), recipient of the Victoria Cross, sergeant in The Manchester Regiment.
- Sir Harry Platt, 1st Baronet (1886–1986), an orthopaedic surgeon & president of the Royal College of Surgeons of England (1954–1957).
- Jack Wild (1952–2006), actor and singer, played the Artful Dodger in the film Oliver! (1968). he was nominated for an Academy Award for Best Supporting Actor.
- Kieran O'Brien (born 1973), actor, gained notoriety for his sexually explicit role in the 2004 film 9 Songs.
- Craig Gazey (born 1982), actor, played Graeme Proctor in the ITV soap Coronation Street.
- Michelle Marsh (born 1982), former glamour model.
- Nick Grimshaw (born 1984), radio and TV presenter.
- Olivia Cooke (born 1993), actress, played Alicent Hightower in the TV series House of the Dragon.

=== Sport ===
- Alan Groves (1948–1978), footballer, he played 303 games including 140 for Oldham Athletic.
- Alan Waldron (born 1951), footballer who played 215 games including 141 for Bolton Wanderers.
- Steve Taylor (born 1955), footballer who played 445 games for several local teams.

== See also ==
- Listed buildings in Royton
