= Thornham, Greater Manchester =

Area of Greater Manchester, England

Coordinates: 53.583123°N 2.135204°W

Thornham
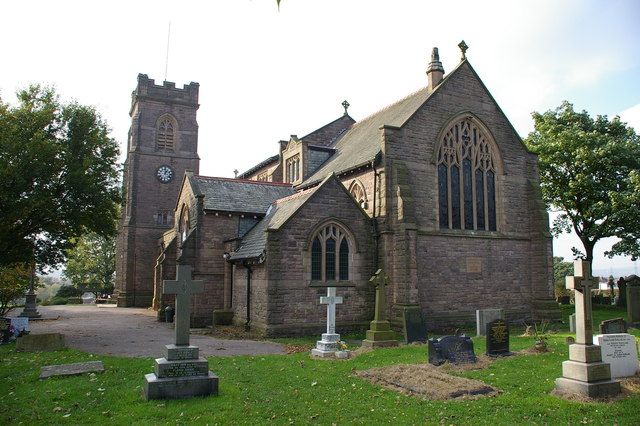
- St John the Evangelist Church, Thornham

- Location within Greater Manchester
- OS grid reference: SD910096
- Metropolitan borough: Oldham; Rochdale
- Metropolitan county: Greater Manchester
- Region: North West
- Country: England
- Sovereign state: United Kingdom
- Post town: OLDHAM
- Postcode district: OL2
- Post town: ROCHDALE
- Postcode district: OL16
- Dialling code: 0161; 01706
- Police: Greater Manchester
- Fire: Greater Manchester
- Ambulance: North West
- UK Parliament: Oldham West and Royton; Rochdale

Thornham is a suburban area straddling Middleton, Royton and Rochdale in Greater Manchester, England. The area crosses the border of the Metropolitan Borough of Oldham and the Metropolitan Borough of Rochdale and is divided at a constituency and electoral ward level.

Historically part of Lancashire, Thornham was once a township within the parish of Middleton, encompassing the outlying hamlets of Slattocks, Stake Hill, Buersill Head and Tandle Hill, before being divided between Middleton, Royton, and Rochdale by the Local Government Act 1894. Part of this area was known as Gravel Hole, because of large gravel pits, and is still referred to as such on some maps.

== Governance ==
Lying within the historic county boundaries of Lancashire since the early 12th century, Thornham was a township in the ecclesiastical parish of Middleton and Oldham poor law union. In 1866 Thornham became a separate civil parish. In 1879, part of the township was included in the area of the commissioners for the improvement of Middleton and Tonge townships, and in 1886 became part of the municipal borough of Middleton. In 1879, other parts of the township were included in the Royton and Castleton-by-Rochdale local boards of health. In 1894 the parish was dissolved and its area divided between Royton and Middleton, part also went to form Castleton by Rochdale, with Castleton by Rochdale Urban District divided between the County Borough of Rochdale and Municipal Borough of Heywood in 1900. In 1891 the parish had a population of 1895.

== Transport ==
The intersection of the M62 and the A627(M) is known as Thornham Interchange.

== Education ==
Thornham is served by "Thornham St. James Cof E Primary School" (which lies within the border of Royton and is thus administered by Oldham L.E.A) and "St John's CE Primary Thornham" (which lies within Rochdale), and thus administered by Rochdale L.E.A. For secondary education, St Cuthbert's RC High School is also located in the Rochdale part of the area.

== Notable people ==
- Sir Harry Platt, 1st Baronet, orthopaedic surgeon
