= Metropolitan Borough of Oldham =

Borough of Greater Manchester, England

- Metropolitan borough
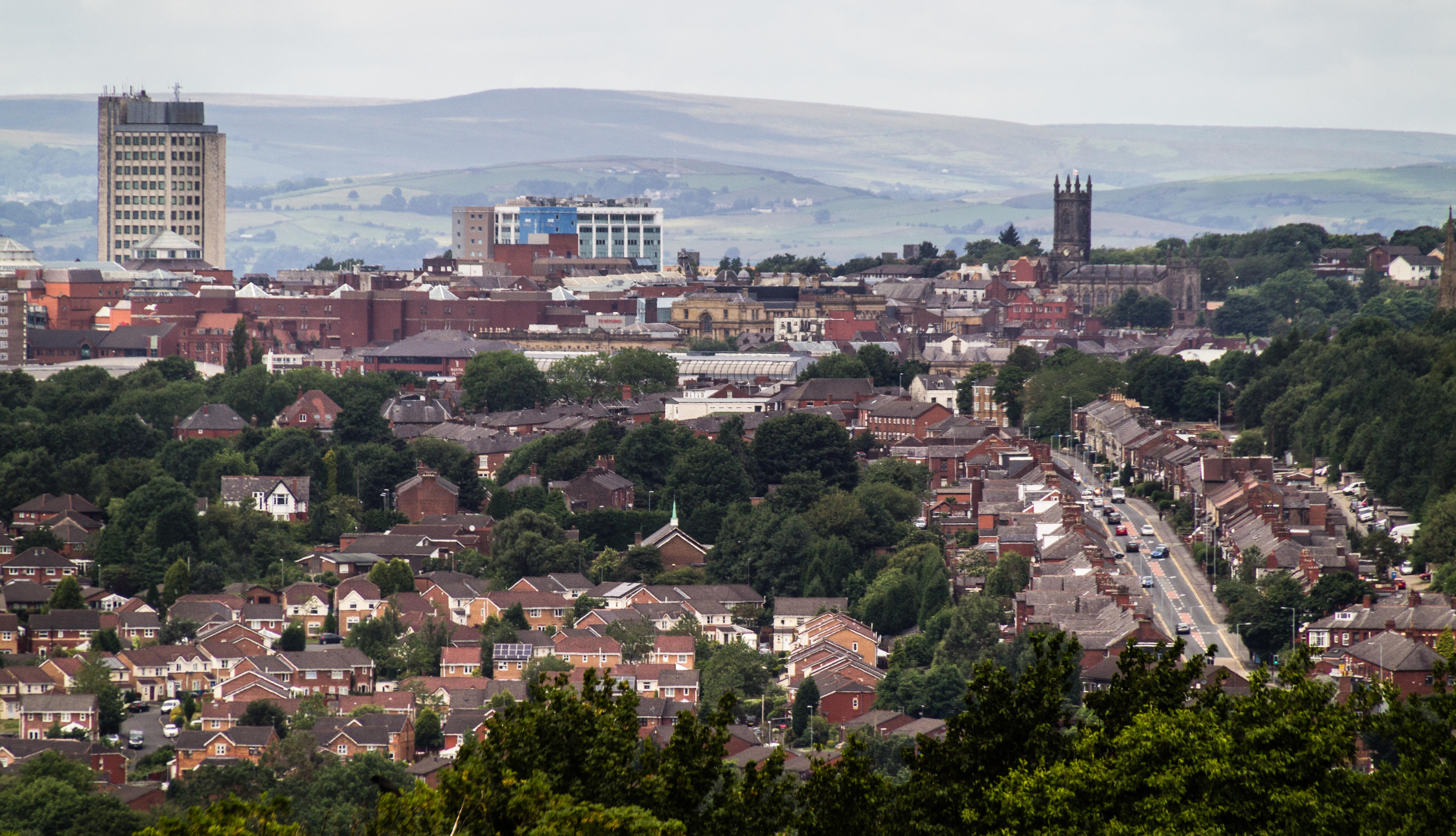
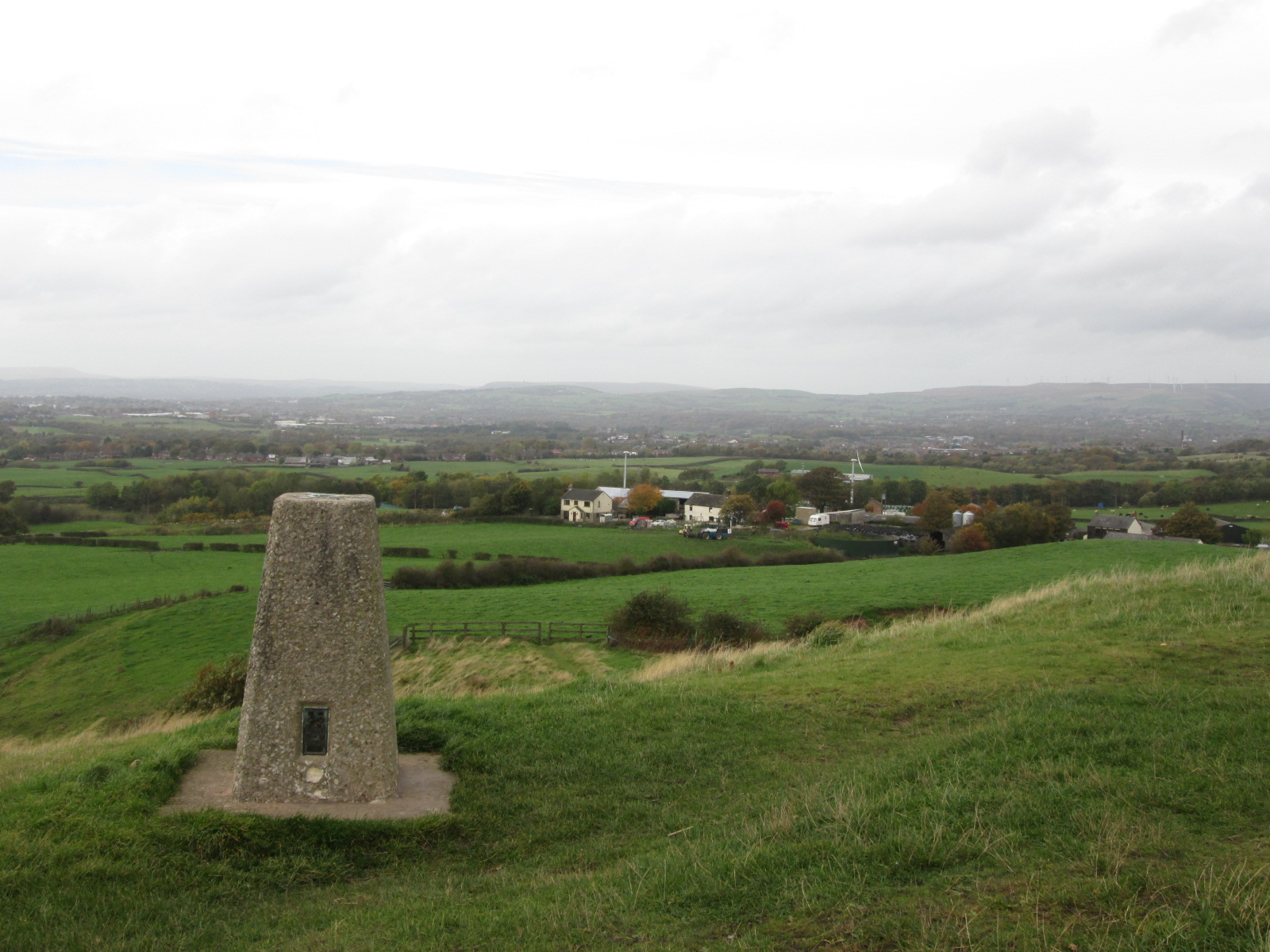
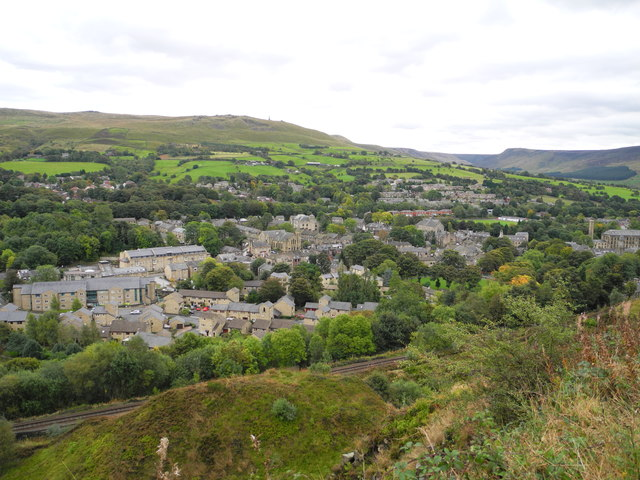
- Clockwise from the top; Oldham skyline with the Civic Centre (left) and St. Mary with St. Peter Church (centre right), Uppermill within Saddleworth and Tandle Hill trig point.

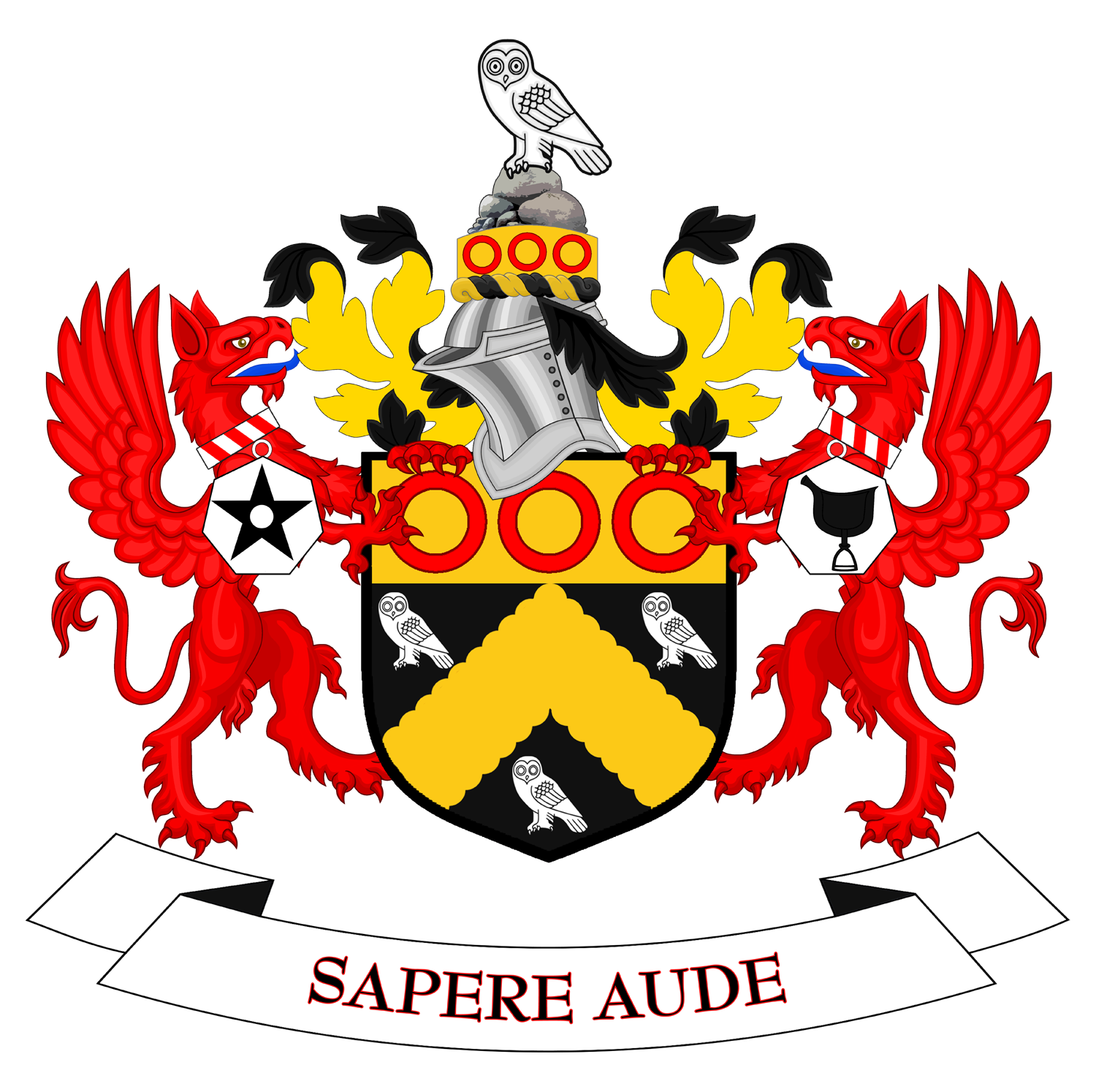
- Coat of arms
- Motto(s): Latin: Sapere Aude, lit. 'dare to be wise'
- Oldham shown within Greater Manchester
- Coordinates: 53°32′N 2°07′W
- Sovereign state: United Kingdom
- Country: England
- Region: North West
- Ceremonial county and city region: Greater Manchester
- Incorporated: 1 April 1974
- Named for: Oldham
- Administrative HQ: Oldham Civic Centre

Government
  - Type: Metropolitan borough
  - Body: Oldham Council
  - Executive: Leader and cabinet
  - Control: No overall control
  - Leader: Vacant
  - Mayor: Eddie Moores
  - MPs: 3 MPs: Debbie Abrahams (L); Jim McMahon (L); Lucy Powell (L)

Area
  - Total: 142 km^{2} (55 sq mi)
  - Rank: 167th

Population (2025)
  - Total: 251,915
  - Rank: 76th
  - Density: 1,770/km^{2} (4,600/sq mi)
- Demonym: Oldhamer

Ethnicity (2021)
  - Ethnic groups: List: 68.1% White; 24.6% Asian; 3.4% Black; 2.5% Mixed; 1.4% other

Religion (2021)
  - Religion: List: 44.9% Christianity; 25.0% no religion; 24.4% Islam; 0.5% Hinduism; 0.2% Buddhism; 0.1% Judaism; 0.1% Sikhism; 0.2% other; 4.7% not stated
- Time zone: UTC+0 (GMT)
  - Summer (DST): UTC+1 (BST)
- Postcode area: M; OL
- Dialling code: 01457; 0161; 01706
- ISO 3166 code: GB-OLD
- GSS code: E08000004
- Website: oldham.gov.uk

The Metropolitan Borough of Oldham is a metropolitan borough of Greater Manchester in England. It is named after its largest town, Oldham. The borough had a population of 251,915 in 2025, making it the sixth-largest district by population in Greater Manchester. The borough spans 142 square kilometres (55 sq mi).

== Geography ==
Part of Oldham is rural and semi-rural, with a quarter of the borough lying within the Peak District National Park.

The Metropolitan Borough of Rochdale lies to the north-west, the Metropolitan Borough of Kirklees (of West Yorkshire) to the east, and the Metropolitan Borough of Tameside to the south. The City of Manchester lies directly to the south west and the Derbyshire Borough of High Peak lies directly to the south east, but Derbyshire is only bordered by high moorland near Black Hill and is not accessible by road.

== History ==
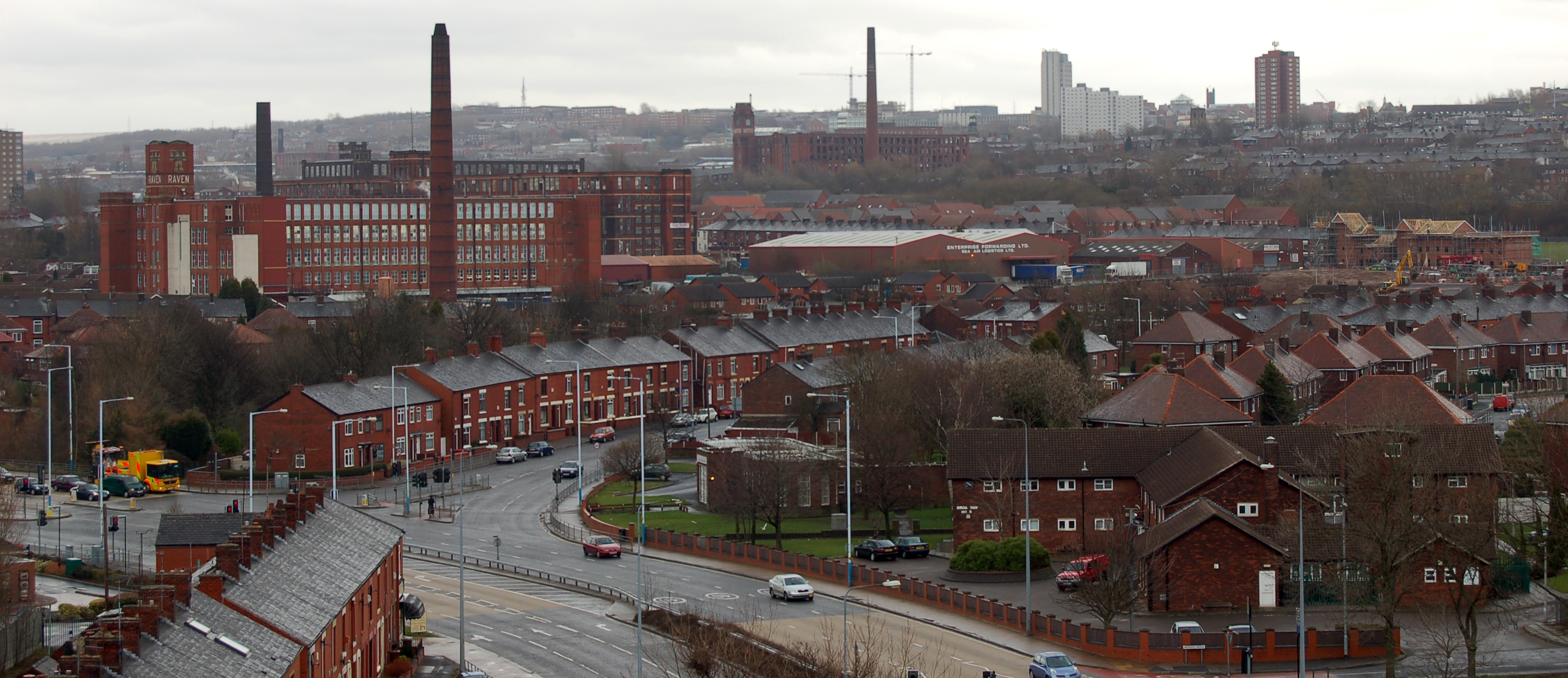
Skyline of Chadderton, looking towards Oldham in the distance

Following both the Local Government Act 1888 and Local Government Act 1894, local government in England had been administered via a national framework of rural districts, urban districts, municipal boroughs and county boroughs, which (apart from the latter which were independent) shared power with strategic county councils of the administrative counties. The areas that were incorporated into the Metropolitan Borough of Oldham in 1974 had formed part of Chadderton Urban District, Crompton Urban District, Failsworth Urban District, Lees Urban District and Royton Urban District from the administrative county of Lancashire, Saddleworth Urban District from the West Riding of Yorkshire, and the politically independent County Borough of Oldham. By the early 1970s, nationally, this system of demarcation was described as "archaic" and "grossly inadequate to keep pace both with the impact of motor travel, and with the huge increases in local government responsibilities". After the exploration of reform, such as the proposals made by the Redcliffe-Maud Report in the late 1960s, the Local Government Act 1972 restructured local government in England by creating a system of two-tier metropolitan and non-metropolitan counties and districts throughout the country. The act formally established the Metropolitan Borough of Oldham as a local government district of the new metropolitan county of Greater Manchester on 1 April 1974. The district was granted honorific borough status on 23 November 1973 by Queen Elizabeth II of the United Kingdom, which allowed the council to have a mayor. The new dual local authorities of Oldham Metropolitan Borough Council and Greater Manchester County Council had been running since elections in 1973 however. The leading article in The Times on the day the Local Government Act came into effect noted that the "new arrangement is a compromise which seeks to reconcile familiar geography which commands a certain amount of affection and loyalty, with the scale of operations on which modern planning methods can work effectively".

Oldham Council's corporate logo, designed in 1974 by David McRae for the new authority. This logo was replaced in 2008 as part of a rebranding exercise.

The new "One Oldham" branding for the borough, used from 2008

The borough is noted as one of the more unpopular amalgamations of territory created by local government reform in the 1970s. This being especially true of residents of the parish of Saddleworth who viewed the new arrangement as a "retrograde step". It had been proposed in a government White paper that the Metropolitan Borough of Oldham include the former mill town of Middleton. However this was given to the Metropolitan Borough of Rochdale once it was decided that Rochdale and Bury would not be merged. Before its creation, it was suggested that the metropolitan borough be named New Oldham, but that was rejected. For its first 12 years the borough had a two-tier system of local government; Oldham Council shared power with the Greater Manchester County Council. Since the Local Government Act 1985 Oldham Council has effectively been a unitary authority, serving as the sole executive, deliberative and legislative body responsible for local policy, setting council tax, and allocating budget in the district. The Metropolitan Borough of Oldham has two civil parishes and 20 electoral wards. Noted as one of the more unpopular amalgamations of territory created by local government reform in the 1970s, the Oldham borough underwent a £100,000 rebranding exercise in early 2008. The town has no listed buildings with a Grade I rating, the only one of the ten boroughs of Greater Manchester to do so, and the borough's architecture has been described as "mediocre". There have been calls for the borough to be renamed, but that possibility was dismissed during the rebranding of 2008.

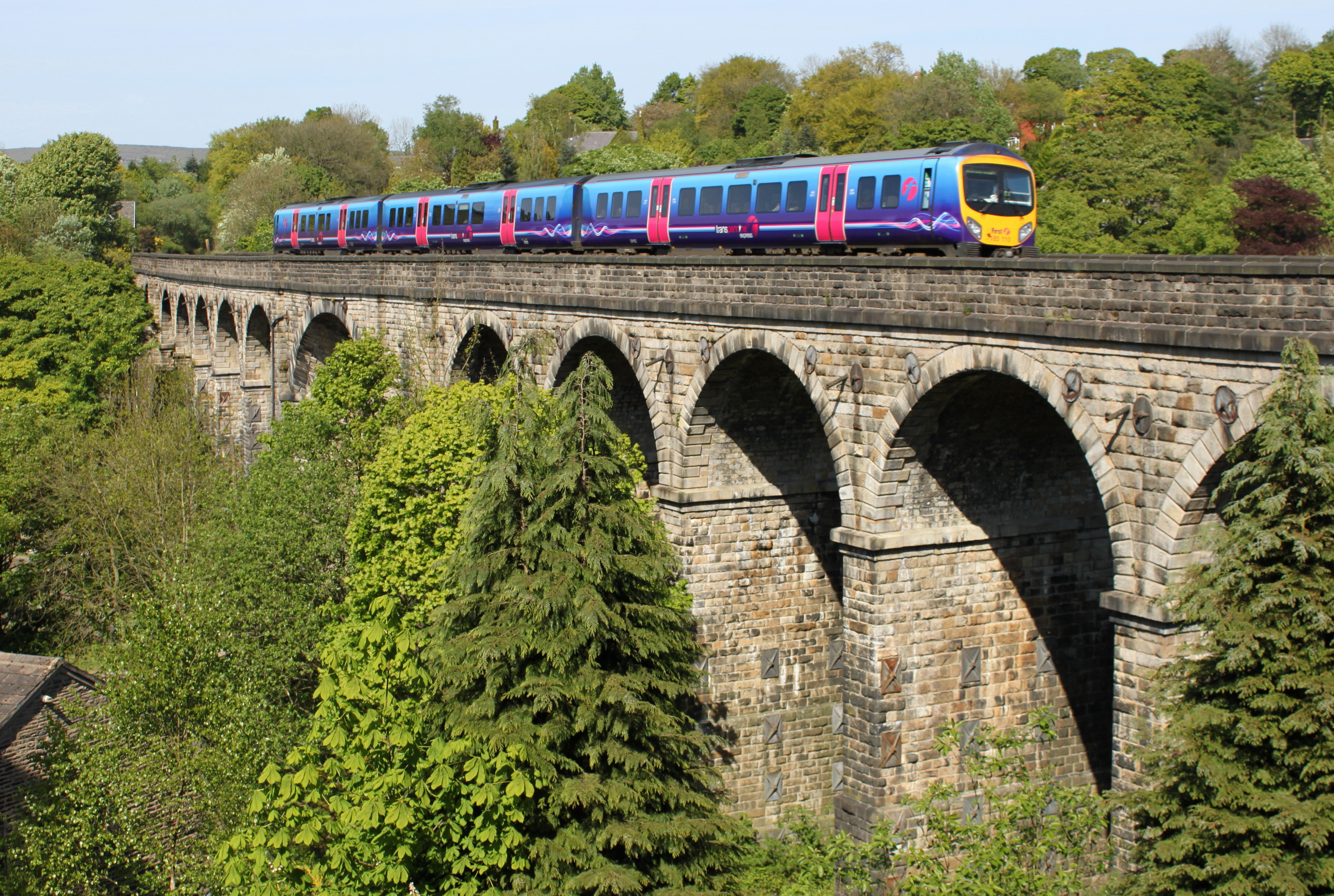
Saddleworth Viaduct

In the early 20th century, following some exchanges of land, there were attempts to amalgamate Chadderton Urban District with the County Borough of Oldham. However, this was resisted by councillors from Chadderton Urban District Council.

The Oldham borough underwent a rebranding exercise in 2008 with a view to improving cross-community unity. Officials believed the borough's image was outdated and that "often negative" national media coverage held and continues to hold back businesses and hampers attempts to attract new investors, visitors and external funding. There had been calls for the borough to be renamed to a "settlement-neutral" name (such as those of neighbouring districts of Calderdale, Kirklees and Tameside) as part of the rebranding. However, consultants cited that this idea came from a "vocal minority" wishing to distance themselves from Oldham. The borough name was unchanged.

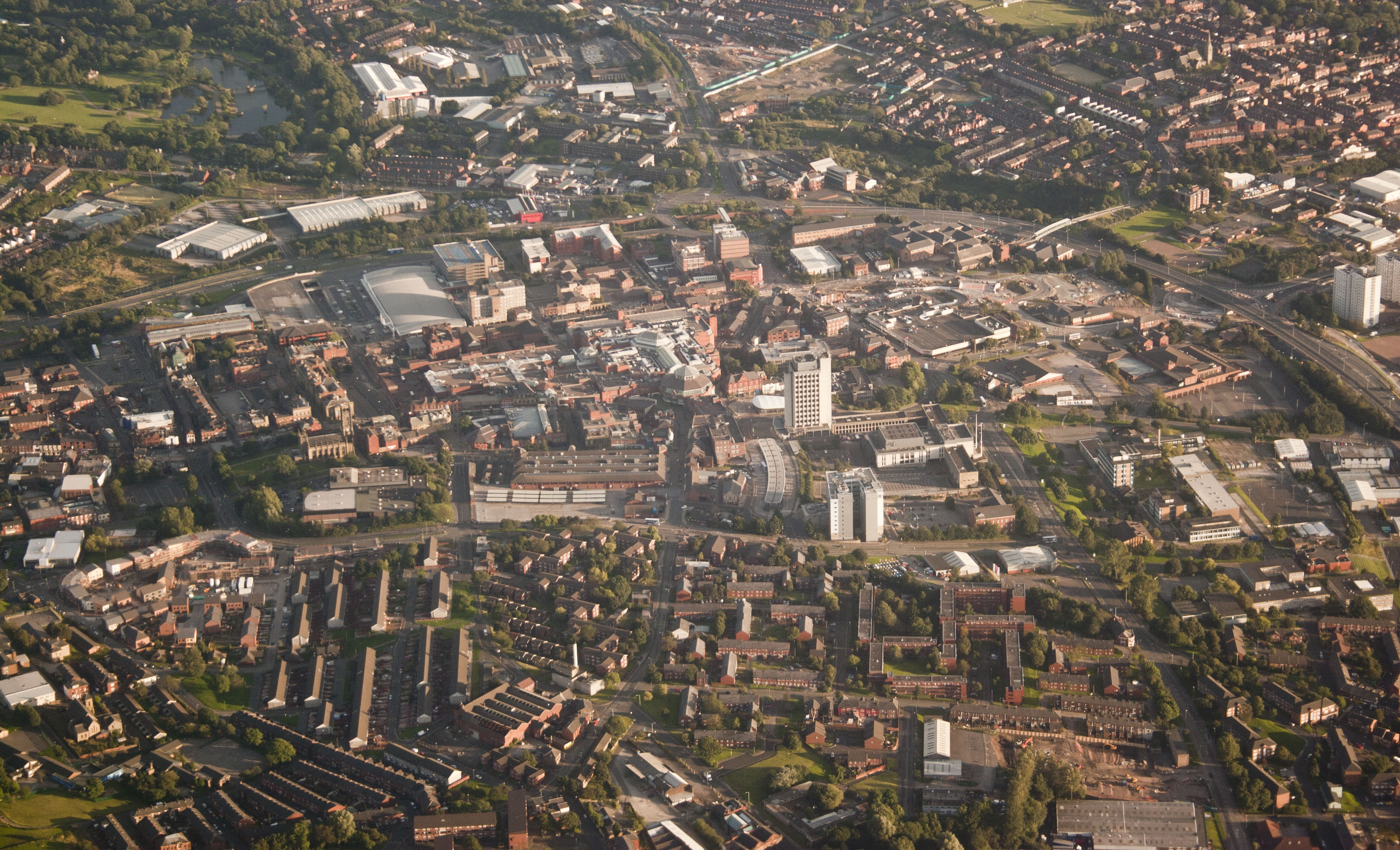
Oldham Town Centre aerial view from the north

=== Council ===
For the first 12 years after the county was created in 1974, the borough had a two-tier system of local government, and so Oldham Council shared power with the Greater Manchester County Council. The Greater Manchester County Council, a strategic authority running regional services such as transport, strategic planning, emergency services and waste disposal, comprised 106 members drawn from the ten metropolitan boroughs of Greater Manchester. However, in 1986, along with the five other metropolitan county councils and the Greater London Council, the Greater Manchester County Council was abolished, and most of its powers were devolved to the boroughs. Since 1986, Oldham Council has effectively been a unitary authority that serves as the sole executive, deliberative and legislative body responsible for setting local policy, and allocating budget. Its duties also include setting levels of council tax, monitoring the health service in the borough, providing social care, and providing funding for schools. The borough's centre of administration was Oldham Civic Centre.. In 2025 the council chambers and executive was moved to the former Grade II Oldham Library on union st and much of the council services were moved to the upper floors of the Spindles shopping centre after the council bought it for £9.5m in October 2020. The former council chamber, Queen Elizabeth hall and office buildings are to be demolished in 2026 and housing built on the land. The Civic centre tower will remain.

Civil parishes form the bottom tier of statutory local government; the parish councils are involved in planning, management of town and parish centres, and promoting tourism. In 2001, 46,072 people lived in Oldham's two civil parishes—Saddleworth and Shaw and Crompton—20.9% of the borough's population. The rest of the borough is unparished.

In 2008 a critical Audit Commission inspection found that Oldham Council's rate of improvement was ‘adequate’ and gave it a two-star rating. It said the rate of improvement had increased but had been "inconsistent".

Since 2011 Oldham is one of the ten member authorities of the Greater Manchester Combined Authority (GMCA) which is a top tier local authority with responsibility for Transport, Health, Housing and Economic matters. The membership of the Combined Authority is drawn from the Leaders or Executive Mayors of each of the ten councils. In December 2012, Oldham was named ‘Most Improved Council’ at the Local Government Chronicle awards. A team of six experienced politicians and officers from the Local Government Association carried out another independent ‘peer review’ of Oldham Council in December 2013. Their report said: "There has been a remarkable transformation in Oldham in recent years, both in terms of the place and in having established an ambitious and effective council. The authority can be proud of what has been achieved."

In February 2014 ex-Council Leader Jim McMahon was named ‘Council Leader of the Year’ by the LGiU thinktank who said his "strong leadership has helped lead to a dramatic improvement in service delivery and correlating significant improvement in resident satisfaction rates."

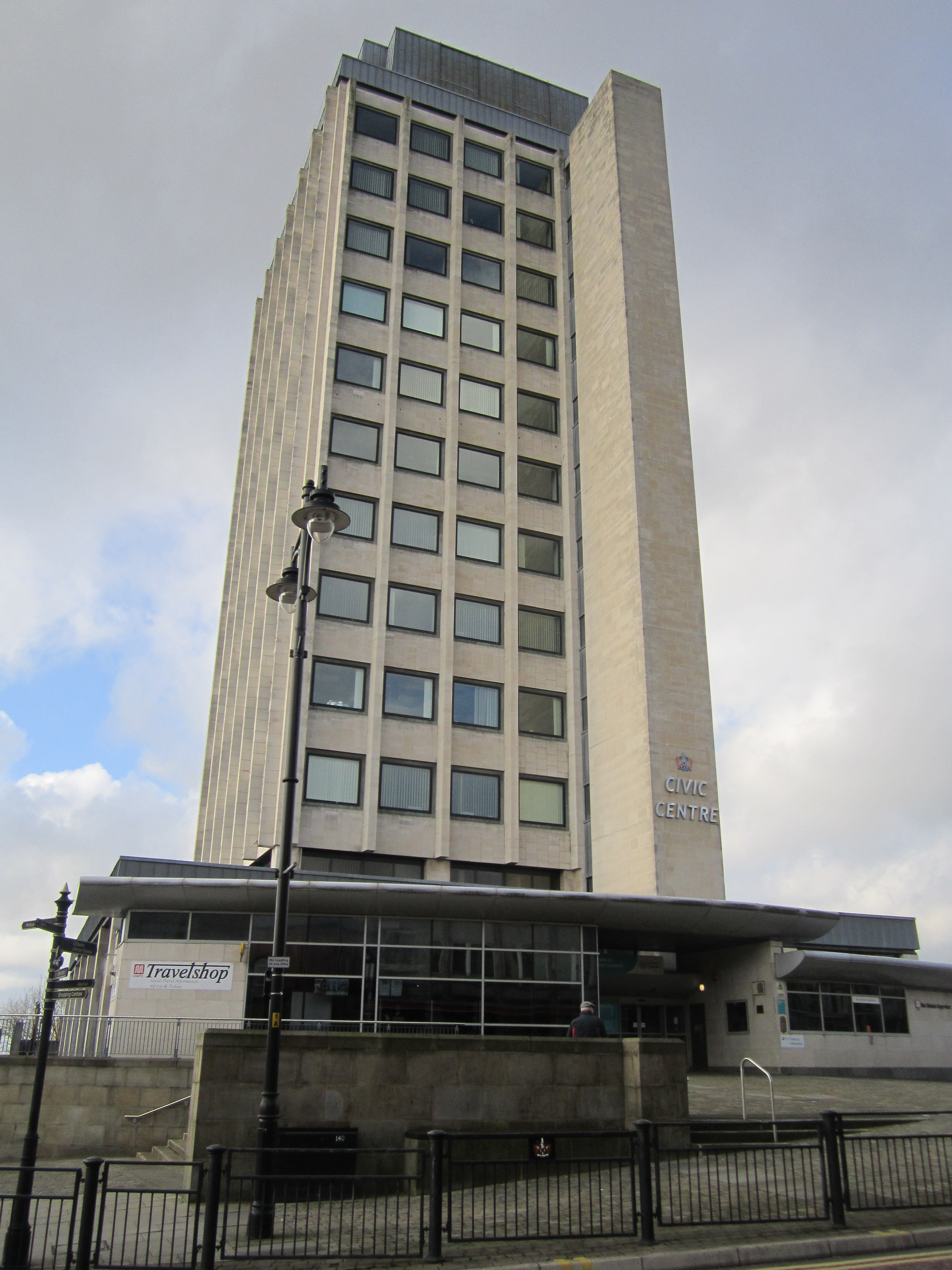
Oldham Civic Centre, the former headquarters of Oldham Borough Council 1977-2025

=== Decision making ===
The council operates a "strong leader" cabinet model, under which the person elected to be the leader of the council personally holds all the executive decision making powers. It a matter of discretion for the leader whether he/she exercises those powers personally or delegates them. Generally decisions are delegated to individual cabinet members or to the council's cabinet.

The cabinet is made up of leader, a deputy leader and up to nine councillors appointed by the leader. The cabinet is responsible for strategic decisions and recommends proposals for approval by full council on the budget, Council tax levels and the council's policy framework.

Some decisions are delegated by council to district executives. There are six districts containing between two and five wards; Chadderton, Failsworth & Hollinwood, Oldham, Royton, Saddleworth & Lees and Shaw & Crompton. Membership of each district executive is drawn from the elected councillors within each district.

=== Political composition ===
Since the council's formation it has generally been under the control of the Labour Party. Since 2011, the Labour Party has had overall control until the elections in 2024 when it had a minority of the seats but combined with 4 independents to form an administration. In 2026 they lost control, they remain the largest party with 18 seat of the 60 seats on the council with Reform holding 16, The Oldham Group holding 10 and the remaining 16 seats spread between the Lib Dems, Conservatives and various Independents.

Party political make-up of Oldham Borough Council
Party	Seats							Current Council (2018–26)
Party	2018	2019	2021	2022	2023	2024	2026	Current Council (2018–26)
Lib Dems	8	8	8	9	10	9	6	
Labour	47	45	40	35	32	27	18	
Conservative	4	4	8	9	11	8	4	
Reform UK	n/a	n/a	n/a	n/a	n/a	n/a	16	
The Oldham Group	n/a	n/a	n/a	n/a	n/a	9	10	
Other	1	2	4	7	7	7	6	

== Outlying towns, villages and suburbs ==
Aside from Oldham, the borough covers other towns and villages including:

- Chadderton
- Failsworth
- Shaw and Crompton
- Saddleworth, which consists of numerous villages and halmets including Delph, Diggle, Dobcross, Greenfield, Grasscroft, Grotton and Springhead)
- Royton
- Glodwick
- Werneth

=== Electoral wards ===
The Metropolitan Borough of Oldham is divided into 20 electoral wards, each which elects three councillors who generally sit for a four-year term on the Oldham Metropolitan Borough Council. The twenty wards are:

Electoral Ward	District	Population	Councillors
Alexandra	Oldham	11,830	3
Chadderton Central	Chadderton	10,454	3
Chadderton North	Chadderton	11,031	3
Chadderton South	Chadderton	11,019	3
Coldhurst	Oldham	13,233	3
Crompton	Shaw & Crompton	10,581	3
Failsworth East	Failsworth & Hollinwood	10,352	3
Failsworth West	Failsworth & Hollinwood	10,397	3
Hollinwood	Failsworth & Hollinwood	11,297	3
Medlock Vale	Oldham	12,414	3
Royton North	Royton	10,283	3
Royton South	Royton	11,001	3
Saddleworth North	Saddleworth & Lees	9,672	3
Saddleworth South	Saddleworth & Lees	10,043	3
Saddleworth West & Lees	Saddleworth & Lees	11,196	3
St James	Oldham	11,473	3
St Marys	Oldham	13,994	3
Shaw	Shaw & Crompton	10,501	3
Waterhead	Oldham	12,027	3
Werneth	Oldham	12,149	3

=== Coat of arms ===
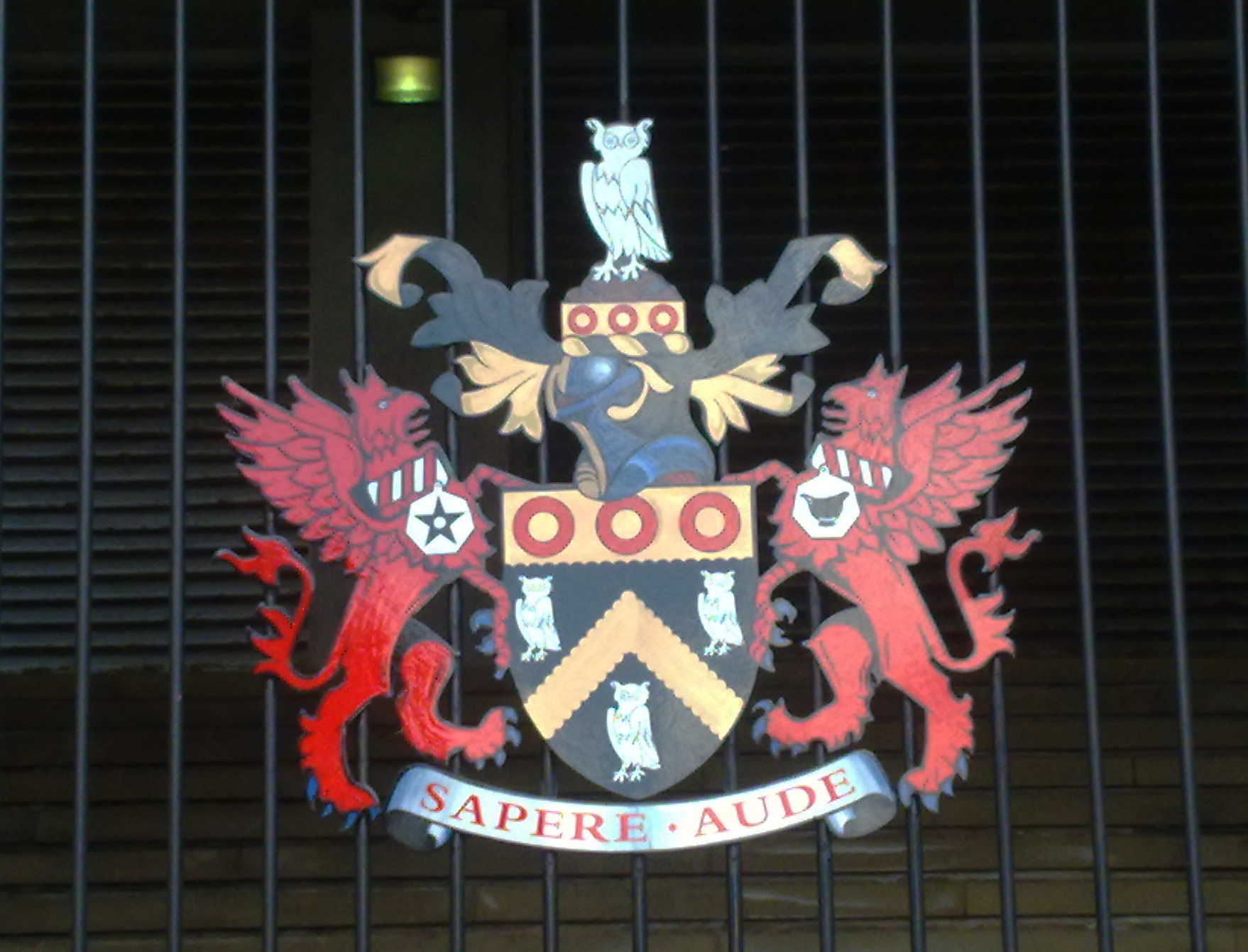
Oldham council's coat of arms, seen here at the Civic Centre

Following the 1974 reorganisation, a new coat of arms was granted to Oldham Metropolitan Borough Council, based closely on that of the predecessor Oldham County Borough Council. Like the county borough's arms, which dated from 1894, the new coat is derived from the arms of the Oldham family. The most famous member of the family was Hugh Oldham, Bishop of Exeter and founder of the Manchester Grammar School. The Oldham family arms were:

Sable a chevron Or between three owls argent on a chief of the second as many roses gules.

The owls were a "canting" reference, or heraldic pun, on the original pronunciation of the name. This is still reflected in the local pronunciation of "Ow'dom". In the Metropolitan Borough's arms the gold chief (upper third of the shield) and chevron have "invected" or fluted edges. The arms are further differenced by the replacement of the three red roses by three red annulets or circles, representing the initial "O" of the authority's name.

The crest, an owl upon a rock, is placed on a helm above the shield. In order to distinguish the crest from that of the county borough, it rises from a gold circlet bearing six red annulets. The crest wreath and decorative mantling repeat the black and gold colouring of the arms.

Oldham Metropolitan Borough Council was granted supporters and a heraldic badge. The supporters recall the local authorities merged in 1974, and are made up of portions of the arms of the ancient manorial lords. The red griffins come from the arms of the Chadderton and Chetham families. Each griffin wears a collar with an "engrailed" edge recalling the arms of the Radcliffe family. Each collar bears red bendlets from the arms of the Byrons. From the collars hang heptagons, the seven sides representing the union of seven councils. One heptagon bears a black spur-rowel from the Assheton family arms, the other a black saddle, recalling the derivation of the name "Saddleworth".

The badge is a black heptagon bearing a silver owl, the whole contained within a red annulet.

The Latin motto of the county borough continues in use: Sapere Aude or "dare to be wise" refers to the owls in the arms, while "Aude", pronounced "Owd" continues the pun. The motto is also used by Manchester Grammar School.

The blazon is as follows:

Sable a chevron invected or between three owls argent on a chief engrailed or as many annulets gules; and for a Crest: On a wreath of the colours issuant from a circlet or charged with six annulets gules a rock proper thereon an owl argent.

Supporters: On either side a griffin gules each gorged with a collar engrailed argent charged with six bendlets gules pendant therefrom a heptagon argent that on the dexter charged with a pierced mullet that on the sinister with a saddle both sable.

Badge or Device: On a heptagon sable environed by an annulet gules an owl argent.

=== Parishes ===
Showing status at 31 March 1974 (prior to the Local Government Act 1972 taking effect).

1. Saddleworth (Saddleworth Urban District)
2. Shaw and Crompton (Crompton Urban District)

=== Unparished areas ===
Showing former status.

1. Chadderton (Chadderton Urban District)
2. Failsworth (Failsworth Urban District)
3. Lees (Lees Urban District)
4. Oldham (County Borough of Oldham)
5. Royton (Royton Urban District)

== Demography ==
=== Ethnic groups ===
Ethnic Group	Year							
Ethnic Group	1981 estimations		1991 census		2001 census		2021 census	
Ethnic Group	Number	%	Number	%	Number	%	Number	%
White: Total	207,910	94.5%	200,217	91.2%	187,162	86.2%	164,897	68.2%
White: British	–	–	–	–	183,297	84.4%	157,914	65.2%
White: Irish	–	–	–	–	1,962	0.9%	1,279	0.5%
White: Roma	–	–	–	–	–	–	549	0.2%
White: Gypsy or Irish Traveller	–	–	–	–	–	–	177	0.1%
White: Other	–	–	–	–	1,903	0.9%	4,978	2.1%
Asian or Asian British: Total	10,149	4.6%	16,759	7.6%	26,215	12%	59,565	24.5%
Asian or Asian British: Indian	1,207		1,600		1,562	0.7%	1,676	0.7%
Asian or Asian British: Pakistani	5,910	2.7%	9,204		13,754	6.3%	32,802	13.5%
Asian or Asian British: Bangladeshi	2,559	1.2%	5,286		9,817	4.5%	21,754	9.0%
Asian or Asian British: Chinese	293		403		408	0.2%	819	0.3%
Asian or Asian British: Other Asian	180		266		674	0.3%	2,514	1.0%
Black or Black British: Total	1,381		1,855		1,235	0.6%	8,209	3.4%
Black or Black British: African	104		149		182		6,065	2.5%
Black or Black British: Caribbean	832		1,085		931	0.4%	876	0.4%
Other Black	445		621		122		1,268	0.5%
Mixed or British Mixed: Total	–	–	–	–	2,451	1.1%	6,125	2.6%
Mixed: White and Black Caribbean	–	–	–	–	1,287	0.6	2,353	1.0
Mixed: White and Black African	–	–	–	–	187	0.1	1,043	0.4
Mixed: White and Asian	–	–	–	–	686	0.3	1,829	0.8
Mixed: Other Mixed	–	–	–	–	291	0.1	900	0.4
Other: Total	522		768		210	0.1%	3,291	1.3%
Other: Arab	–	–	–	–			521	0.2
Other: Any other ethnic group	–	–	–	–			2,770	1.1
Ethnic minority: Total	12,052	5.5%	19,382	8.8%	30,111	14%	77,190	31.8%
Total	219,962	100%	219,599	100%	217,273	100%	242,088	100%

=== Religion ===
The following table shows the religious affiliation of residents in Oldham.

Religion	2011		2021	
Religion	Number	%	Number	%
Christian	134,167	59.7	108,720	44.9
Muslim	39,879	17.7	59,031	24.4
Jewish	108	<0.1	146	0.1
Hindu	1,233	0.5	1,222	0.5
Sikh	70	<0.1	132	0.1
Buddhism	371	0.2	468	0.2
Other religion	406	0.2	589	0.2
No religion	36,169	16.1	60,507	25.0
Religion not stated	12,494	5.6	11,273	4.7
Total	224,897	100.00%	242,088	100.00%

=== Other demographic statistics ===
As of the 2011 UK census, the borough of Oldham had a population of 224,897.

Of the 89,703 households in Oldham, 56.6% of those aged 16 and over either live as a couple, are married, in a civil partnership or co-habiting, in line with the national average. A relatively high proportion of 9.3% of people are separated or divorced compared with England (8.6%) but in line with Greater Manchester (9.2%).

The population density is higher in Oldham (15.8 people per hectare) than in England (4.1) although it is lower than that for Greater Manchester (21).

Females continue to make up over half (51%) of Oldham's population, which is comparable to Greater Manchester, North West and national figures (50.6%, 50.9%, 50.8% respectively). Oldham has a younger age structure than England, with under 16s making up 22.4% of the population in Oldham compared with 18.9% nationally. People aged 75 and over make up 6.5% of Oldham's population compared with 7.8% of England's population.

Despite improvements in school and college outcomes, the proportion of residents with degree-level qualifications (18.6%) has fallen further behind national rates (27.4%). The proportion of residents with no qualifications has dropped and the gap between Oldham and England has narrowed to 29.6% with no academic qualifications in 2011 compared to 37.7% ten years earlier.

The rise of the middle classes in Oldham has reflected the wider national trend, roughly steady from 1841 until 1921 and then increasing almost exponentially until 2001. However, the proportion of middle-class people was always 5–10% below the national average. Over the same period, the proportion of working class people in Oldham decreased steadily from 60% in 1841 to 23% 1991; since then there has been an increase in the percentage of working-class people to 34%. This was roughly the same pattern as the national averages, however Oldham has a greater proportion of working-class people than the whole of England. In the 2007/2008 financial year, the crime rates in Oldham were broadly similar to the national averages. However, the number of theft from a vehicle offences and theft of a vehicle per 1,000 of the population was 10.6 and 4.5 compared to the English national average of 6.9 and 2.7 respectively.

=== Population change ===
The table below details the population change since 1801, including the percentage change since the last available census data. Although the Metropolitan Borough of Oldham has only existed 1974, figures have been generated by combining data from the towns, villages, and civil parishes that would later be constituent parts of the borough.

Population change in Oldham since 1801
Year	1801	1811	1821	1831	1841	1851	1861	1871	1881	1891
Population	41,471	52,955	59,615	84,490	66,873	77,350	117,797	158,244	198,691	233,445
% change	–	+27.8	+12.5	+41.7	−20.9	+15.7	+52.3	+34.3	+25.6	+17.5
Source: Vision of Britain

Population change in Oldham since 1901
Year	1901	1911	1921	1931	1941	1951	1961	1971	1981	1991	2001
Population	244,138	255,322	250,794	246,353	234,901	223,982	224,005	224,071	219,462	219,613	217,393
% change	+4.6	+4.6	−1.8	−1.8	−4.6	−4.6	+0.01	+0.03	−2.1	+0.1	−1.0
Source: Vision of Britain

== Economy ==
Oldham compared
2001 UK Census	Oldham	Greater Manchester	England
Population of working age	152,602	1,805,315	35,532,091
Full-time employment	40.7%	40.3%	40.8%
Part-time employment	11.6%	11.3%	11.8%
Self employed	6.8%	6.7%	8.3%
Unemployed	3.7%	3.5%	3.3%
Retired	13.0%	13.0%	13.5%

The average gross weekly income in the borough of Oldham is £297; not only is this below the national average but it is the lowest of Greater Manchester's ten boroughs. Environmental technologies and life science industries have been identified as growth industries in Greater Manchester and are concentrated in Oldham as well as Bolton, Manchester, and Tameside. Out of the ten metropolitan boroughs in Greater Manchester, the average house prices in Oldham are seventh highest, 15% below the average for the county.

At the 2001 census, Oldham had 152,602 residents aged 16 to 74. Of these people, 2.1% were students with jobs, 3.9% students without jobs, 6.7% looking after home or family, 7.7% permanently sick or disabled and 3.8% economically inactive for other reasons.

In 2001, of 92,777 residents of Oldham in employment, the industry of employment was 20.4% retail and wholesale, 20.3% manufacturing, 10.7% health and social work, 9.2% property and business services, 7.5% education, 7.1% construction, 6.7% transport and communications, 5.0% public administration and defence, 4.6% hotels and restaurants, 3.6% finance, 0.8% energy and water supply, 0.5% agriculture, and 3.7% other. This was roughly in line with national figures, although the proportion of jobs in agriculture was below the national average of 1.5% and the rates of people working in the areas of finance and property were below the national averages of 4.8% and 13.2 respectively; the proportion of people working in retail and wholesale was above the national average of 16.7%, and much higher than the national average of 14.8% for people working in manufacturing.

== Education ==
There are a total of 107 schools in Oldham. This includes 86 primary schools, 15 secondary schools, 5 special schools and 1 independent grammar school. In 2007, the Oldham LEA was ranked 122nd out of 148 in the country—and 8th in Greater Manchester—based on the percentage of pupils attaining at least 5 A*-C grades at GCSE including maths and English (35.4% compared with the national average of 45.8%).

In June 2014 the Oldham Education and Skills Commission was launched, chaired by former Education Secretary Estelle Morris. This 12-month inquiry is to review Oldham's classrooms from 0 to 19 years and aims at raising standards and aspirations so that every child can achieve their full potential. It will report findings in June 2015.

== Landmarks ==
There were 11 Grade II* listed buildings, and 524 Grade II in the Metropolitan Borough of Oldham, and thirty-six Conservation Areas. Although the borough has no Grade I listed buildings, it does have the second highest number of Grade II buildings in Greater Manchester after Manchester. The listed buildings range from former weavers' cottages in Saddleworth to some of the large former cotton mills in the West of the borough through to fine civic buildings such as the Old Town Hall in Oldham town centre.

Oldham has two of Greater Manchester's 38 Scheduled Monuments. Castleshaw Roman fort was built in 79 AD and was one of a chain of forts built along the route connecting the fortresses at Chester (Deva Victrix) and York (Eboracum). It is one of only two known Roman forts in Greater Manchester, the other is at Manchester (Mamucium). Oldham's other Scheduled Monuments is a Bronze Age bowl barrow in Saddleworth. Also in the borough are five of Greater Manchester's Sites of Special Scientific Interest, they are a section of Dark Peak, the Ladcastle and Den Quarries, the Lowside Brickworks, the Rochdale Canal, and part of the South Pennine Moors.

Alexandra Park status on the Register of Historic Parks and Gardens of special historic interest in England was upgraded in 2013 from Grade II to Grade II* due to the large number of listed statues and buildings in the park. It is one of only 30 parks and gardens to receive the award in the North West and the only open space in Oldham to receive the distinction. Alexandra Park has also been a Green Flag Award winner. It was reported in March 2014 that within the year the Grade II-listed Old Town Hall would be transformed into an entertainment complex with a cinema and restaurants in Oldham town centre. A 360-degree virtual tour of the building was put online before restoration work began as part of a wider project to bring some of Oldham's civic buildings to life on Google Streetview.

== Transport ==
There are two railway lines that serve places in the Oldham borough; one is the main line service running between Huddersfield and Manchester, with Greenfield railway station the only station served by this line in the borough, and the only railway station within the borough. The other line is the main line service running between Manchester and Leeds via Halifax and Rochdale, with Mills Hill railway station (in the borough of Rochdale, and the most used station of the 3 mentioned) serving North Chadderton and Mills Hill, and Moston railway station (in the borough of Manchester) serving South Chadderton and Hollinwood.

A former railway line, the Oldham Loop Line has been converted to be part of the Manchester Metrolink light rail network. Oldham & Rochdale Line services serve Derker, Shaw & Crompton, Oldham Mumps, Freehold, South Chadderton, Hollinwood and Failsworth.

There are many bus services running in the Oldham borough. The main bus operator is Stagecoach Manchester on behalf of TfGM’s Bee Network, whose depot is based in Oldham at Wallshaw Street, which is located at Oldham Mumps Bridge.

The Metrolink extension, which was completed in 2014, was seen as crucial to regeneration plans for Oldham town centre and to change the nature of what it offers to residents, investors, and visitors. It offers good connectivity to Manchester city centre and beyond. Trams run directly to Manchester Victoria in under 30 minutes and onwards to national networks, and also to Rochdale railway station and town centre.

Oldham bus station provides a transport hub at the heart of the town centre. Combined with a network of bus corridors the services include express bus services every town minutes into Manchester city centre. The Metrolink network also extends to Manchester Airport which has direct flights to more than 200 destinations and is also only a 30-minute drive from Oldham.

== Twin towns ==
The Metropolitan Borough of Oldham has formal twinning arrangements with three European places: Each was originally twinned with a place within the Metropolitan Borough boundaries prior to its creation in 1974.

Country	Place	County / District / Region / State	Originally twinned with	Date
Germany	Landsberg am Lech	Bayern	Failsworth Urban District	1974
Germany	Geesthacht	Schleswig-Holstein	Chadderton Urban District	1966
Slovenia	Kranj	Upper Carniola	County Borough of Oldham	1961

== Freedom of the Borough ==
The following people and military units have received the Freedom of the Borough of Oldham.

=== Individuals ===
- Dame Sarah Lees: 9 November 1909.
- Winston Churchill: 2 April 1941.
- J. R. Clynes: 9 January 1946.
- Sir William Walton: 7 December 1960.
- Dame Eva Turner: 7 July 1982.
- Sir Norman Stoller: 16 April 2008.
- Michael Meacher: 17 July 2013.
- Nicola White: 7 September 2016.
- Frank Rothwell: 18 March 2021.
- Matthew Walls: 8 September 2021.
- Kevin Sinfield: 20 March 2023.

=== Military Units ===
- 41st (Oldham) Royal Tank Regiment (TA): 3 March 1954.
- 75 Engineer Regiment (Volunteers): 13 June 1999.

== See also ==
- List of people from Oldham
