= Prestwich-cum-Oldham =

Ecclesiastical parish in England

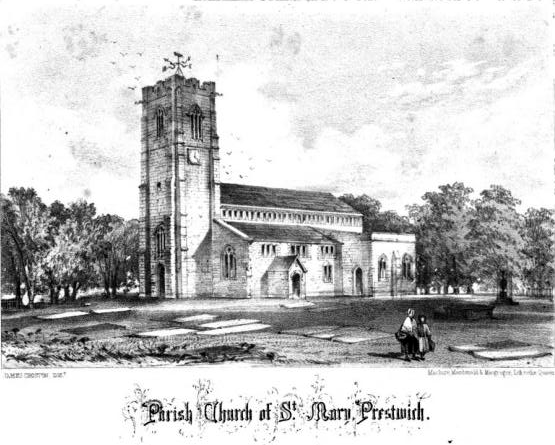
- Church of St Mary the Virgin, Prestwich

- Area
- 21,625 acres (87.51 km^{2})
- Population
  - 1851: 94,470
  - 1861: 117,961
- History
  - Created: High Middle Ages
  - Abolished: 20th century
  - Succeeded by: Prestwich; Oldham (parishes)
- Status: Ecclesiastical parish
  - HQ: Church of St Mary the Virgin, Prestwich
- Subdivisions
  - Type: Townships
  - Units: Alkrington, Chadderton, Crompton, Great Heaton, Little Heaton, Oldham, Pilkington, Prestwich, Royton, Tonge

Prestwich-cum-Oldham (also known as Prestwich with Oldham) was an ancient ecclesiastical parish of the hundred of Salford, within the historic county boundaries of Lancashire, England. With the Parish Church of St Mary the Virgin, Prestwich as its centre, this parish encompassed a total of ten townships, and within them, several smaller chapelries.

Prestwich-cum-Oldham was divided into two non-contiguous sections: the townships of Great Heaton, Little Heaton, Pilkington, and Prestwich on the west; Alkrington, Tonge, Chadderton, Crompton, Oldham and Royton on the east. The parish of Middleton divided these two portions of Prestwich-cum-Oldham from north to south. The parish covered 21,625 acres (87.51 km^{2}) and was noted in 1851 to have a population of 94,470, and again in 1861, to have 117,987.

== History ==
The parish of Prestwich-cum-Oldham has "no united history", and instead was a loose affiliation of rural townships between the South Pennines and West Pennine Moors that had one early-medieval church building between them. Prestwich-cum-Oldham traces its existence to the colony of priests whose presence gave Prestwich its name, as well as tithes, levies and terms of land-tenure related to the ancient Royal Manor of Tottington, a unit used for governance in the manorial system that spanned most of the territory. Stretching for 13 miles (21 km) from east to west from the High Middle Ages onwards, Prestwich-cum-Oldham was probably larger in extent in earlier times; documents suggest an ecclesiastical connection with Radcliffe and Middleton. Manorialism in the parish was comparatively weak when compared nationally; ruling families were either non-resident or of "only local importance". An exception was the Pilkingtons, from the western portion of the parish, who ranked "among the great families of the county". Their military allegiance to Richard III and the House of York during the Wars of the Roses, though, brought about their overthrow in the late-15th century.

The rector of Prestwich-cum-Oldham "was at first reluctantly compliant and then an avowed opponent" of the Elizabethan Religious Settlement of 1559. There is, though, little other evidence of opposition to the English Reformation and the established church. Nevertheless, it is one of only a few parishes in England in which any resistance occurred; there was a show of popular support for the abolition of the Book of Common Prayer and Episcopal polity in favour of Presbyterian polity supported by presbyters in the parish of Manchester. By 1662, the rector of Prestwich-cum-Oldham complied with Anglicanism, but the curate of Oldham, St Mary's was expelled for preaching nonconformism; chapels at Stand and Greenacres span virtually the whole history of non-conformity in the United Kingdom, as does a Quaker meeting-house at Royton.

The parish remained comparatively rural until the Industrial Revolution; some townships, such as Royton, had primitive domestic manufactories and traded goods at the markets in Rochdale and Manchester. The introduction of the factory system to Oldham, Chadderton, Crompton and Royton led to the demise of arable land via rapid urbanisation and industrialisation. This gave rise to the eastern portion as the dominant partner of the parish, despite it being under the authority of the church at Prestwich.

Objections to Prestwich's dominance of the parish existed from an early time; there had been a chapel of ease at Crompton since at least the early 16th century but, due to ecclesiastical arrangements in Prestwich-cum-Oldham, the inhabitants were obliged to contribute money towards Oldham Church, which in turn had obligation to the mother Church of St Mary the Virgin at Prestwich. On several occasions during the 15th and 16th centuries, the Archdeacon of the Chester had to intervene because Crompton's inhabitants refused to contribute monies towards holy bread and candles used at Prestwich.

The Parish of Prestwich-cum-Oldham was dissolved in the 20th century.

== Churches and rituals ==
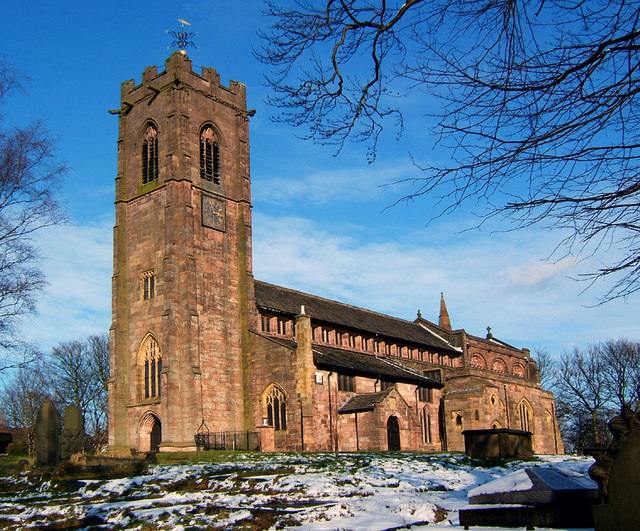
The Church of St Mary the Virgin, Prestwich was the parish church of Prestwich-cum-Oldham, used for baptisms, marriages and burials. It is one of the Grade I listed buildings in Greater Manchester.

Prestwich-cum-Oldham lay within the Diocese of Lichfield until 1541, when this diocese was divided and Prestwich-cum-Oldham became part of the Diocese of Chester. This in turn was divided in 1847 when the present Diocese of Manchester was created.

Many of Prestwich-cum-Oldham's townships had no medieval church of their own. For baptisms, marriages and burials, the people had to travel to St Mary's, Prestwich, or else churches that lay outside the parish boundaries, such as St Leonard's, Middleton. Oldham, though remaining nominally a chapelry into the 20th century, effectively secured independence for the eastern portion of Prestwich-cum-Oldham.

== Constituent areas ==
Prestwich-cum-Oldham comprised ten townships during the greater part of its history. These were not static, and changed according to the construction of churches and chapels and increases in population. Similarly, Prestwich-cum-Oldham was later split into two separate parishes of Prestwich and Oldham.

The area of the whole is 22,022½ acres. The geology of the entire parish is represented by the Coal Measures, and on the eastward side of a line drawn from High Crompton to Greenacres, of the Lower Coal Measures or Gannister Beds.

Parish	Township	Area (In 1911)	Notes	Ref(s).
Prestwich-cum-Oldham	Alkrington	797 acres (3.23 km^{2})		
Prestwich-cum-Oldham	Chadderton	3,138 acres (12.70 km^{2})		
Prestwich-cum-Oldham	Crompton	2,864.5 acres (1,159.2 ha)		
Prestwich-cum-Oldham	Great Heaton	875 acres (3.54 km^{2})		
Prestwich-cum-Oldham	Little Heaton	532 acres (2.15 km^{2})		
Prestwich-cum-Oldham	Oldham	4,665 acres (18.88 km^{2})		
Prestwich-cum-Oldham	Pilkington	5,469 acres (22.13 km^{2})		
Prestwich-cum-Oldham	Prestwich	1,917.5 acres (776.0 ha)		
Prestwich-cum-Oldham	Royton	1,372 acres (5.55 km^{2})	The suburb of Thornham formed its own township, and lay within the parish of Middleton.	
Prestwich-cum-Oldham	Tonge	392 acres (1.59 km^{2})		

=== Daughter parishes ===
Prestwich-cum-Oldham was split into some forty-one daughter parishes, which can be found at The Prestwich Guide - History.

== See also ==
- Prestwich (UK Parliament constituency)
