= Royton Town Hall =

Municipal building in Royton, Greater Manchester, England

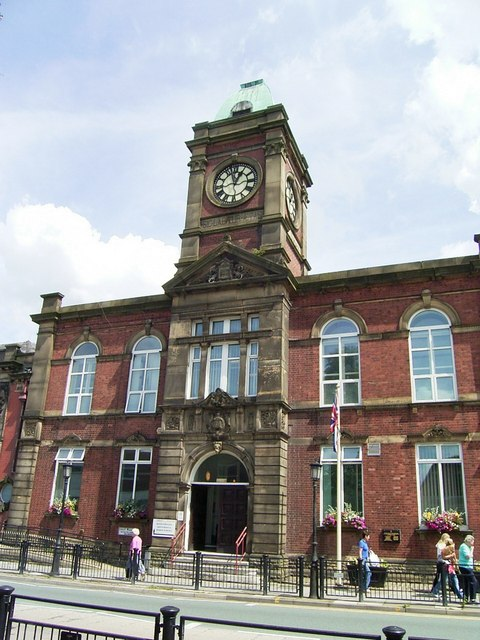
- Royton Town Hall

- Shown in Greater Manchester
- 53.5663°N 2.1223°W
- Location: Rochdale Road, Royton

History
- Built: 1880

Site notes
- Architectural style: Victorian style

Royton Town Hall is a municipal building in Rochdale Road, Royton, Greater Manchester, England. The town hall was the headquarters of Royton Urban District Council.

== History ==
After population growth associated with the increasing number of cotton mills in the town, the local board of health, which had been formed in 1863, decided to procure municipal offices for the area: the site they selected on Rochdale Road had previously formed part of Royton Hall Park.

The new building, which was designed in the Victorian style, was built in red brick with stone dressings at a cost of £7,000 and was officially opened by the first chairman of local board of health, James Ashworth, in September 1880. The design involved a symmetrical main frontage with five bays facing onto Rochdale Road; the central bay, which was built of stone and slightly projected forward, featured a round headed doorway on the ground floor flanked by pilasters supporting an entablature bearing the town's coat of arms; there was an eight-light window on the first floor and a pediment above with a clock tower at roof level. The other bays contained mullion windows on the ground floor and round headed windows on the first floor. The clock, which was designed and manufactured by Gillett and Bland, and the bell were a gift from Dr and Mrs John Kershaw, who also financed the local cottage hospital.

The clock tower was inscribed on three sides with Latin mottos: "Tempus Fugit" (time flies), "Sic Labitur Aetas" (so the years pass by) and "Finem Respice" (have regards to the end). The clock face on the east side, which faced Shaw and Crompton, was designed so as to be much smaller than the ones on the other three sides. When the Church of Holy Trinity at Shaw was constructed in 1869, it had no clock on the western facade of its clock tower, which faced Royton. According to the Royton Local History Society, a local story emerged that the reduced clock face size on the town hall was retaliation against the design of the church at Shaw.

On 26 November 1884, a gangmaster, who was protesting at those provisions of the Factory Acts that prohibited children under 10 years old from working in mills, placed a gunpowder-based explosive device in a cellar underneath the town hall. The device detonated and, although there were no casualties, windows and doors were blown off. The building became the headquarters of Royton Urban District Council when it was formed in 1894.

The building continued to serve as a meeting place for Royton Urban District Council for much of the 20th century but ceased to be the local seat of government after the enlarged Oldham Council was formed in 1974. Since then, apart from some space used by the council's local district team and some space leased out to Greater Manchester Police, the building has been empty and deteriorating. In September 2017, Oldham Council announced plans to refurbish the town hall: the proposed works involved moving the library from an adjacent building into the ground floor of the town hall. Then, in January 2020, council sought bidders for the contract, which was estimated to be worth £2.4 million, to carry out the works.
