= A627(M) motorway =

Motorway in England

A627(M)
- A627(M) highlighted in blue
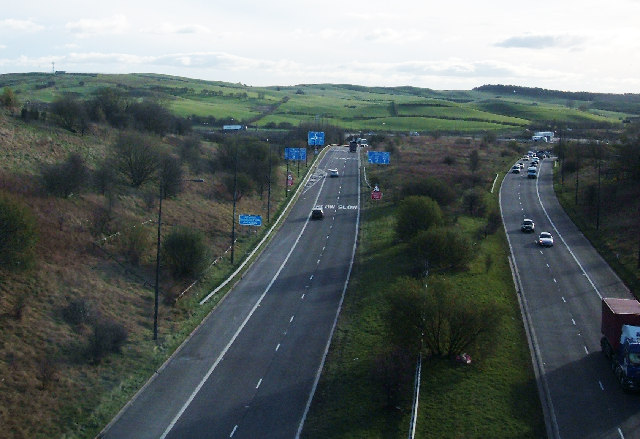
- Looking towards the M62 junction

Route information
- Maintained by National Highways
- Length: 3.5 mi (5.6 km)
- Existed: 1972–present

Major junctions
- North end: Rochdale
- A663 road J1 ->A627 road J3 ->M62 motorway A664 road
- South end: Chadderton

Location
- Country: United Kingdom

Road network
- Roads in the United Kingdom; Motorways; A and B road zones
← A404(M)	→ A74(M)

The A627(M) is a motorway that runs between Chadderton and Rochdale in Greater Manchester, England. It is 3.5 miles (5.6 km) long and connects the two towns to the M62. It opened in 1972.

== Route ==
Heading north, the road starts as a two-lane dual carriageway on the A663 at Chadderton. It turns sharply left and passes west of Royton. It continues to its next junction, where it has a 1-mile (1.6 km) spur. Although signed as the A627(M), a map exists showing it as the A6138(M). After this junction it gains a third lane, before reaching a roundabout at the M62 junction 20. This junction has been designed to accommodate a future flyover. After crossing the roundabout, the route continues as a dual two-lane route for another 1 mi (1.6 km) before turning sharp right to reach its terminal crossroads.

== Junctions ==
Note: motorway has no junction numbers

A627(M) motorway junctions
Northbound exits	Junction	Southbound exits
Lower Place, Milnrow A664; Rochdale, Sudden (A58)	Terminus	Start of motorway
Bolton, Manchester M62; Leeds, Hull M62	M62 J20	Leeds, Hull M62; Bolton, Manchester M62
Castleton, Middleton (A664)		Castleton, Middleton (A664)
Start of motorway		Oldham A627; Royton, Shaw A663
Start of motorway		Road continues as A663 towards Manchester and Failsworth

== See also ==
- List of motorways in the United Kingdom
