= Great Heaton =

Former civil parish in Salford, England

Coordinates: 53.53°N 2.25°W

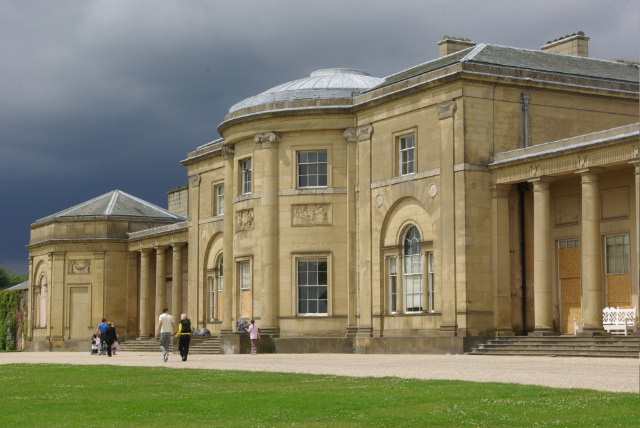
- Heaton Hall

- Location within Greater Manchester
- Metropolitan county: Greater Manchester
- Region: North West
- Country: England
- Sovereign state: United Kingdom
- Police: Greater Manchester
- Fire: Greater Manchester
- Ambulance: North West

Great Heaton (also known as Over Heaton and Heaton Reddish) is a former civil parish, it was and hundred of Salford, in Lancashire (now in Greater Manchester), England. It was occupied land between Prestwich and Manchester, near Heaton Park.

It formed part of the "Manchester poor law Union", 1841–50, but in 1850 was included in "Prestwich poor law Union". It should not be confused with Heaton township, near Bolton, or Heaton Norris township, between Manchester and Stockport. Great Heaton was formerly a township in the parish of Prestwich, in 1866 Great Heaton became a separate civil parish, Following the Local Government Act 1894 it was dissolved and its area divided between Middleton and Prestwich parishes and became part of the Municipal Borough of Middleton and Prestwich Urban District.

In 1903 the Heaton Park area became part of the city of Manchester.
