= Tandle Hill =

Country park in Greater Manchester, England

Coordinates: 53.574°N 2.144°W

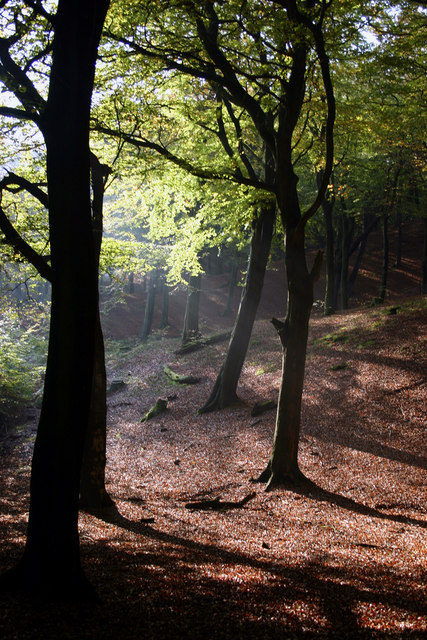
Beech woodland in Tandle Hill

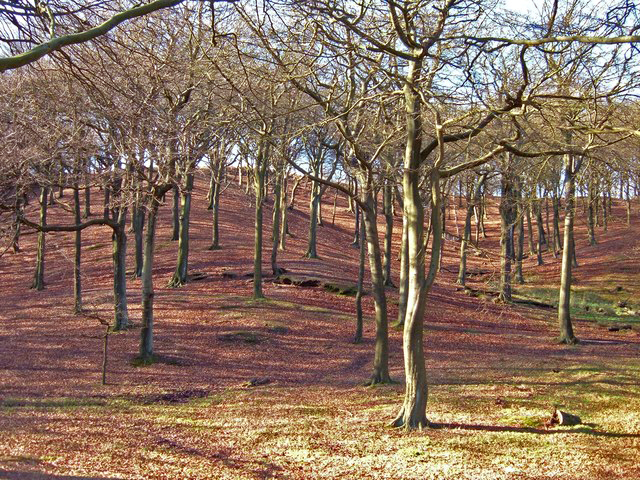
Scenery in Tandle Hill Country Park

Tandle Hill Country Park is a country park in Royton, Greater Manchester, England. It consists of approximately 110 acres (45 ha), a combination of beech woodland and open grassland. The park contains a countryside centre (opened in 1994), picnic areas, children's play area and numerous trails and paths into the surrounding area. Two countryside rangers are based at the countryside centre. In fine weather conditions, it offers views of Manchester and the Welsh mountains.

== History of the Park ==
Tandle Hill was originally part of the township of Thornham – part of the extensive parish of Middleton. It was used as a meeting place for radicals in the 19th century. In the period leading up to the Peterloo massacre it was said that it had been used by radicals for practising marching and drilling. The beech woodland was planted to prevent this happening again and the hill became a hunting park and private game reserve as part of the Thornham Estate. It was sold in 1861 and came into the ownership of Joseph Milne, whose wife later sold the park to Norris Bradbury, a Royton councillor. Bradbury gifted the park to the people of Royton in 1919 as a peace offering at the end of the First World War. A granite marker stands near the Oozewood entrance to the park, and its inscription reads:

Tandle Hill Park and Woods. These grounds are the gift of Norris Bradbury Esq J.P. of Tynwald Mount, Shaw Road Royton as a thank offering for peace after the Great European War 1914–1919. 6th September 1919.

Tandle Hill was formally designated as a country park on 1 July 1971.

== War memorial ==
The war memorial commemorating the men of Royton who died during the First World War stands at the highest point in the park, and was unveiled on 22 October 1921 by the Earl of Derby. Originally the memorial, which is constructed from Portland stone, bore plaques listing the fallen and a bronze statue. The original plaques were stolen in 1969, and replacements were later installed in the grounds of St Paul's, Royton.

== Cultural references ==
Tandle Hill is mentioned in one of the Alan Partridge shows for BBC Radio 4. Alan recalls ascending the hill during a cross-country run. Partridge's creator Steve Coogan grew up in Middleton, though Alan himself was supposedly from Norwich. Coogan attended Cardinal Langley Grammar School, Middleton, where cross country runs occasionally saw pupils being sent to the monument and back.

Tandle Hill is mentioned in the lyrics of "Mill Boys" on the album Everyone Is Everybody Else by Barclay James Harvest.

The album cover Script of the Bridge by The Chameleons has a sketch, by the band's guitarist Reg Smithies, of Tandle Hill, and the song "View From a Hill" relates to an experience singer/songwriter Mark Burgess experienced on Tandle Hill.
