= Oldham Parish Church =

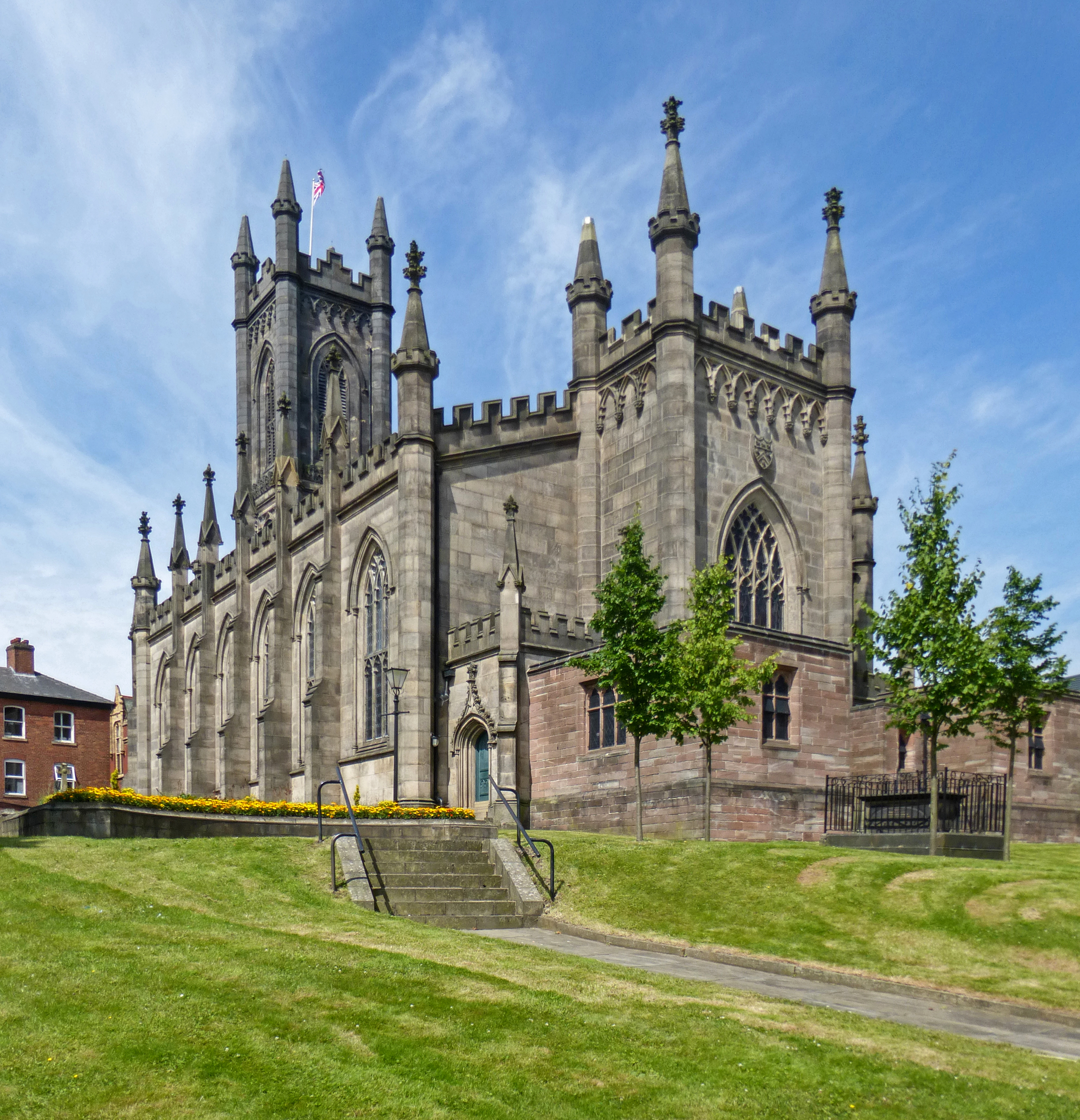

- Location within Greater Manchester
- 53.5426°N 2.1111°W
- OS grid reference: SD 92729 05112
- Location: Oldham, Greater Manchester
- Country: England
- Denomination: Church of England
- Website: www.facebook.com/OldhamParishChurch/

History
- Status: Active
- Founded: 1280

Architecture
- Functional status: Parish Church
- Architect: Richard Lane
- Style: Gothic Revival
- Completed: 1830

Administration
- Province: York
- Diocese: Manchester
- Parish: Oldham

Clergy
- Vicar(s): Revd Daniel Burton; Associate Vicar Revd Canon Jean Hurlston

The Church of St Mary with St Peter, commonly known as Oldham Parish Church, is the Church of England parish church of Oldham in Greater Manchester, England. It forms part of the Diocese of Manchester, and is a grade II* listed building.

A church building had existed on the site since 1280. During this time, a small chapel stood on the site to serve the local townships of Oldham, Chadderton, Royton and Crompton. This was later replaced by an Early English Gothic Church in the 15th century. With the coming of the Industrial Revolution, the population of Oldham increased at a rapid rate (from under 2,000 in 1714, to over 32,000 by 1831). The rapid growth of the local population warranted that the building be rebuilt into the current structure. Though the budget was originally agreed at £5,000, the final cost of building was £30,000, one third of which was spent on the crypt structure. Alternative designs by Sir Charles Barry, the designer of the Palace of Westminster, although now regarded by some as superior, were rejected. In 1805 the churchyard was enlarged and nearby Church Lane, Oldham became a cul-de-sac severing an ancient route through the town. The previous continuance of the road (Church Street) was lowered by 6 feet and became an extension of the recently created Church Terrace.

The church its present form, dates from 1830 and was designed in the Gothic Revival Style by Richard Lane, a Manchester-based architect. It has been designated by English Heritage as a Grade II* listed building. It was linked with St Mary's Church in Prestwich and together the sites were principal churches of the ancient ecclesiastical parish of Prestwich-cum-Oldham.

The reredos tryptich behind high altar was created by the designer Edward Stanley Watkins in 1908. It depicts Christ in Majesty in a medieval style, depicting leading historical figures of the church in England. He also designed the triptych in the side chapel in north aisle.

The peal of twelve bells was cast in 1922 by John Taylor & Co of Loughborough. An additional flat 6th was cast in 1978. The church also retains its original bell, cast in 1722 by Abraham Rudhall II of Gloucester.

== See also ==
- Listed buildings in Oldham
- List of churches in Greater Manchester
- History of Oldham
