= Municipal Borough of Middleton =

Former local government area in the UK

Coordinates: 53°33′N 2°12′W

Middleton
- Area
  - 1911: 4,775 acres (19.32 km^{2})
  - 1961: 5,173 acres (20.93 km^{2})
- Population
  - 1901: 25,178
  - 1971: 53,515
- History
  - Created: 1886
  - Abolished: 1974
  - Succeeded by: Metropolitan Borough of Rochdale
- Status: Municipal borough
- Government
  - HQ: Middleton Town Hall, Gas Street 1886 - 1925; Parkfield House 1925 - 1974
  - Motto: Fortis in Arduis (strong in difficulties)

The Municipal Borough of Middleton was, from 1886 to 1974, a municipal borough in the administrative county of Lancashire, England, coterminous with the town of Middleton.

== Civic history ==
By the nineteenth century the neighbouring townships of Middleton and Tonge formed a single town. The townships, separated by the River Irk, lay in different parishes and local administration was in the hands of constables appointed by the Lord of the manor.

The Middleton and Tonge Improvement Act 1861 (24 & 25 Vict. c. c), a local act of Parliament, established Middleton and Tonge Improvement Commissioners under the chairmanship of cotton spinner Edmund Howarth to provide public services in the area. One of its first acts was to take over responsibility for the Middleton Gas Company, formed by the Middleton Gas Company Act 1846 (9 & 10 Vict. c. viii). In 1879 the improvement commissioners district was enlarged to take in Alkrington and parts of Hopwood and Thornham.

Following a petition by the inhabitant householders of the improvement commissioners district, a charter of incorporation was granted on 21 July 1886, constituting the area as the Municipal Borough of Middleton.

The borough was enlarged in 1894 by the addition of parts of the townships of Great Heaton and Little Heaton, and the boundaries with neighbouring districts were adjusted in 1933 by a County Review Order.

The borough was abolished by the Local Government Act 1972, with its area becoming part of the Metropolitan Borough of Rochdale in the new county of Greater Manchester in 1974.

== Borough council ==
The charter created an elected town council for the borough, consisting of a mayor, six aldermen and eighteen councillors. The borough was divided into three wards, and two councillors were elected for a three-year term in each ward annually. Each ward was also represented by two alderman: half of the aldermanic bench were elected by the council every three years, and they each served for six years. The mayor was elected annually from among the council's membership.

In the early years the borough council appears to have non-political, and elections were rarely contested, with an agreed panel of candidates standing unopposed. In later years the council was broadly Conservative in complexion. Following the Second World War elections were held on party political lines. The Conservative Party had an overall majority until 1957, with Labour, Liberal and Independent councilors in opposition.

In 1957 the size of the borough council was increased from twenty-four to thirty-six. The Labour Party gained control of the enlarged council, and held it until 1960. Apart from one year under no overall control, the administration of the borough alternated between the Conservatives (1960–1963 and 1969–1971) and Labour (1963–1969 and 1972–1974).

== Coat of arms ==
The Mayor, Alderman and Burgesses of Middleton were granted armorial bearings by the College of Arms on 28 January 1877. The blazon of the arms was as follows:

Quarterly per pale nebuly gules and argent on a fesse ermine between a cross patonce of the second in the first quarter a mullet sable pierced of the field in the second a silkworm moth volant in the third and a rock in base thereon a stork in the fourth three sprigs of the cotton tree slipped and fructed all proper, and for a crest on a wreath of the colours upon a mount vert between two boars' heads erect and couped sable a tower proper suspended therefrom by a riband gules an escutcheon Or charged with a lion passant also gules.

The design combined features from the arms of local families with symbols of the town's industries. The basic layout of the shield was based on the arms of Middleton of Middleton Hall: "Quarterly gules and Or in the first a cross flory argent", while the black spur-rowel came from the arms of the Assheton family. The textile industries of Middleton were depicted by the cotton sprigs and silk worm moth. According to the borough council the stork represented "the desire for the increase in population'". The crest above the shield was made up of a tower and lion from the heraldry of the Earls of Middleton between two boars' heads from the arms of another Middleton family.

The borough borrowed the Latin motto of the Middleton Earls: Fortis in Arduis or "strong in difficulties".
