= Moravian Church of the British Province =

Moravian Church in the UK and Ireland

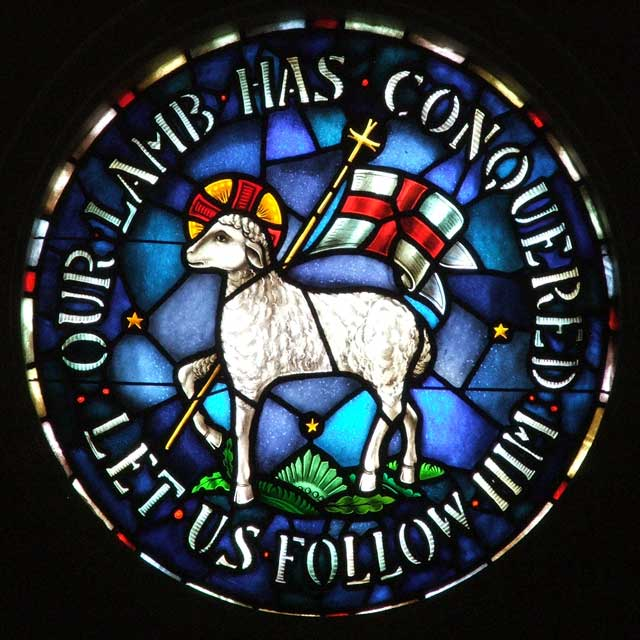
The seal of the Moravian Church

The Moravian Church of the British Province (formally The Moravian Church in Great Britain and Ireland) is part of the worldwide Moravian Church Unity. The Moravian Church in Britain has bishops in apostolic succession.

English Moravian worship uses prayers taken from Anglican, Scottish and Free Church texts, but some practices are distinctive to the Moravian Church.

== History ==
The Moravian Church (Unitas Fratrum) came to England in the early eighteenth century and was recognised by Act of Parliament (Acta Fratrum 1749) as an ancient Protestant Episcopal Church descended from the Bohemian Brethren of the fifteenth century. Under the leadership of Nicolaus Ludwig, Count von Zinzendorf, who in addition to being a German nobleman was a Bishop of the Moravian Church, it took an active part in the great Evangelical Revival of the eighteenth century and was a pioneer of modern Protestant missionary work (1732). Mary Stonehouse was adopted by the founder as his daughter and she donated and then left a substantial fortune to the early church.

== Organisation ==
=== Headquarters ===
Moravian Church House, 5–7 Muswell Hill, London N10 3TJ, England.

=== Districts and congregations ===
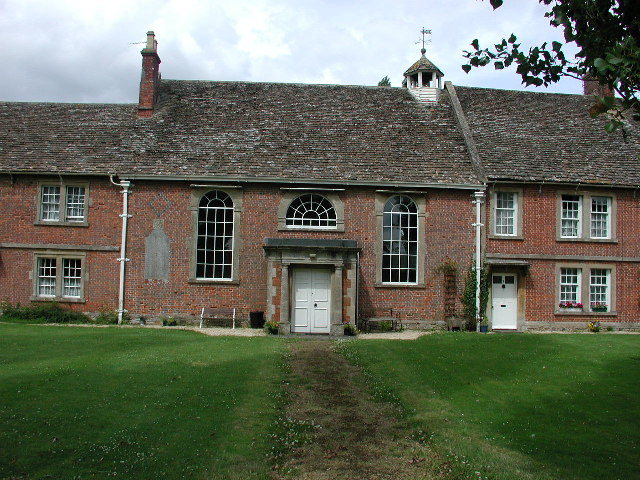
A Moravian church in East Tytherton

- Eastern District: Bedford Queen's Park Free Church; Bedford St. Luke's (Moravian/URC) (closed); London, Fetter Lane; London, Harlesden (Moravian/URC); London, Harold Road; London, Hornsey; Priors Marston (closed); Woodford Halse (closed).
- Irish District: Ballinderry; Belfast, Cliftonville; Belfast, University Road; Gracehill; Kilwarlin.
- Lancashire District: Dukinfield; Fairfield; Salem (closed 2022); Royton (formerly Westwood); Wheler Street (closed).
- Midlands District: Hall Green United Community Church (formerly Sparkhill United Church) (Moravian/URC); Leicester; Leominster; Ockbrook.
- Western District: Bath, Coronation Avenue; Bath, Weston Free Church; Brockweir; Kingswood (Moravian/URC); Malmesbury (closed); Swindon; Tytherton.
- Yorkshire District: Baildon; Fulneck; Gomersal; Horton; Wellhouse; Lower Wyke.

=== Membership ===
In 1999, there were 2,914 members. (Colin Podmore, Moravian Episcopate: A Personal Response, p. 378).

There exists an informative interactive map from 2003 when there were 34 congregations.

By 2016 the membership had fallen to 1,200 in 30 congregations.

=== Societies ===
A Moravian Society is a local body of members and adherents of the Moravian Church, recognised by Synod, which while not forming a congregation, is under the care of a Moravian minister or a duly approved lay worker.

- Stoke Newington – associated with Hornsey congregation.
- Moss Side, Manchester.
- Chepstow – associated with Brockweir congregation.
- Leeds – associated with Fulneck congregation.

=== Other work ===
The diaspora work in the British Province seeks to link non-resident and former members of the Moravian Church with each other and the wider life of the Church.

== Worship ==
From the outset, the Moravian Church has placed a strong emphasis on congregational hymn singing as a form of both worship and learning. One of its early Bishops, Luke of Prague (1460–1528), also encouraged the Church to use Hussite and Catholic liturgies to enrich their worship. Zinzendorf, who renewed the church in the 1720s, has been described as the most original liturgist of Protestant Christianity. The Moravian Church in Britain has continued to be a liturgical church while at the same time allowing free worship as the occasion demands.

=== Moravian Liturgy 1960 ===
==== Liturgy of the Word ====
The Moravian Liturgy 1960 is currently the main authorised book of services. The liturgy of the Word is contained in six Orders of Worship, each one of which produces a service lasting about one hour. The words of introduction consist of texts from Scripture with a response from the congregation. Confession and absolution also follow Scripture closely and in some Orders feature the Ten Commandments, the Lord’s Summary of the Law or the Beatitudes. There is provision for the chanting of psalms and canticles such as the Magnificat and the singing of hymns. Among the canticles is a festal doxology from the 1759 Moravian Liturgy. Many prayers are taken from Anglican, Scottish and Free Church texts but some elements are distinctively Moravian. The First Order is grounded in the Litany compiled by Martin Luther and printed in the Brethren's Hymn Book of 1566. The Sixth Order includes the 'Christ Litany' composed by Zinzendorf.

The Liturgy also includes the Apostles' and Nicene creeds and five 'confessions of faith'. The first of the ‘confessions’ dates from the early days of the Moravian renewal in Germany in the 1720s. This is usually used in the Easter dawn service, commonly held in burial grounds. The Nicene Creed in the Moravian Liturgy does not include the 'filioque' clause, i.e., like the Eastern Orthodox Churches, Moravians believe that the Holy Spirit proceeds from the Father alone and not from 'the Father and the Son'. Linyard and Tovey (1994) do not attach much importance to this but it appears that Zinzendorf accepted the Greek claim that the ‘filioque’ was a relatively late Western addition.

==== Offices of the Church ====
The Offices of the Church in the Liturgy Book include the Lord's Supper, the Lovefeast, the Cup of Covenant, the Thanksgiving of Mothers, Baptism of Infants, Baptism of Adults & Confirmation, the Reception of Communicants, the Ordination of Ministers, Solemnization of Marriage and Burial of the Dead.

The liturgy for the Lord's Supper or holy communion shows a Moravian characteristic in that prayers are addressed not to God the Father but to Christ. The communion prayer is a combination of Anglican and Presbyterian material. At the heart of the service is a structure taken from Luther’s 1526 Deutsche Messe. After the Minister has recited the Lord’s words of institution, the communion wafers are distributed to worshippers in their seats and consumed together. A verse of meditation on the death of Christ is then sung. The same sequence is repeated with the wine, which is distributed in small glasses. Podmore (1998) reports how impressed observers, including Roman Catholics, were to see up to 300 people taking the sacrament together in solemn stillness and then prostrating themselves. After a hymn and a prayer of thanksgiving, a covenant hymn is sung in which members of the congregation exchange the right hand of fellowship. The service concludes with the Aaronic blessing. In most Moravian congregations in Britain, holy communion is celebrated once a month.

In the New Testament, the Lovefeast was part of the common meal which included the Lord’s Supper. The Lovefeast was spontaneously revived in the Moravian Church on 13 August 1727 when Count Zinzendorf sent some food to sustain people who wished to remain in prayer and singing following a deeply moving communion service in the parish church of Berthelsdorf on his estates in Saxony. Some Moravian congregations in Britain celebrate the Lovefeast with simple refreshments and singing of hymns as a way of preparing for communion.

The Cup of Covenant is a peculiarly Moravian custom. Originating in 1729 as a way of dedicating young men leaving on overseas missions, it involves drinking from a common cup, singing hymns and exchanging the right hand of fellowship.

The rite for the Ordination of Ministers makes provision for the ordination of deacons and presbyters and the consecration of bishops. The Moravian Church has retained a threefold order of ministry since its early days and an unbroken succession of bishops since 1553.

It is noteworthy that the Order for the Burial of the Dead includes a prayer for the repose of the faithful departed, borrowed from the Book of Common Prayer.

==== Special Seasons ====
The Moravian Church observes the seasons of the church year and the 1960 Liturgy includes services for Christmas, Good Friday, Easter, Whitsuntide and Trinity Sunday.

Passion Week is of particular importance. On Palm Sunday the Hosanna Anthem, written by Christian Gregor in 1783, is sung in antiphonal form by males and females. This service begins a week of meetings for readings from the ‘Passion Week and Eastertide’ booklet, which contains a harmony of narrative drawn from all the gospels. On Thursday there is a service of holy communion. The Good Friday Liturgy includes readings from the booklet and singing of hymn verses. The Easter Liturgy, which in the old settlements of the church takes place in the burial grounds early in the morning of Easter Sunday, celebrates the Resurrection of Christ and prays for unbroken fellowship with the faithful departed; and ends in church with a service of holy communion with the Risen Lord.

Christmas is also important to Moravians, who place a special emphasis on the humanity of the Incarnate God. The Hosanna Anthem is sung on Advent Sunday. Closer to Christmas, a Christingle service is held. Now common in many denominations, this service was first held in the Moravian church at Marienborn in Germany in 1747. Each child was presented with a candle decorated with red ribbon to remind them of the birth of Christ ‘who has kindled in each heart a flame’. Nowadays the candle is presented on an orange decorated with frills and sweets to symbolize Christ as the Light of the World. By the light of the candles, the congregation sings Hymn 45, ‘Morning Star, O cheering sight’.

=== Liturgical revision ===
‘Alternative Orders of Worship’ were produced in 1987. These include an Order that integrates the ministry of the Word and Sacrament for holy communion, and a revised First Order which modernizes the language of the ancient litany. The Provincial authorities continue to work on revising both Liturgy and Hymn Book.

=== Hymns ===
The oldest hymn in the Moravian Hymn Book (1960) celebrates the unity and glory of the church: it is number 356, ‘Come, let us all with gladness raise / A joyous song of thanks and praise’ and is a translation of one originally written for the Synod of Lhota in 1467, at which the Bohemian Brethren decided to establish their own priesthood.

Come let us all with gladness raise

== Spirit of the Moravian Church ==
An account of the ethos of the Moravian Church is given by one of its British Bishops, C H Shawe. In a lecture series delivered at the Moravian Theological Seminary in Bethlehem, Pennsylvania, Shawe described the Spirit of the Moravian Church as having five characteristics. These are simplicity, happiness, unintrusiveness, fellowship and the ideal of service.

Simplicity is a focus on the essentials of faith and a lack of interest in the niceties of doctrinal definition. Shawe quotes Zinzendorf's remark that 'The Apostles say: "We believe we have salvation through the grace of Jesus Christ ...." If I can only teach a person that catechism I have made him a divinity scholar for all time'. From this simplicity flow secondary qualities of genuineness and practicality.

Happiness is the natural and spontaneous response to God's free and gracious gift of salvation. Again Shawe quotes Zinzendorf: 'There is a difference between a genuine Pietist and a genuine Moravian. The Pietist has his sin in the foreground and looks at the wounds of Jesus; the Moravian has the wounds in the forefront and looks from them upon his sin. The Pietist in his timidity is comforted by the wounds; the Moravian in his happiness is shamed by his sin'.

Unintrusiveness is based on the Moravian belief that God positively wills the existence of a variety of churches to cater for different spiritual needs. There is no need to win converts from other churches. The source of Christian unity is not legal form but everyone's heart-relationship with the Saviour.

Fellowship is based on this heart-relationship. Shawe says: 'The Moravian ideal has been to gather together kindred hearts ... Where there are "Christian hearts in love united", there fellowship is possible in spite of differences of intellect and intelligence, of thought, opinion, taste and outlook. ... [In Zinzendorf's time] Fellowship meant not only a bridging of theological differences but also of social differences; the artisan and aristocrat were brought together as brothers and sat as equal members on the same committee'.

The ideal of service entails happily having the attitude of a servant. This shows itself partly in faithful service in various roles within church congregations but more importantly in service of the world 'by the extension of the Kingdom of God'. Historically, this has been evident in educational and especially missionary work. Shawe remarks that none 'could give themselves more freely to the spread of the gospel than those Moravian emigrants who, by settling in Herrnhut [i.e., on Count Zinzendorf's estate], had gained release from suppression and persecution'.

== Schools ==
- Fulneck School, Pudsey, West Yorkshire (Closed 2025)
- Ockbrook School, near Derby, Derbyshire (Closed 2021)

== See also ==
- Fetter Lane Society

== Bibliography ==
- British Province of the Moravian Church (1960) The Moravian Liturgy, London: Moravian Book Room
- British Province of the Moravian Church (1969) The Moravian Hymn Book, London: Moravian Book Room
- Church of England & The Moravian Church in Great Britain and Ireland (1996) Anglican-Moravian Conversations: the Fetter Lane Common Statement with essays in Moravian and Anglican history, London: Anglican Council for Christian Unity
- Freeman, Arthur (1998) An Ecumenical Theology of the Heart: the Theology of Count Nicholas Ludwig von Zinzendorf, Bethlehem PA: Moravian Board of Communications
- Hutton, J E (1909) A History of the Moravian Church, London: Moravian Publication Office
- Linyard, Fred, and Tovey, Phillip (1994) Moravian Worship, Nottingham: Grove Books
- Podmore, Colin (1998) The Moravian Church in England 1728–1760, Oxford: Clarendon Press
- Shawe, C H, DD (1977) The Spirit of the Moravian Church, London: Moravian Book Room
