= Dukinfield Moravian Church =

- Dukinfield Moravian Church
- 53.469331°N 2.074123°W
- OS grid reference: SJ 95177 96955
- Location: Dukinfield, Tameside, Greater Manchester
- Country: England
- Denomination: Moravian Church
- Churchmanship: Protestant
- Website: moravian.org.uk

History
- Status: Active

Architecture
- Functional status: Parish church

Administration
- Diocese: British Province of the Moravian Church
- Parish: Dukinfield

Dukinfield Moravian Church was founded in Dukinfield, Cheshire, England in 1755 following a period of evangelistic work in the area by Moravians from 1742. It now stands within the Tameside Metropolitan Borough, Greater Manchester.

== History ==
=== Settlement to 1785 ===
From 1740 evangelists led by one David Taylor had been at work in Lancashire, Cheshire and Derbyshire and an evangelical congregation had been established in Dukinfield. Taylor became acquainted with Revd Benjamin Ingham, Vicar of Ossett in Yorkshire, who was a keen supporter of the Moravian Church. Ingham was an associate of John Wesley from his Oxford days and had encountered the Moravians on Wesley's voyage to America. Ingham recommended that Taylor seek help from the Moravians so in 1742, the Brn George Prosky and David Heckwälder paid Taylor a visit. This meeting initiated work that led to a Moravian Society being formed in 1743. This Society was attached to the parish church but followed Moravian practices for edification and evangelism.

In May 1751 the foundation stone of the first Moravian chapel in Dukinfield was laid on Old Road. This was to serve the Moravian Society. However, following a request from the Society's leader, James Greening, Bishop Johannes von Watteville visited Dukinfield and on 26 April 1755 accepted the Society's request to become a fully fledged congregation of the Moravian Church. At the same time, the Bishop introduced the man chosen to be Dukinfield's Minister, Francis Oakley of St John's College, Oxford.

In the eighteenth century, the Moravian Church had settlements which were largely self-contained communities. The settlements usually had a chapel, a Single Brethren's House, a Single Sisters' House, a Widows' House, schools and an inn. Single members would live, work and worship together in their communal Houses. A settlement might have its own doctor, bakery, shop, farm, shoe makers, glove makers and carpenters. The congregation was organised into Choirs, e.g., the Married Choir, the Single Sisters' Choir, the Great Girls' Choir and the Little Girls' Choir, each of which was a sub-community serving Christ in its own way.

The chapel at Dukinfield was intended to form the centre of such a settlement. A burial ground was purchased. A house near the chapel was handed over to Sr Wyring from Fulneck and her band of ten women and girls for use as the Single Sisters' House. A Brethren's House with five members was begun in rooms belonging to one Alice Brown. In 1758 larger Houses were built and consecrated, the Sisters on the North side of the church and the Brethren on the South. In 1761, a girls' school was started by the Widow Grundy and in 1769 a boys' school was started with ten pupils. In May 1764 the chapel was enlarged and was crowded at its re-opening. At the Easter dawn service in the burial ground on 26 March 1769, a crowd of two thousand people attended; despite the fact that some of the onlookers were drunk, the service proceeded peacefully.

Dukinfield was vigorous in its mission work, establishing preaching stations in Padfield, Hayfield, Bullock Smithy (i.e., Hazel Grove), Mobberley, Macclesfield and Manchester. The work at Mobberley produced some tension with Methodist preachers, for Moravians did not accept the Methodist doctrine that sinners could be sanctified until they became perfect; rather, they would always be sinners requiring grace. Work at Clarksfield in Oldham ultimately led to the creation of Salem Moravian Church in 1825.

With the transfer of the Dukinfield estates to the Astley family, it became impossible to secure the leases needed to expand the Dukinfield Settlement further. Accordingly, the 'Provincial Helper' or superintendent of the Moravian work in Britain, Br Benjamin La Trobe, found new land at Fairfield in Droylsden on a 999-year lease. On 17 May 1785 the Single Brethren moved to the new settlement. On 10 June 1785 the whole of the congregation gathered at Dukinfield for a Farewell Lovefeast and on 15 June the new chapel at Fairfield was consecrated.

=== Dukinfield congregation post 1785 ===
Despite the removal of the settlement to Fairfield, the worship in Dukinfield continued and in July 1788, Br Samuel Watson was sent to serve as Minister. The Sisters' House was re-opened and a girls' boarding school was started in 1792. By 1802, Dukinfield was allowed to have its own communion service again and to elect a committee from the membership to manage its own affairs.

By 1820 the chapel was in a state of disrepair. On 19 May 1826 the foundation stone of a new chapel was laid and this building was opened on 19 November. In 1827 an organ was added at a cost of £110. In 1836 the Minister's House was built at a cost of £326. Gas lighting for the chapel was provided in 1841 at a cost of £15 5s and in the same year a heating stove was installed.

Br Charles E Sutcliffe, who was Minister from 1852 to 1870, was a powerful evangelical preacher and his sermons attracted many new members. The 1826 church building proved inadequate and so on 6 August 1859 the foundation stone of a new chapel was laid by Br Lees of Hey. Many members from Fairfield and Salem also attended this service. On 9 May 1860 the new building was opened. The building had cost £1,120 but by the end of the year both the land purchase and building costs had been fully met. In 1867 a larger organ was placed in a new organ loft over the vestry at a cost of £400. This organ was itself replaced by 1881.

Some Dukinfield Moravians moved to the Westwood area of Oldham and, with others from Salem, became the nucleus of a new congregation there in 1865.

In 1907 the church was renovated. Pews were installed instead of benches. A new boiler was provided at a cost of £350. In 1908 a Provincial Synod was held in the renovated church. Two Anglican Bishops attended this Synod to discuss closer relations with the Moravian Church.

Following the First World War the congregation continued to develop, with a range of social activities such as the Men's Institute, Football Club, Cricket Club, Dramatic Society and Musical Concerts as well as worship and witness.

In 1956, the Dukinfield congregation started a new base on Yew Tree Lane. A chapel was opened there in 1973 and the Old Road site sold.

=== Day School and Br Charles Hindley ===
In 1853 a Day School was created and opened on Easter Monday. This was organised under a Trust Deed which required religious education to be provided by the Moravian Minister. The cost of the school was about £1,500. Most of this money, and the land on which the school was built, was provided or raised by members of the Hindley family, led by Br Charles Hindley.

Br Hindley was Member of Parliament for Ashton from 1835 to 1857. He had been educated at the Moravian school in Fulneck, Yorkshire and had served as a teacher at the Church's academy in Gracehill, Northern Ireland. He had planned to become a Moravian minister but on his older brother's death had to take over the family cotton business. His great achievement in the House of Commons was to pass a Bill reducing the working hours in cotton mills for men, women and children from fifteen hours a day to ten.

The Dukinfield School so strongly supported by the Hindley family proved very successful. In 1866 there were 400 children on the roll. In 1923 the school was handed over to the Borough Education Committee but the church retained access to the building for use as a Sunday School.

=== Explosions ===
Opposite the church there stood a mill belonging to Messrs Tomlins and Bradbury. This was a cause of complaints from the church committee in regard to smoke from a low chimney, which was eventually raised, and noisy workmen who disturbed Sunday services. More serious perhaps was an explosion on 21 September 1854, which threw the mill's steam boiler through the air towards the Minister's House. Had the boiler not turned in mid-air, the house would have been flattened killing the people inside it.

In 1917 an explosion at a nearby ammunition works did £165 worth of damage to church property. Many residents took to farm land in the area, fearing further blasts.

== Ministers ==
- 1740-1742 David Taylor
- 1744-1746 John Hutchins
- 1746-1748 David Heckwalder
- 1748-1752 George Prosky
- 1752-1755 James Greening
- 1755-1756 Francis Oakley
- 1756-1763 George Prosky
- 1763-1764 Samuel Watson
- 1764-1764 Anton Seifferth
- 1764-1768 G Hauptmann
- 1768-1777 Samuel Watson
- 1777-1783 William Jackson
- 1783-1785 John Worthington
- 1785-1788 Served from Fairfield Moravian Settlement
- 1788-1793 Samuel Watson
- 1793-1799 Daniel Cowley
- 1799-1800 Ignatius Traneker
- 1800-1802 Ralph Shufflebottom
- 1802-1804 James Grundy
- 1804-1809 John Caldwell
- 1809-1811 Samuel F Church
- 1811-1824 James La Trobe
- 1824-1826 Thomas Bird
- 1826-1830 Benjamin Beck
- 1830-1833 John Smith
- 1833-1835 G Andreas Cunow
- 1835-1843 Joseph Shawe
- 1843-1845 Charles F Reichel
- 1845-1852 Christian F Hawke
- 1852-1870 Charles E Sutcliffe
- 1870-1873 John D Libbey
- 1873-1881 John W Scandrett
- 1881-1886 Charles B Ellis
- 1886-1896 Robert Hutton
- 1896-1916 William Titterington
- 1916-1920 C Jackson Shawe
- 1920-1925 R E Pritchett
- 1925-1931 S C Neath
- 1931-1932 L G Schofield
- 1932-1935 H P Connor
- 1935-1943 G A Mitchell
- 1943-1946 Handel Hassall
- 1946-1982 Tom McQuillan
- 1982-1993 Dorothy Moreton
- 1993-2003 Richard Ingham
- 2003-2011 Colin McIlwaine
- 2012-2023 Peter M. Gubi, DLitt, PhD, ThD, DMin (Professor)
- 2023-2024 Patsy Holdsworth
- 2025- James Woolford

== Bibliography ==
- Hamilton, J T and Hamilton, K G (1967) History of the Moravian Church: the Renewed Unitas Fratrum 1722-1957, Bethlehem, Pa, and Winston-Salem, NC, Interprovincial Board of Christian Education, Moravian Church in America
- McQuillan, T (1950) Two Hundred Years of Christian Witness: A Brief Account of the Story of the Moravian Church in Dukinfield
- Mellowes, F H (1977) A Short History of Fairfield Moravian Church
- Podmore, C (1998) The Moravian Church in England 1728-1760, Oxford, Clarendon Press
