= 20–23 and 23A Fairfield Square =

Listed buildings in Droylsden, Greater Manchester, England

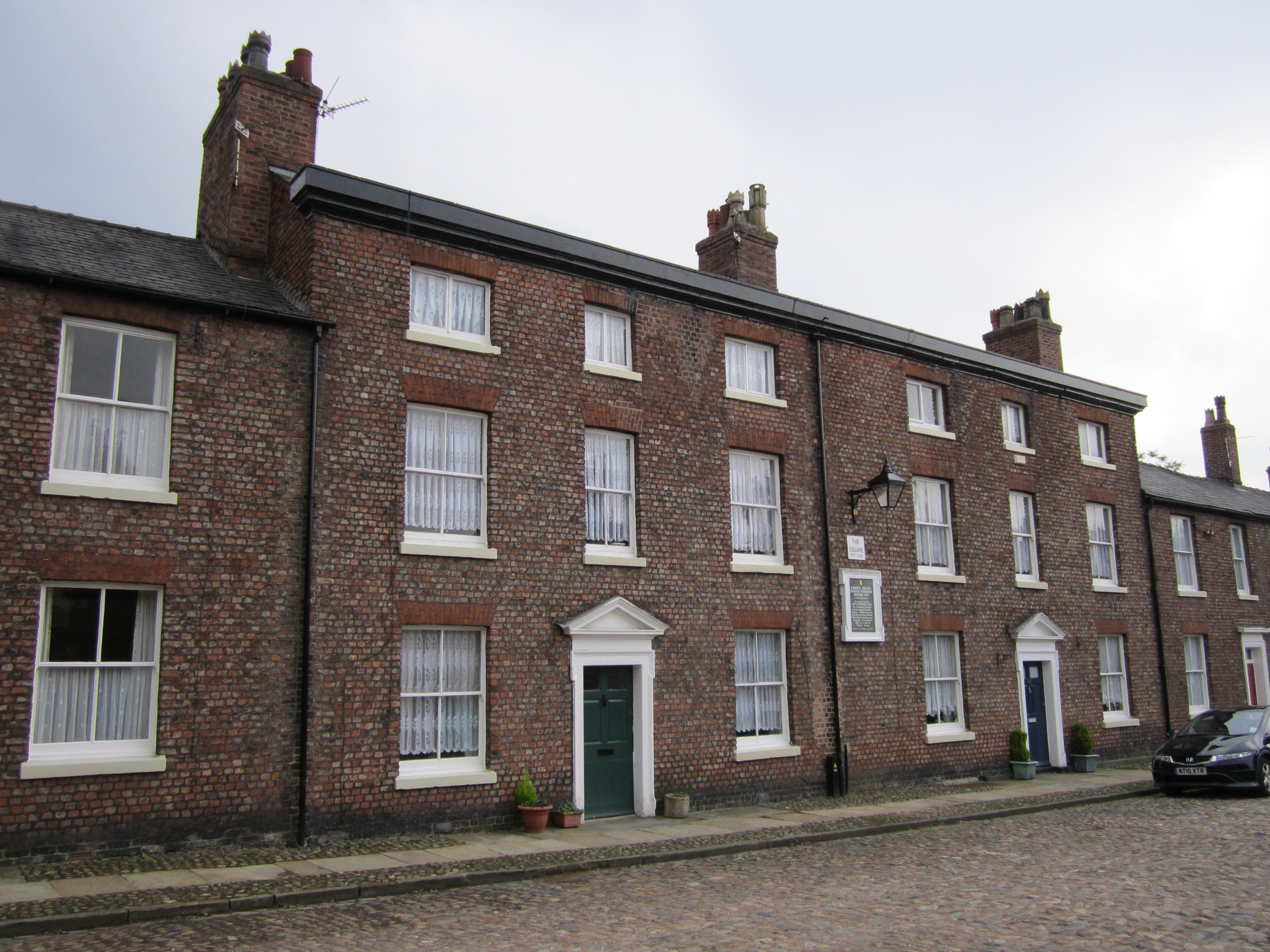
- The houses in 2013

- Location within Greater Manchester

General information
- Location: Fairfield, Droylsden, Greater Manchester, England
- Coordinates: 53.4757°N 2.1498°W
- Year built: 1785; 241 years ago

Listed Building – Grade II*
- Official name: 20–23 and 23A, Fairfield Square
- Designated: 17 November 1966
- Reference no.: 1356489

20–23 and 23A Fairfield Square comprise a range of five historic houses in the Fairfield Moravian Settlement in Droylsden, a town within Tameside, Greater Manchester, England. They are designated as Grade II* listed buildings and form part of the Moravian community established in the late 18th century.

== History ==
The houses were built in 1785 as part of the Fairfield Moravian Settlement, which was founded by members of the Moravian Church who arrived in the area during the mid-18th century. The settlement became an important religious and social community, with weaving forming a key part of its economy. Two of the houses (Nos. 21 and 22) originally incorporated a weaving workshop, reflecting the industrial and communal character of the settlement.

On 17 November 1966, the houses were designated Grade II* listed buildings, recognised for their architectural and historic significance.

20–23 and 23A Fairfield Square are located within the Fairfield conservation area in Droylsden. The area was designated by Lancashire County Council in 1971 and extended in 1975. Originally covering the Moravian Settlement and Broadway Garden Village, the boundary was later expanded to include the Ashton Canal, Gorsey Fields, and land north of Fairfield Road. Today, the conservation area comprises four sections: the Moravian Settlement, part of the Manchester–Ashton-under-Lyne Canal, Broadway Garden Village, and a late-1970s housing estate north of Fairfield Road.

== Architecture ==
The range consists of five houses arranged in a terrace, constructed in header bond brick with slate roofs. The terrace totals 13 bays, rising from two to three storeys in the central houses. Each house has three bays and a central entrance, with doors framed by eared architrave surrounds and topped with either flat hoods or pediments. Windows include four-pane sash windows with stone sills and cambered brick-arched heads, while the second floor features casement windows. The design is completed with an eaves cornice and ridge chimney stacks. No. 23A is entered from the right return and includes a brick inscribed with "IN 1785".

== See also ==
- Fairfield Moravian Church
- Grade II* listed buildings in Greater Manchester
- Listed buildings in Droylsden
