= Buckley Hill Farmhouse =

Listed building in Droyslden, Greater Manchester, England

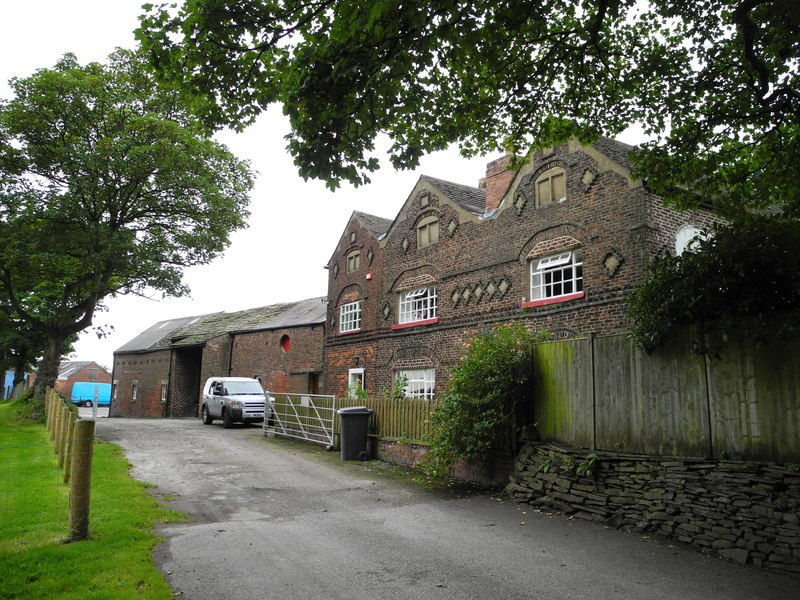
- Buckley Hill Farmhouse in 2012

- Location within Greater Manchester

General information
- Location: Cross Lane, Droylsden, Greater Manchester, England
- Coordinates: 53.4937°N 2.1249°W
- Year built: 17th century

Listed Building – Grade II*
- Official name: Buckley Hill Farmhouse
- Designated: 17 November 1966
- Reference no.: 1163826

Listed Building – Grade II
- Official name: Barn to west of Buckley Hill Farmhouse
- Designated: 17 November 1966
- Reference no.: 1067945

Buckley Hill Farmhouse is a Grade II* listed building on Cross Lane (Note: The building's official listing gives its address as Lumb Lane, but its address is on Cross Lane.) in Droylsden, a town within Tameside, Greater Manchester, England. It is protected under the National Heritage List for England.

== History ==
The farmhouse dates from the 17th century and was originally associated with the yeoman Buckley family, who were recorded as residents in 1618. It reflects the transition from timber-framed to brick-built rural architecture during this period.

On 17 November 1966, Buckley Hill Farmhouse was designated a Grade II* listed building for its architectural and historic significance.

== Location ==
Buckley Hill Farm is located in a predominantly flat rural setting, bordered by residential development to the west and the M60 motorway to the east.

== Architecture ==
The building is constructed using English garden-wall-bond brickwork and topped with a 20th-century tiled roof. The structure follows a three-unit plan and comprises two storeys with an attic, a form characteristic of 17th-century farmhouses.

The front elevation features a series of three gables. Each contains a blocked two-light mullioned window set beneath an elliptical brick arch, complete with a hood mould and a rendered square panel above. Across all elevations, the decorative brickwork includes raised lozenge and square panels.

Among the key external features are a doorway in the first bay framed by a square-cut stone surround, and windows fitted with stone sills, elliptical brick arches, and continuous hood moulds. Additional details include a blocked fire window positioned between the second and third bays, as well as two rendered chimney stacks.

=== Interior ===
Internally, the farmhouse retains many original features. One of the principal elements is the inglenook fireplace, complete with a cambered bressummer beam and a heck post. The ceilings are supported by cyma-moulded beams with ogee stops and carved corbels. A dog-leg staircase survives, with oak splat balusters, acorn finials, and carved newels typical of joinery from the period.

Other surviving features include original oak six-panel doors and inlaid oak panelling in one of the first-floor rooms. The roof structure incorporates tie-beam trusses with curved struts.

== Associated barn ==
A Grade II-listed barn, west of the farmhouse, dates from the 17th century with later additions in the late 18th or 19th centuries. It is also constructed in English garden wall bond brickwork, with graduated stone slate, corrugated asbestos, and slate roofs. Originally comprising two barns, the earlier western barn features opposed cart entrances (now blocked), decorative ventilation holes, a later lean-to addition, and tie-beam roof trusses with collars and diagonal struts. The later eastern barn includes opposed cart entrances with cheek walls supporting a small outshut roof, small ventilation openings, a later rear outshut, and a purlin roof carried on arched diaphragm walls. Additional window openings were introduced during the 19th and 20th centuries.

== See also ==
- Grade II* listed buildings in Greater Manchester
- Listed buildings in Droylsden
