= Clarksfield =

Clarksfield may refer to:

Places

- Clarksfield, Greater Manchester, a district of Oldham, England.
- Clarksfield Township, Huron County, Ohio, in the United States.

Other

- Clarksfield (microprocessor), code name for the first generation Intel i7 mobile quadcore microprocessors
