= Droylsden F.C. =

Association football club in Droylsden, England

Droylsden
- Full name: Droylsden Football Club
- Nickname: The Bloods
- Founded: 1894; 132 years ago (as Droylsden United)
- Ground: Butcher's Arms Ground, Droylsden
- Capacity: 3,000 (500 seated)
- Chairman: Dave Pace
- Manager: Dave Pace
- League: North West Counties League Premier Division
- 2025–26: North West Counties League Division One North, 2nd of 18 (promoted via play-offs)
Home colours	Away colours

Droylsden Football Club is a football club in Droylsden, Greater Manchester, England. They are currently members of the North West Counties League Premier Division and play at the Butcher's Arms Ground.

== History ==
Droylsden were originally formed at the invitation of Joseph Cropper, the landlord of the Butchers Arms public house, to play behind the pub. After twenty years of friendlies and local leagues (including winning the Ashton & District League in 1913–14), disbandment, reformations, and changes of strip, the club emerged from the First World War as the sole survivors amongst the village teams, and as members of the Manchester League.

The club also adopted their now traditional colours of red and white, the inspiration for the unusual nickname of The Bloods.

Two games in the 1921 Manchester Junior Cup Final against Hyde United who were in the Manchester Football League attracted over 15,000 fans to see Hyde prevail. However, the Bloods had their revenge two years later, taking the Cup from their local rivals.

The 1930s was the era of Droylsden's record goal scorer, Ernest "Gilly" Gillibrand, scorer of 275 goals in just four seasons. Gilly's goals saw Droylsden to the Manchester League Championship in 1931 and again in 1933, and in the latter season he aided Droylsden to the third qualifying round in their first season in the FA Cup.

In 1936, the club successfully applied to join the Lancashire Combination and, a season later, became a nursery club to Manchester City, whose A team played at the Butcher's Arms. City's surplus players were available to play for Droylsden, but the link disqualified the club from appearing in the FA Cup.

When other competitions were suspended in 1939 at the start of World War II, Droylsden entered the war-time regionalised Cheshire League. They remained in that competition, which was regarded in some quarters as being on a par with the Football League Third Division North, and reaching their highest ever league position as runners-up in their second season in 1945–46. However, the club could not build on that start and, four seasons later, failed in their second successive bid for re-election. Worse was to come with the sale of the Butcher's Arms lease to Belle Vue FC, who renamed themselves Droylsden United. All of which meant that the Bloods were forced out to the nearby Moorside Trotting Stadium, affectionately referred to by fans as 'Pork Park'. The town was not big enough to support two clubs, especially with bad feeling between them, and after the local council bought the ground, a merger was negotiated.

Droylsden went home in 1952 to a renovated ground whose pitch had been rotated to its present position, finally eradicating a long-standing drainage problem.

Two decades in the Lancashire Combination ended in 1968 with a return to the Cheshire League, after that League had lost seven clubs to the formation of the Northern Premier League. Droylsden never climbed above mid-table in the Cheshire League, but won the Manchester Senior Cup in 1973, 1976 and 1979 and enjoyed some FA Cup success, reaching the fourth qualifying round four times in five seasons and the Cup proper twice.

In 1976 Droylsden lost 5–3 in a First round replay at Grimsby Town, after a late home goal was disallowed. In 1978, Dave Taylor's goal at Rochdale sent Droylsden through to a second round tie at home to Altrincham, who ended the run with a 2–0 win. However, when the late 1970s side broke up, Droylsden's fortunes slumped, and they finished a distant bottom of the newly formed Cheshire League First Division in 1982. They were spared relegation when the Cheshire League voted to merge with the Lancashire Combination to create the North West Counties League. Droylsden were placed in Division Two of three.

The unstable period ended with the appointment of Mark Fallon as player-manager. In his second season Fallon guided the club to the Second Division Championship, which was Droylsden's first senior honour.

Droylsden have never played in North West Counties League Division 1. Their Second Division Championship coincided with the formation of a First Division to the Northern Premier League and the Bloods successfully applied to go directly into the new League.

In 1990, Droylsden ended the season as First Division runners-up to Leek Town and were promoted to the Premier Division. The club struggled for six seasons, finishing no better than 13th, before being relegated in 1996 after conceding 100 goals. They were also on the wrong end of the fastest hat trick in FA Cup history, conceding three goals in 2 minutes and 28 seconds in the preliminary round away to Nantwich Town.

Under the dual Chairmanship and management of Dave Pace, the club rebuilt itself quickly, and in 1998–99 won the First Division Championship on goals scored, regaining their Premier Division place. Droylsden also enjoyed a revival of their FA Cup ambitions, reaching the fourth qualifying round in successive seasons in 1998 and 1999.

Droylsden were better prepared for life at Premier Division level and in 2004 were invited to join the Football Conference as founder members of the new regional North Division.

After finishing third in the inaugural season of the Conference North, Droylsden were looking to go one better and reach the top tier of non-league football for the first time in their history. A fourth-place finish in the 2005–06 season gave Droylsden a second chance to reach the Conference National through the play-offs. However, they narrowly missed out on promotion in a penalty shoot-out in the final against Stafford Rangers.

On 29 March 2006, Droylsden lost 2–1 to Hyde United in the final of the Manchester Premier Cup. On 18 April 2007 they beat Flixton 3–0 in the final of the Manchester Premier Cup. Three days later they beat Harrogate Town 2–0 and so won promotion to the Conference National as Conference North champions with two games in hand. However, they struggled in the Conference National, and were relegated back to the Conference North on 8 April 2008, even though they beat Farsley Celtic 2–1, due to Weymouth's draw against Grays Athletic the same evening.

In the 2008–09 FA Cup, Droylsden beat League Two side Darlington, 1–0 in a replay earning themselves a place in the second round proper against Chesterfield. On 23 December they beat Chesterfield 2–1 after three previous attempts to play the match. The first game was abandoned at half time, with Droylsden leading 1–0, because of fog which restricted visibility to less than fifty yards, the second was a 2–2 draw, then the replay at Droylsden was abandoned after the floodlights failed on 72 minutes with Chesterfield leading 2–0. In the final replayed game Droylsden won 2–1, with defender Sean Newton scoring twice for Droylsden to secure the club a third round tie against Ipswich Town. However, it emerged after the game that Newton was due to serve a one-game suspension on the day after picking up his fifth yellow card of the season on 9 December. Droylsden had been informed of the suspension by the Football Association on 10 December. This meant that Newton was ineligible to play in the game against Chesterfield. The FA investigated the incident with the matter dealt with by an FA Cup committee on 29 December, after which the three clubs involved were informed of the decision, which was that the club were expelled from the competition, after being found guilty of fielding an ineligible player. The club lodged an appeal which failed. A decent FA Cup run came in the 2010–11 season, when Droylsden took Football League One (third tier) side Leyton Orient to a replay in the second round. They were 2–0 up at Brisbane Road after 54 minutes, only for two late goals to draw Orient level and force extra time. Any hopes of a giant killing upset for Droylsden were quickly crushed as Orient went on rampage to win the game 8–2 after extra time.

On 6 August 2020, Droylsden withdrew from the Northern Premier League, citing the impact of the COVID-19 pandemic on the club. On 26 May 2021, Droylsden announced they would not field a team for the 2021–22 season, due to the financial impact of the pandemic.

For the 2023–24 season, Droylsden returned to the football pyramid and received the funding to join the league and joined the North West Counties Football League First Division South. For the following season they laterally moved to the First Division North.

For the 2025–26 season, Droylsden were promoted to the North West Counties Premier Division after beating Maghull 4–3 on penalties (3–3 in regular time) in front of a crowd of nearly 2,500 at the Butchers Arms.

== Droylsden clubs Timeline ==
1888 : Droylsden AFC began playing in local friendlies, playing at Butcher's Arms ground
1894 : Droylsden United founded and played in the Hulme & District Alliance. Droylsden AFC now playing in the Manchester Alliance
1896 : Droylsden AFC dropped out of the Manchester Alliance and ceased playing for the 1896/97 season
1897 : Droylsden AFC reformed in time for the 1897/88 season, now playing in the Salford & District League and the Manchester Junior Cup
1900 : Droylsden AFC played in the Hooley Hill & District League and were champions in 1901
1901 : After winning the Hooley Hill & District League, Droylsden AFC played in the Manchester Federation for 2 seasons
1902 : Droylsden United played in the Cheetham & District League for 1902/03, with their Reserves in the Manchester Alliance Division 5
1903 : In July, Droylsden AFC folded. Droylsden United moved in to Butcher's Arms shortly afterwards, playing 1903/04 in the Ashton Federation, with their Reserves in the Manchester Alliance Division 4
1905 : Droylsden United renamed as Droylsden AFC and played in the 1905/06 Manchester Federation
1947 : Belle Vue founded
1949 : Belle Vue moved in to Butcher's Arms and changed their name to Droylsden United. Droylsden AFC moved to Moorside Trotting Stadium
1951 : Droylsden AFC merged with Droylsden United (ex-Belle Vue) keeping the Droylsden AFC name, moving back to Butcher's Arms

The name Droylsden AFC was used interchangeably with Droylsden FC from the middle of the 20th century. Since then, Droylsden FC has become much more common and so is the name now used.

== Club records ==
- Record league attendance: 15,000 vs Hyde United – Manchester League, 1921
- Record cup attendance: vs Grimsby Town, FA Cup 1st round, 1976 – variously given as 4,250, 4,500 and 5,018 (the latter figure being unofficial – source Droylsden Reporter)
- Record defeat: 1–13 vs Chorley, Northern Premier League Premier Division 5 April 2014
- FA Cup best performance: second round proper – 1978–79, 2008–09 (expelled for fielding an ineligible player), 2010–11 (eliminated AET in the replay by Leyton Orient)
- FA Trophy best performance: third round proper – 1998–99, 2007–08
- FA Vase best performance: quarter-finals – 2025–26

== Honours ==
- Conference North champions: 2006–07
- Northern Premier League Division One champions: 1998–99
- Northern Premier League Challenge Cup winners: 2003–04
- Northern Premier League President's Cup winners: 1998–99
- North West Counties League Division Two champions: 1986–87
- Manchester League champions: 1931, 1933
- Manchester Junior Cup winners: 1923
- Manchester Senior Cup winners: 1973, 1976, 1979
- Manchester Premier Cup winners: 1946–47, 1951–52, 1959–60, 1964–65, 1969–70, 1980–81, 1992–93, 1999–2000, 2003–04, 2006–07, 2008–09, 2009–10, 2025–26
- Tony Downes Memorial Cup joint winners: 2007–08 (shared with Chester City)
- Ashton & District League
  - Champions 1913–14
