= Wheler Street Moravian Church =

Coordinates: 53.4759853°N 2.1659803°W

Wheler Street Moravian Church was founded in 1899 through outreach work from the nearby Fairfield Moravian Settlement. The new church stood at Wheler Street in Higher Openshaw, Manchester, England.

== History ==
In July 1899 a legal agreement was signed for the purchase of 2,000 square yards of land at a cost of £900 on Wheler Street, Higher Openshaw, as a site for a new Moravian church. This was the result of several years of outreach by members of the Moravian Settlement at Fairfield in nearby Droylsden. Indeed, the location had been the site of the Edge Lane preaching station as long ago as the 1850s.

An iron structure was erected and furnished on the land at a cost of £400. This building was 44 feet long and 24 feet wide and could accommodate nearly 220 people. At the street end, there was a porch with two side entrances. At the back was a small vestry. The church had four windows on each side and a small rose window at the porch end. At the vestry end, on a raised platform, stood the communion table and a desk.

The new building was opened for worship on 16 November 1899, with public services taking place on 26 November and 3 December. The Minister of Fairfield at the time, who led this work of outreach, was Br Samuel Kershaw.

Average attendance in the first month stood at eighty. Within five years, some two hundred people attended Sunday School. An extra building was erected in 1912. Wheler Street was the first Moravian congregation in the United Kingdom to have a Scout Troop. In 1920, Sir John Purser Griffith donated more than £2,000 to clear the building loans still outstanding on Wheler Street and three other Moravian churches. At one time, over twenty groups had regular weekly meetings at the church. By 1929 a brick church had been erected and the iron structure was finally demolished in 1964. A new extension followed in 1967.

In the 110 years of its existence, the congregation had thirty ministers. Three of these went on to become bishops. Two men of Wheler Street acknowledged a call to ordained ministry and became Moravian ministers, Brn D Dickinson and D Howarth.

In its final years, the congregation had an average membership of about thirty people. Declining membership, demographic change and costs of further development prompted a decision to close the congregation in 2009.

== Bibliography ==
- Hamilton, J T and Hamilton, K G (1967) History of the Moravian Church: the Renewed Unitas Fratrum 1722–1957, Bethlehem, Pa, and Winston-Salem, NC, Interprovincial Board of Christian Education, Moravian Church in America
- Larkin, A (2009) 'Full Circle: A Brief History of Time at Wheler Street', Moravian Messenger, February 2009, p 19 http://www.moravian.org.uk/pdf/messenger_09_02.pdf
- Mellowes, F H (1977) A Short History of Fairfield Moravian Church
