= Listed buildings in Droylsden =

Droylsden is a town in Tameside, Greater Manchester, England. The town, together with its suburb of Littlemoss, contains 37 listed buildings that are recorded in the National Heritage List for England. Of these, three are listed at Grade II*, the middle grade, and the others are at Grade II, the lowest grade.

Originally a rural and farming community, linen bleaching and weaving came to the area in the mid 18th century. Then in 1785, members of the Moravian Church came to the area, and established the community of the Fairfield Moravian Church. Many of the buildings associated with this community are listed, together with farmhouses and farm buildings from the earlier era. The Ashton Canal passes through the area, and a lock, a bridge, and other buildings associated with it are listed. The other listed buildings include a church, a former toll house, and a school.

== Key ==
Grade	Criteria
II*	Particularly important buildings of more than special interest
II	Buildings of national importance and special interest

== Buildings ==
Name and location	Photograph	Date	Notes	Grade
Cinderland Hall Farmhouse; 53.49457°N 2.13174°W	—	16th century	The farmhouse is timber framed and was later encased in brick. It has a stone-slate roof, two storeys, and consists of a two-bay main range, a gabled protruding cross-wing to the right, and a rear outshut. On the front is a gabled porch, and the windows are sashes. Inside there is a cruck truss and an inglenook.	II
Buckley Hill Farmhouse; 53.49369°N 2.12493°W		17th century	A brick farmhouse with decorative brickwork and a 20th-century tiled roof. There are two storeys with attics and three bays, each with a gable. In each gable is a blocked two-light mullioned window with a hood mould and a square panel above. Most of the other windows are replacement casements with elliptical brick arches and continuous brick hood moulds. The doorway in the first bay has a square-cut surround. Inside the farmhouse are an inglenook and a bressumer.	II*
Barn, Buckley Hill Farm; 53.49362°N 2.12523°W		17th century	Originally two barns, the later dating from the late 18th or early 19th century. They are in brick with roofs of slate, stone-slate, and corrugated asbestos. The earlier, west, part has blocked opposing cart entries and decorative ventilation holes. The later part has open opposing cart entries, small ventilation holes, and outshuts.	II
3, 4 and 5 Fairfield Square; 53.47596°N 2.14965°W		Late 18th century	A row of three brick houses with a slate roof, the fronts rebuilt in the 20th century. They have a double-depth plan, two storeys, a front of four bays, and a wing, outshut and lean-to at the rear. There are two doors on the front, No. 3 being entered through the gable end, and the windows are sashes.	II
6A, 6 and 6B Fairfield Square; 53.47596°N 2.14935°W		Late 18th century	Originally one house, later divided into three, it is in brick on a stone plinth with a slate roof. There are two storeys, a five-bay central block, and recessed one-bay wings. Steps lead up to a central doorway with pilasters, a fanlight, and an open pediment. There is a later doorway in each wing. The windows are sashes with stone sills and flat brick arches.	II
7 Fairfield Square; 53.47598°N 2.14911°W		Late 18th century	A brick house with a slate roof, two storeys and two bays. The doorway has a moulded surround and a three-light fanlight, and the windows are sashes with stone sills and flat brick arches.	II
8 Fairfield Square; 53.47599°N 2.14905°W		Late 18th century	A brick house with a slate roof, a double-depth plan, two storeys and two bays. The doorway has an architrave and a three-light fanlight, and the windows are sashes, with stone sills, and cambered brick arches on the ground floor.	II
9 Fairfield Square; 53.47599°N 2.14886°W		Late 18th century	A brick house with a slate roof, a double-depth plan, two storeys and two bays. The doorway has an architrave, and the windows are sashes with stone sills and cambered brick arches.	II
10 and 10A Fairfield Square; 53.47600°N 2.14872°W		Late 18th century	Two brick houses with a slate roof, two storeys, three bays and a rear extension. The central doorway has a moulded surround, and the windows are sashes with stone sills and cambered brick arches. No. 10A has a flat-roofed porch in the right return.	II
11 and 12 Fairfield Square; 53.47575°N 2.14904°W		Late 18th century	A pair of brick houses with a slate roof, two storeys, four bays, and extensions and outshuts at the rear. The windows are replacement sashes, with stone sills, and cambered brick arches on the ground floor.	II
15, 16 and 17 Fairfield Square; 53.47546°N 2.14942°W		Late 18th century	A row of three brick houses with a slate roof, two storeys, one or two bays, an outshut at the left, and wings and outshuts at the rear. The windows are replacement sashes, with stone sills, and cambered brick arches on the ground floor.	II
18 Fairfield Square; 53.47556°N 2.14945°W		Late 18th century	A brick house with a slate roof, two storeys, two bays, and a rear wing. The door is to the left and has a fanlight and a stone lintel, and the windows are sashes with stone sills and segmental-arched brick heads.	II
24, 25, 26 and 27 Fairfield Square; 53.47544°N 2.15012°W		Late 18th century	A row of four brick houses with a slate roof, two storeys, and one or two bays each. The windows are replacement sashes, with stone sills, and cambered brick arches.	II
31B, 31C and 32 Fairfield Square; 53.47532°N 2.15045°W		Late 18th century	A row of three brick houses with a slate roof, two storeys and two bays each. All the houses have a central doorway with flanking windows. No. 32 has its original doorway and three-light casement windows with stone sills and cambered brick arches. The other houses have doorways with pilasters, fanlights, and flat hoods, and the windows have been changed to sashes.	II
37A, 38, 39 40 and 40B Fairfield Square; 53.47563°N 2.15125°W		Late 18th century	A row of five brick houses with a slate roof, a tile-hung right gable, a double-depth plan, three storeys, six bays, and extensions at the rear. The two outer doors have architraves and modillion hoods, and the two central doors are paired with architraves, fanlights and a shared hood. Most of the windows are sashes.	II
41 (The Orchards) and 42 Fairfield Square; 53.47588°N 2.15109°W		Late 18th century	A pair of brick houses with a slate roof, a double-depth plan, fronts of two bays, and sash windows. No. 42 has three storeys, and a doorway with an architrave, a fanlight, and a flat hood. No. 41 was rebuilt in the 19th century, giving it two storeys. Its doorway is in the gable end, and has pilasters and a radial fanlight.	II
46 Fairfield Square; 53.47590°N 2.15060°W		Late 18th century	A brick house with a slate roof, a double-depth plan, two storeys, and two bays. The doorway to the left has plain pilasters and a flat hood, and the windows are sashes with stone sills and flat brick arches.	II
47 and 48 Fairfield Square; 53.47592°N 2.15038°W		Late 18th century	Originally one house, later divided into two, it is in brick on a stone plinth, with an eaves cornice and a slate roof. There are two storeys, a five-bay central block, and lower recessed one-bay wings. Steps lead up to a central paired doorway with a stone surround and fanlights. The windows in the main part are sashes with stone sills and flat brick arches, and in the wings there are sash windows on the ground floor and casement windows above.	II
49 Fairfield Square; 53.47595°N 2.15007°W		Late 18th century	Originally an inn with a stable wing to the rear, later a private house, it is in brick, the right gable end rendered, and it has a slate roof. There are two storeys and four bays. In the second bay is a doorway with pilasters, a fanlight and a flat hood, and in the gable end is a doorway with a three-light fanlight. The fourth bay contains a canted bay window, and the other windows are sashes with stone sills and cambered brick arches.	II
Lock Cottage; 53.47785°N 2.15101°W		Late 18th century	Originally the lock keeper's cottage, later a private house, it is in brick with a slate roof, a double-depth plan, two storeys, two bays, and a lean-to on the left. In the centre is a door, and the windows are 20th-century casements with stone sills and wedge lintels.	II
20–23 and 23A Fairfield Square; 53.47572°N 2.14983°W		1785	A row of five brick houses with slate roofs, all with three bays and central doorways with architraves. The middle two houses have three storeys, above the doors are pediments, the windows on the lower two floors are sashes, and on the top floor they are casements. The outer houses have two storeys, above the doors are hoods, and all the windows are sashes. The entrance to No. 23A is in the right return.	II*
Sundial; 53.47490°N 2.14969°W		1785	The sundial is in the burial ground to the south of the church. It is in stone and consists of a baluster-type shaft and is decorated with stylised leaves. The dial and gnomon are missing.	II
Fairfield Moravian Church, house and manse 53.47521°N 2.14977°W		c. 1785	The buildings are in brick on a stone plinth, with an eaves cornice, slate roofs, and two storeys. The church has a hipped roof, and eight bays, the central four bays projecting slightly with a pediment behind which is a bellcote with a cupola. There is a central door with a flat head, and two outer doors with architraves and pediments. Most of the windows have been altered. The church is flanked by a similar house on both sides, each with a symmetrical front of three bays, doors with pediments, and sash windows.	II*
Former Moravian College; 53.47525°N 2.14890°W		c. 1785	A house, later used for other purposes, it is in brick on a stone plinth and has slate roofs. It has three storeys, five bays, and two two-storey rear wings. The central three bays project slightly and has a doorway with an architrave and pediment. The windows are sashes with stone sills and lintels.	II
The Bungalow; 53.47563°N 2.14883°W		1793	Originally a Sunday school, later a private house, it is in brick with a hipped slate roof. It has one storey, three bays, and a small left extension. The windows are sashes with flat brick arches.	II
Fairfield Top Lock (Lock No. 18); Ashton Canal; 53.47766°N 2.15064°W		1794–97	The lock was doubled in the 1820s. The earlier part is in stone and has double lock gates, and the later part is in brick with stone dressings, and is now without gates. There are recessed boatman's walls, and wide steps at the tail end of the island.	II
Lockside; 53.47800°N 2.15071°W		1790s (possible)	Originally the house of the canal agent, later that of the lock keeper, it is in brick with a slate roof, two storeys, a symmetrical front of two bays, and rear extensions. In the centre is a porch and a doorway with a fanlight and a keystone. The windows on the front are 20th-century casements with stone sills and wedge lintels, and at the rear they are sashes.	II
Former tollhouse 53.47781°N 2.15069°W		Early 19th century	The former toll house is in brick and has a slate roof with coped gables and a flat-roofed extension to the rear. It consists of a single room, and has a door with a semicircular fanlight. The window has been replaced by a door.	II
Former packet boathouse 53.47762°N 2.15149°W		1833	The former boathouse for the packet boat is alongside the Ashton Canal and near bridge No. 16. It is a long stone building with a slate roof, and has a boat hole with a semicircular head under a coped gable containing a datestone. On the side are a door and two windows with stone sill and lintels.	II
Bridge No. 16, Ashton Canal; 53.47759°N 2.15098°W		1838	A stone footbridge crossing the canal, it consists of a single segmental arch. The bridge has a band, the parapet is formed from vertically set slabs, there are square end piers, and a cobbled deck.	II
St Mary's Church; 53.47990°N 2.14325°W		1846–47	A Commissioners' church designed by E. H. Shellard in Gothic Revival style, it is in yellow sandstone and has a slate roof with coped gables. The church consists of a nave with a clerestory, north and south aisles, a south baptistry acting as a porch, and a chancel. At the west end is a bellcote. The windows in the clerestory are spherical triangles, and elsewhere they are lancets. Inside the church is a west gallery.	II
19 Fairfield Square; 53.47566°N 2.14947°W		19th century	A brick house with a slate roof, two storeys, and a symmetrical front of five bays. The central round-headed door has a fanlight, and the windows are sashes with stone sills and segmental heads.	II
43, 44 and 45 Fairfield Square; 53.47589°N 2.15082°W		c. 1870	A row of three brick houses on a stone plinth, with a slate roof, a double-depth plan, two storeys, and two bays for each house. The doorways have round heads, carved impost blocks, and voussoirs with alternating brick and stone. The windows are sashes with stone sill, on the ground floor they are paired with stone lintels, and on the upper floor they are round headed with voussoirs similar to the doorways and an impost band.	II
Fairfield High School for Girls, East block 53.47517°N 2.15073°W		1871	The school is in brick on a projecting stone plinth, and has stone dressings and a slate roof with coped gables. There are three storeys, seven bays, and a porch at the right end. The main doorway has a fanlight, enriched spandrels, a cornice, and a blocking course, and there is a smaller arched doorway. The windows are sashes with stone sills and lintels.	II
37 Fairfield Square; 53.47563°N 2.15100°W		c. 1875	A brick house on a stone plinth, with a slate roof, a double-depth plan, two storeys, and a symmetrical front of three bays. In the centre is a recessed porch with a segmental head. The windows are sashes with stone sills, those on the ground floor paired with stone lintels, and on the upper floor with segmental heads.	II
32A and 32B Fairfield Square; 53.47552°N 2.15051°W		c. 1910–14	A pair of brick houses with a band rising above the porches, and a hipped slate roof. There are two storeys, and a symmetrical front with three bays for each house. In the outer bays are recessed porches with stone lintels, and the windows are sashes with brick sills and flat brick heads.	II
33–36 Fairfield Square; 53.47567°N 2.15067°W		c. 1910–14	A row of four brick houses with a band rising above the porches, and a hipped slate roof. There are two storeys and a total of 14 bays. The porches are recessed with semicircular heads, and the windows are sashes with brick sills and flat brick heads.	II
