= Salem Moravian Church =

Coordinates: 53.5385166°N 2.0844465°W

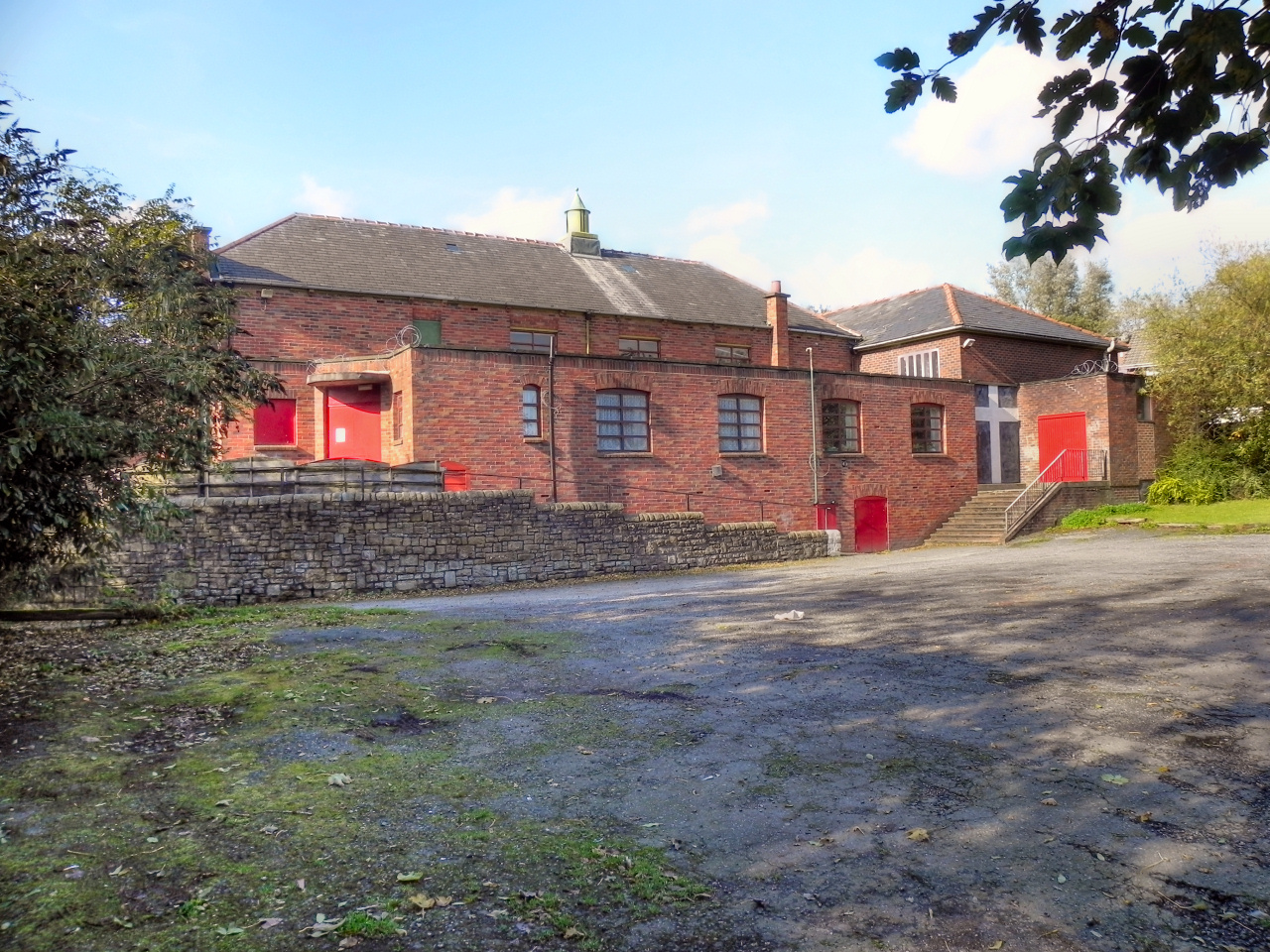
Salem Moravian Church, Lees Road

Salem Moravian Church was founded in Oldham, Lancashire, England in 1825 by John Lees. Br Lees, who lived in the Clarksfield area of Oldham, was associated with the Moravian Settlement at Fairfield in Droylsden.

== History ==
The work of the Moravian Church in the Oldham area dates to 1772, when its ministers preached at Greenacres. The services drew congregations from Lees and Oldham and led to the creation of a preaching station in Clarksfield, which was supported and serviced by the Moravian Settlement at Dukinfield in Cheshire.

In the 1820s, John Lees, a prosperous member of the Fairfield Moravian Settlement, who came from Clarksfield, hired a large room in Clarksfield to hold Moravian services. The minutes of the Fairfield Elders' Conference in November 1822 report that Br Lees filled the room and offered it to the church to preach the Gospel. Arrangements were made to supply it with preachers from Fairfield and Dukinfield every Sunday. Sr Elizabeth Smith agreed to teach at a girls' day school to be established in association with the new congregation.

Br Lees and two of his brothers built a chapel with two school rooms in Clarksfield at their own expense. They laid the foundation stones on 28 June 1824 and on 7 August 1825 the chapel was consecrated and opened by James Liley. Br John Smith was the first resident minister in 1827.

In 1865, Salem played a significant part in creating a new Moravian congregation in Westwood in Oldham.

A late 20th-century church building has replaced the 1825 edifice.

Salem Moravian Church continued at Lees Road, Clarksfield until 21st August 2022 on which date the last service was held and the building closed. The congregation was merged with the Moravian Church at Royton.

== Bibliography ==
- Hamilton, J T and Hamilton, K G (1967) History of the Moravian Church: the Renewed Unitas Fratrum 1722-1957, Bethlehem, Pa, and Winston-Salem, NC, Interprovincial Board of Christian Education, Moravian Church in America
- McQuillan, T (1950) Two Hundred Years of Christian Witness: A Brief Account of the Story of the Moravian Church in Dukinfield
- Mellowes, F H (1977) A Short History of Fairfield Moravian Church
- Packer, F G I (1965) The Moravian Church Westwood 1865-1965
