= Cyril Lord =

British businessman (1911–1984)

Cyril Lord (12 July 1911 – 29 May 1984) was a British entrepreneur, known principally for the manufacture of carpets during the 1960s. Born in Droylsden in Lancashire, Lord spent his early years living in a community of textile mill-workers. His main carpet factory was at Donaghadee in the north of County Down in Ulster. This factory was largely designed by Billy McAlister, a Belfast architect, and his team.

Lord was married three times. In 1936 he married Bessie Greenwood, and they had one son and two daughters before divorcing in 1959. In 1960, he married the author and journalist Shirley Florence Hussey (née Stringer, later married to journalist Abe Rosenthal) with whom he had one son. They divorced in 1973. In 1974 Lord married Aileen Parnell, widow of the impresario Val Parnell.

In the 1960s Lord sold some expensive rugs to film and television producer William Dozier, and was paid by a cameo appearance in the TV series Batman.

The Cyril Lord group of companies collapsed at the end of 1968 shortly after Lord's resignation as chairman on the grounds of ill-health.

The TV advertising jingle "This is luxury you can afford by Cyril Lord" was very well known in the 1960s. It was parodied in the song "I'm Bored" by the Bonzo Dog Doo-Dah Band as "This is boredom you can afford from Cyril Bored" (following a series of other word alterations, such as "drawing bored", "bored-ello", and "mortar bored") on their debut album Gorilla (1967).

During his time living and working in Northern Ireland, Lord lived on Warren Road on the outskirts of Donaghadee, by the Irish Sea. In May 1984, following a long illness, he died at his home in Barbados.

In Northern Irish football, the Dunmurray & District League had a competition in honor of him called the Cyril Lord Shield.

== Filmography ==
- Batman (1967, TV) - Carpet King (uncredited)
