= Westwood Moravian Church =

Church in Oldham, Greater Manchester, England

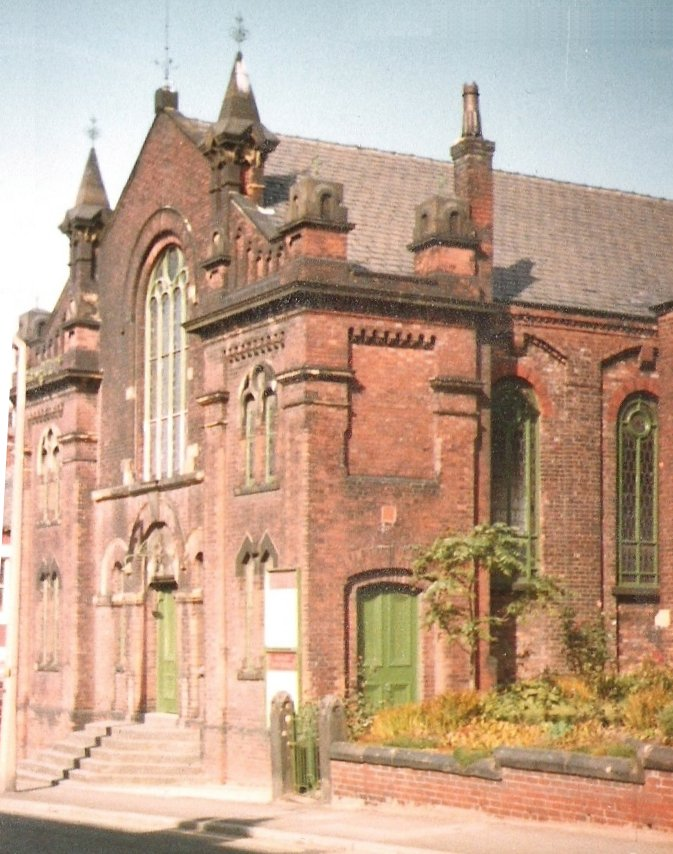
- Westwood Moravian Church viewed from Middleton Road

- Location within Greater Manchester

Religion
- Affiliation: Moravian Church
- Year consecrated: 1869

Location
- Location: Westwood; Oldham; Greater Manchester; England
- Interactive map of Westwood Moravian Church
- Coordinates: 53.543434°N 2.132545°W

Architecture
- Type: Church
- Completed: 1869
- Direction of façade: South

Westwood Moravian Church was founded in 1865 in the Westwood area of Oldham, in Greater Manchester, England. By 1868 the church building was too small for its congregation, and a new structure was opened in 1869. This church was used for Moravian services until 2005 when the congregation sold it and moved to its new premises in Royton. The Westwood building still stands.

== Buildings and interiors ==
=== Church ===
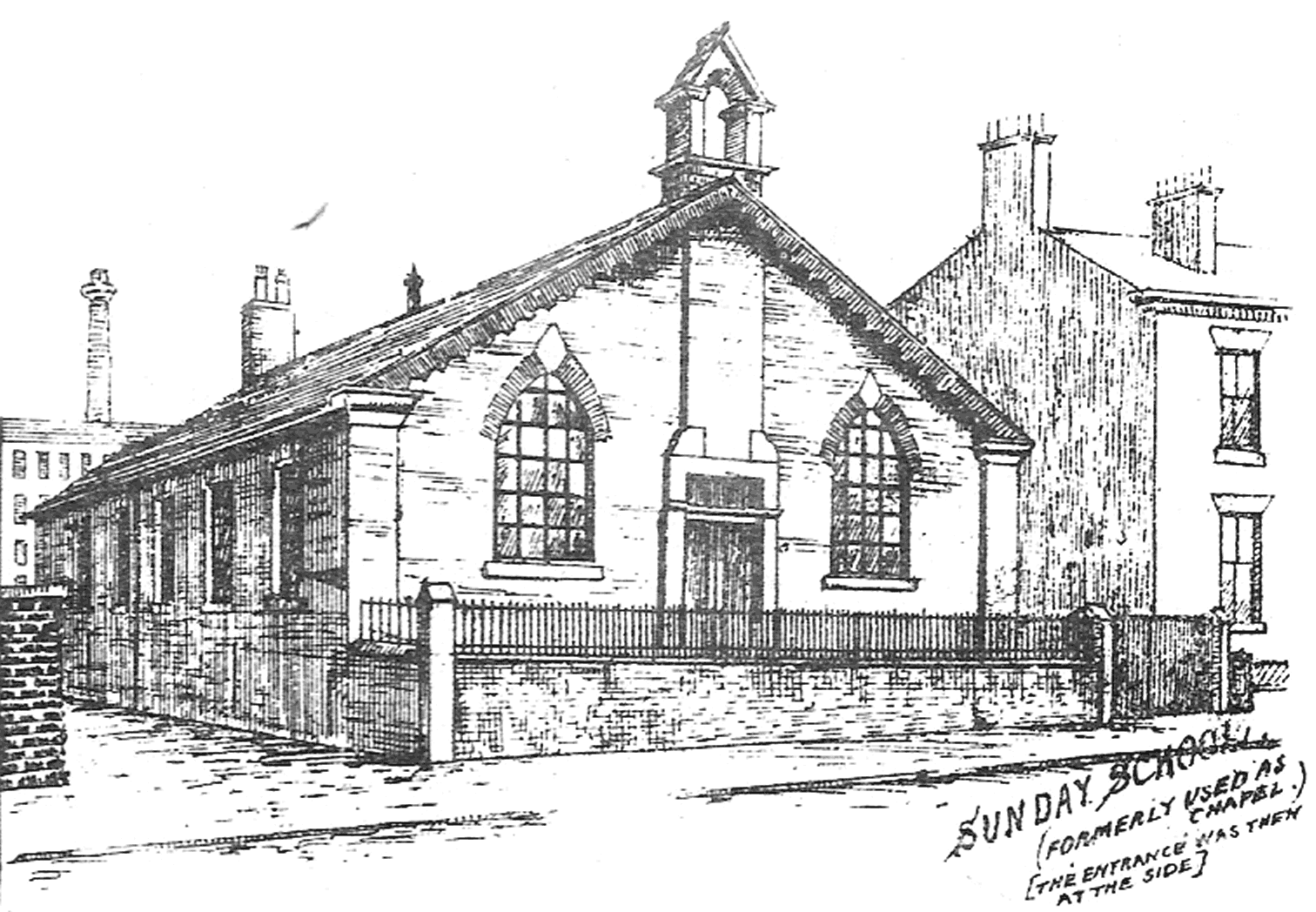
The exterior of the original chapel on Main Road before 1896.

The foundation stone of the Westwood church was laid on 5 August 1865. This building was on Main Road on the site now occupied by the Sunday School. It soon became apparent that the chapel was not big enough and building work began on a new church on Middleton Road in 1868. This was opened on 12 May 1869 and remained in use by the Moravian Church until July 2005.

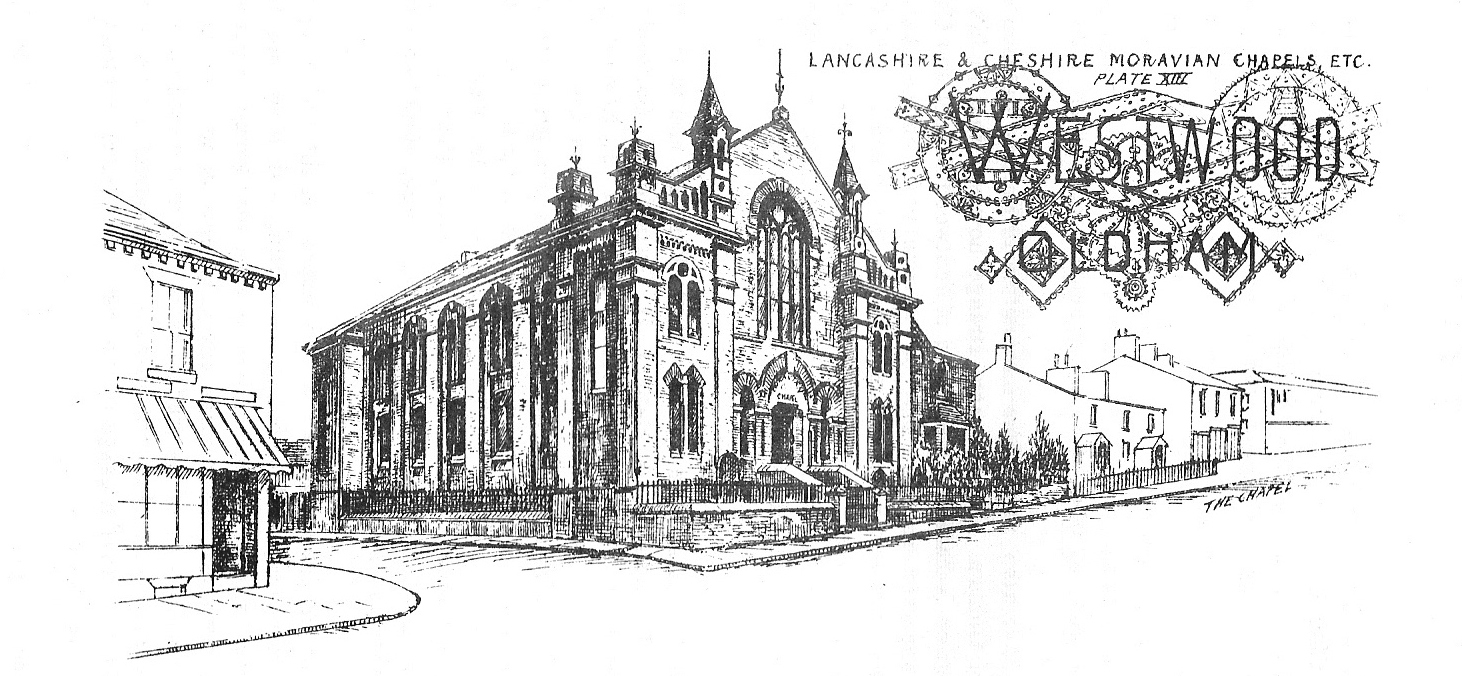
The exterior of Westwood Moravian Church, viewed from Middleton Road below Neville Street, about 1887.

The exterior of the 1869 church building was described in 2005: "The show is all to the road, where pinnacled piers frame a gabled entrance bay with round-headed arches to the door and windows. On each side bays with stairs to the galleries, with cornices and pinnacles at the angles".

A drawing exists of the interior of the church as arranged in 1882. The organ is in an apse at the north end. The pulpit, which has access by stairs on both sides, is in a central position in front of the organ. The communion table stands in front of the pulpit. Rows of pews face the table from right, left and centre.

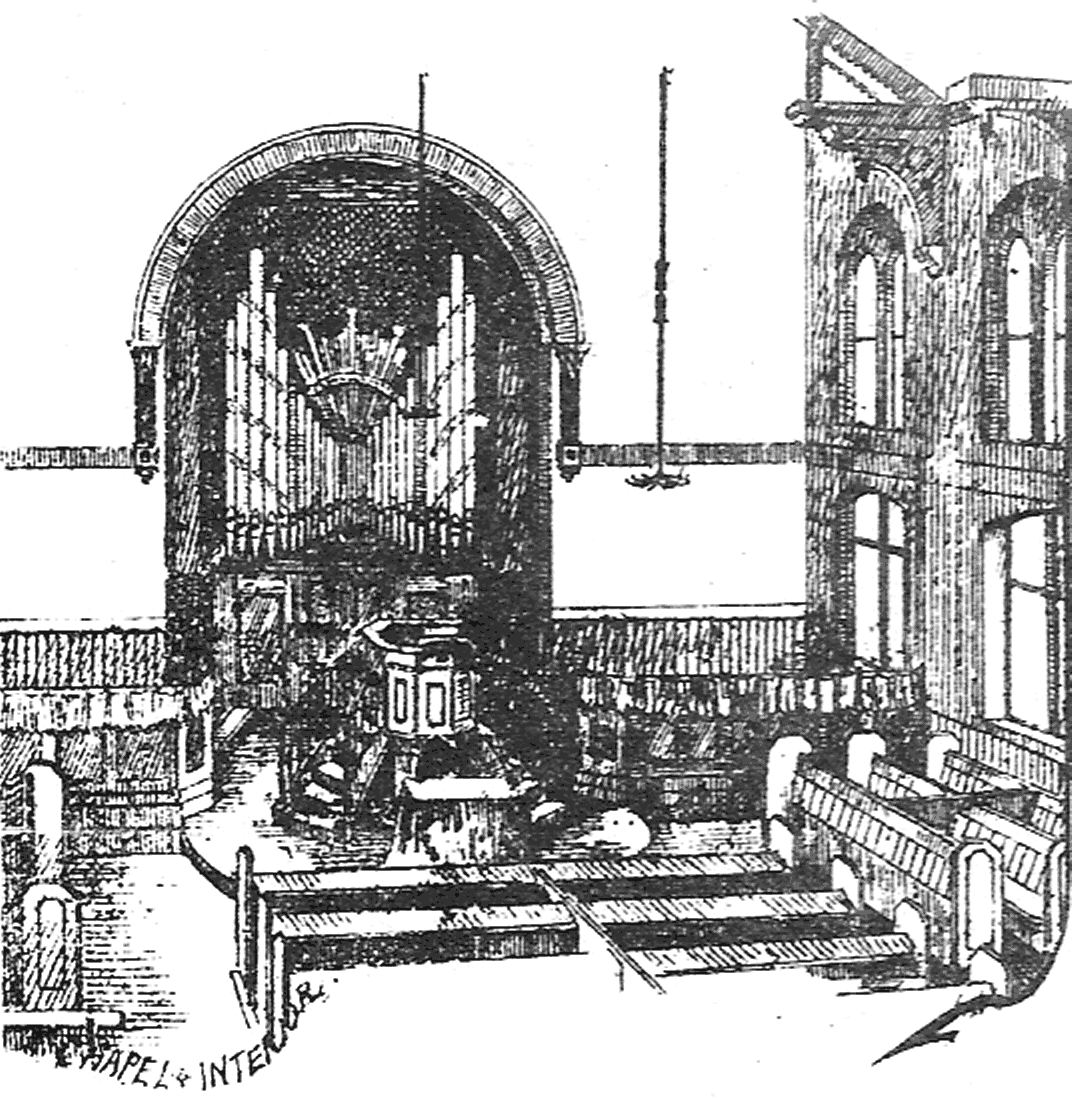
The interior of the 1869 church as it would have appeared between 1882 and 1923.

The interior was substantially remodeled in 1924. In addition to new vestries beyond the old north exterior wall for the Minister and choir, the front of the church was fitted with beautiful oak furniture. This included choir stalls to right and left; a communion table, chairs and a memorial screen for the war dead; and a new pulpit between the table and the Minister's vestry. The cost of these works was over £3,000 . In 1932 a baptismal font was given to the church in memory of Br J J Lees. When Westwood closed in 2005, the communion table, memorial plaque and Lamb and Flag symbol from the pulpit were transferred to the new church in Royton along with the font.

=== Organ ===
In 1873 an organ was bought for the church at a cost of £100. It was first used on Palm Sunday. It was replaced in 1903 with one designed by George Benson of Manchester. This organ had great and swell manuals, pedals and two arrays of stops. It was installed by Robert Jackson, the organist of St Peter's Church in Oldham. The bellows were initially powered by a hydraulic engine working from mains water pressure (with the exhaust water being used by the nearby Neville Mill) but an electric blower was installed in 1923. The value of the Benson organ was estimated in 1965 to be £3,000. It was left to be broken up on the closure of the Westwood church building.

=== Manse ===
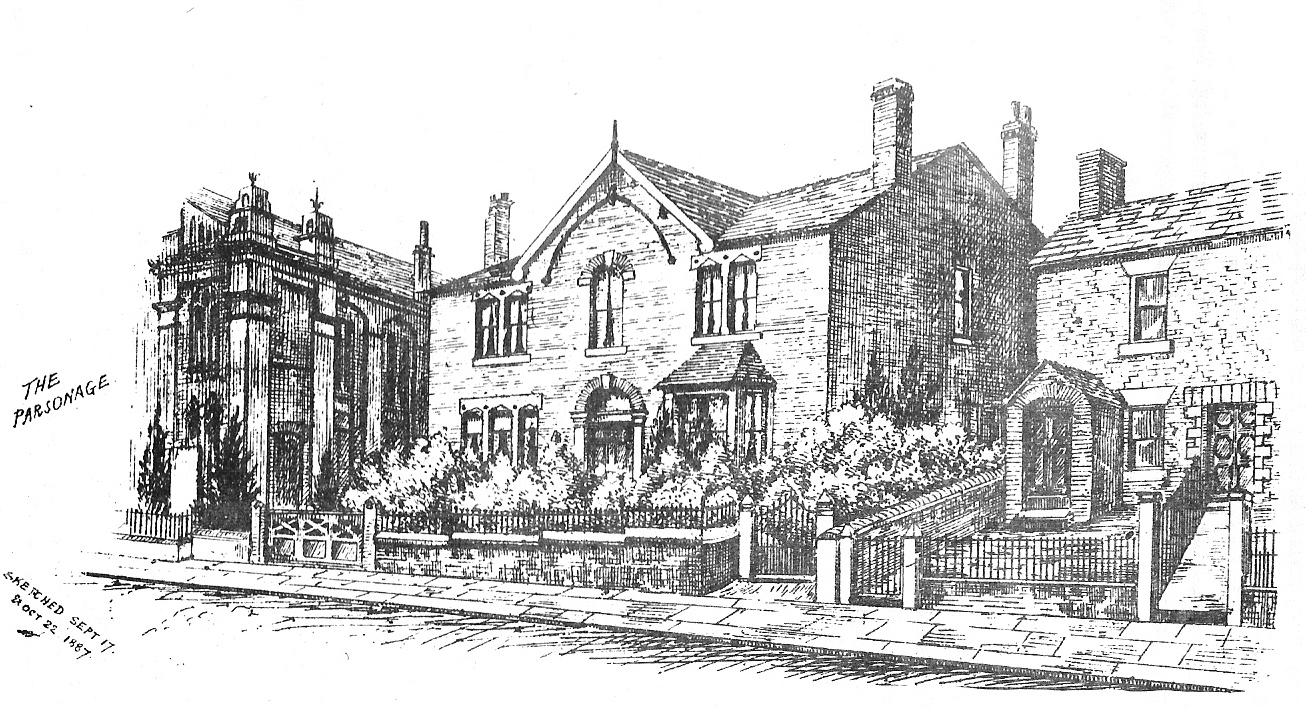
The Moravian Manse or Parsonage on Middleton Road at Westwood, circa 1887.

In August 1872, a Manse was built next door to the church as a residence for the Minister and his family. This was a sizeable detached house with a large hall, staircase and landing.

=== Sunday School ===
Following the building of the 1869 church, the original chapel on Main Road was used as a Sunday School. In 1896, this school building was lengthened and a three-storey extension added. The cost of the work was £650 but the new building was able to accommodate 500 scholars. However, on 7 April 1906, the foundation stones were laid for a new Sunday School Hall on the site of the original chapel by Bishop C E Sutcliffe among others. The architect was C T Taylor Esq ARIBA. The cost of works was £1,850. The fine Edwardian façade on Main Road is notable.

== Occupation and use ==
=== The Moravian congregation ===
==== Church and Sunday School ====
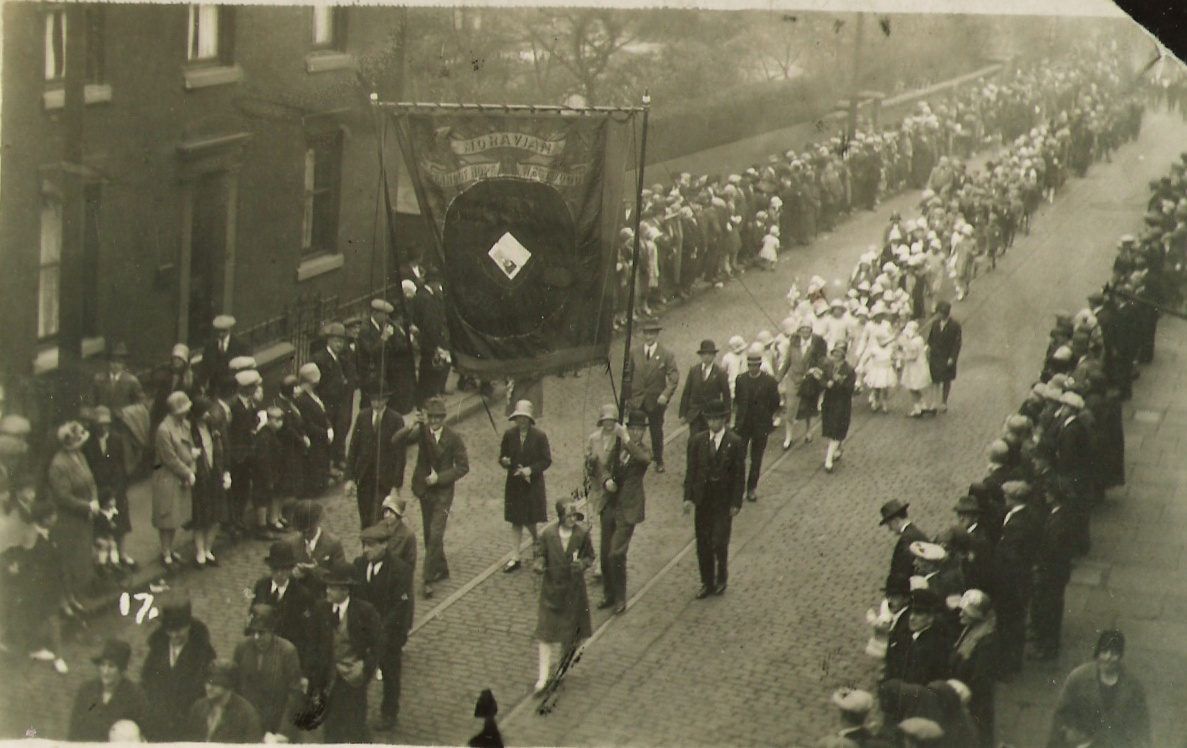
Members of Westwood Moravian Church taking part in a Whit Sunday Parade c. 1928

Westwood Moravian Church was founded in 1865 following some initial house-based work by the Reverend Bennett Harvey (the Minister of the Fairfield Moravian Settlement in Droylsden) and the Reverend Frederic La Trobe over the previous year. The Westwood mission, carried out in what was then a new industrial district, was organised by the leaders of Salem Moravian Church in eastern Oldham, with the support of the British Provincial Board, to serve the needs of some of their members who had moved to work in Westwood. In addition, some members of the Dukinfield Moravian Church had also settled in Westwood. An excellent aerial photograph of the district, showing Westwood Mill, Anchor Mill and the densely packed terraced housing typical of the area in the late nineteenth century, can be found in Law (1999).

The first public services were held in the newly built chapel on 12 November 1865. Forty adults attended in the morning and seventy in the evening. At the first anniversary service, over 150 attended in the morning and in the evening the chapel was unable to accommodate the crowd. In 1900 the Sunday School had 31 officers and teachers and 537 enrolled scholars. The average attendance was 197 in the morning and 377 in the afternoon. In 1906, the church had 173 communicants and 83 adherents. Average attendances were 120 in the morning and 200 in the evening, with 90 at Holy Communion.

In 1900, the organist was the subject of complaints that organ voluntaries were too long and that he failed to notice the number of verses in hymns. There were "times when the organist played a solo and others when the congregation sang unaccompanied". Robert Jackson, who installed the 1903 organ, is noted for composing a four-voice setting for "While Shepherds Watched Their Flocks". This tune was very popular at Westwood and was always the climax of the Christingle Service just before Christmas.

Jackson's tune

The Christingle Service was broadcast from Westwood by the BBC in December 1953.

Members of Westwood Moravian Sunday School taking part in the Chadderton Whit Sunday Parade c. 1965

To the back of the church stood the Oldham Corporation Tram Depot. In 1907 the church bought from the Corporation a strip of land between the two buildings measuring 196 square yards at a cost of £61.5.0. In 1910 the congregation considered whether it might buy the Depot as well but nothing came of this. In 1912 the church committee wrote to the Tramways Manager complaining that the grinding of trams often disturbed worship. The Manager was asked to instruct drivers to go very slowly past the church and to stop ringing the bell at the terminus during service time.

In 1958, the Church included 94 communicants and 15 adherents. There were also 183 children in the Sunday School with 32 teachers and officers. With the introduction of Family Church in October 1965, attendance at morning services numbered 170.

==== Education and employment ====
From the outset, the Minister at Westwood taught children reading, writing and arithmetic in evening classes. Sunday School teachers also gave lessons at morning and afternoon sessions. The law at that time allowed children and young people to work up to twelve hours a day in mills and factories, with breaks amounting to one and a half hours for meals. State education was not provided in England until 1870. Even then, insufficient school places meant that many children could not be taught. In 1870, there were 18,085 children of school age in Oldham of whom roughly half actually attended school. Just over 2,300 were taught in private schools. Records show that the Westwood Sunday School building was hired by day school teachers for private tuition. The School Hall was also used as an Employment Exchange from 1922 to 1957.

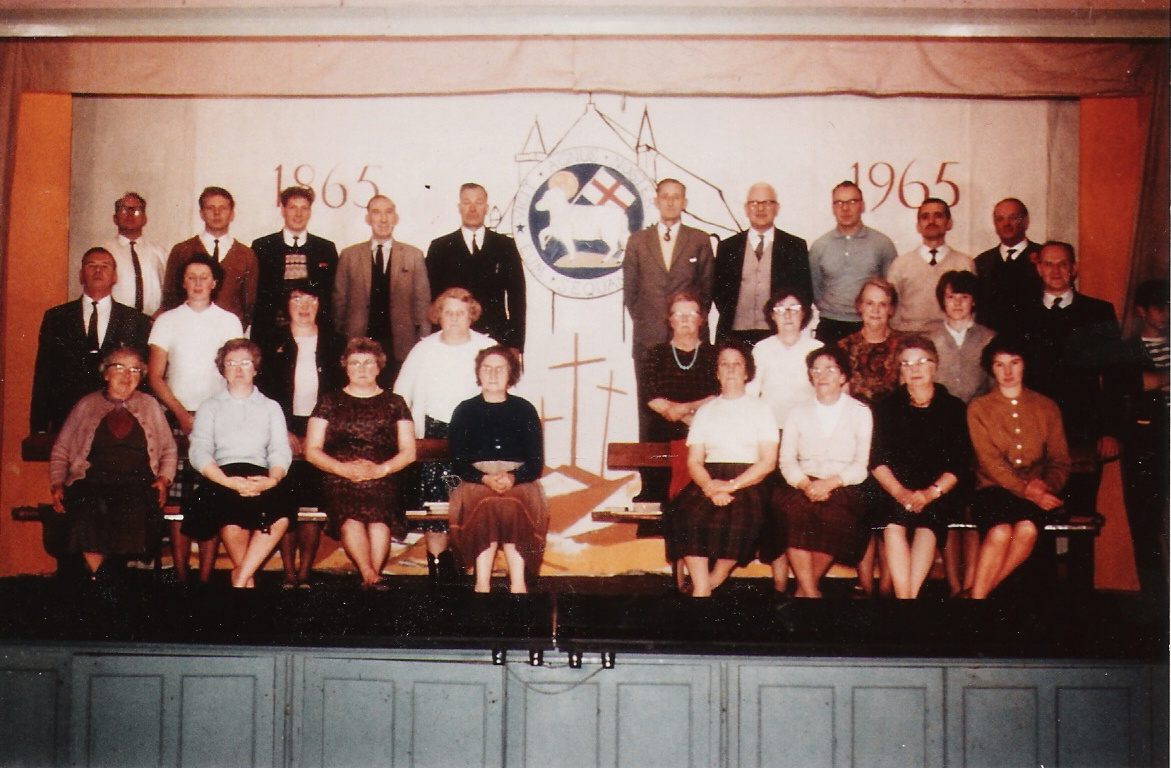
Members of Westwood Moravian Church, Oldham, taking part in a concert in 1965 to celebrate the 100th anniversary of the founding of the congregation. They stand on the stage of the Sunday School Hall.

==== Social activities ====
Westwood Moravian Church was a centre of community life for everyone in the surrounding area and not just members of the congregation.

In 1900, the associated organizations were the Band of Hope, the 7th Oldham Company of the Boys Brigade, the Women's Guild and the Men's Institute which boasted two full size billiard tables. The Boys Brigade closed in 1931 and its last Captain was Br W Dunkerley.

A drama committee appears to have existed from 1897, but this society needed to be renewed following the First World War. The Westwood Glee Club was formed in 1931 but in 1934 merged with the dramatic society. The society was still very strong in the 1970s, staging pantomimes and comedies by J B Priestley.

After much vexed debate, dancing was allowed from 1921. The Church and Sunday School committees decided in joint session that no more than six dances should be allowed in any one night, except for special occasions such as Christmas Eve and New Year's Eve. As a result, dancing took place for the first time at the Christmas Eve Social that year. However, the Sunday School superintendent and another member of the Church Committee resigned in protest. The rules were relaxed in 1931 and dancing was allowed for up to ninety minutes at any social event.

The Westwood Moravian Cricket Club was set up in 1883 and was still in existence in 1965. A recreation club for football, cricket and tennis was set up in 1922. The Girl Guides began under the leadership of Sr Emily Shaw in 1932 and the Minister, Br Edward Barker, started the Boy Scouts during the Second World War. In 1953 a Wakes Club was set up, continuing a much older tradition of voluntary saving, to help people save for holidays. There were youth clubs at Westwood from at least 1943.

==== Provincial Synod ====
In June 1939 the British Provincial Synod met in Oldham. The opening session was held at Westwood on 26 June. The Missions session on the afternoon of 28 June was also at Westwood, as were the ordination and communion services in the evenings.

==== Ministry ====
Four Westwood men went on to serve as Ministers of the Moravian Church.

In 1904 Br Harry Lloyd, an employee of Platt Brothers, was accepted for training as a missionary. He eventually sailed to the West Indies. He died in Antigua in 1941. His son Ronald was Minister at Westwood from 1945 to 1954.

Br Handel Hassell trained for the Moravian Ministry at Fairfield College, graduated from the Victoria University of Manchester and became Single Brethren's Labourer at the Fulneck Moravian Settlement in the West Riding of Yorkshire. On the outbreak of World War I, he joined the British Army and showed distinction by winning the Military Cross and Bar. After the war he resumed his ministry and died in 1953 when Principal of Fairfield College.

Br George Harp was ordained at Westwood on 21 June 1925 by Bishop Arthur Ward. He had been a minder at the Manor Mill in Chadderton before theological education at Bristol Mission College and medical training at Livingstone College. In July 1925 he set sail to work as a missionary in Labrador.

In 1947 Br Fred Linyard entered Fairfield College and graduated in arts and divinity from the Victoria University of Manchester. He then spent a year in the United States before being ordained at Westwood by Bishop G W M MacLeavy in 1953. Following service in England and the West Indies, he eventually became a member of the Provincial Board. Upon his retirement he became editor of The Moravian Messenger, the national church magazine, and was elected by Synod to the distinguished honorary position of Advocatus Fratrum in Anglia.

==== Closure ====
The church on the corner of Middleton Road and Neville Street remained in use until 2005 when the congregation moved first to St Luke's Anglican Church in Chadderton and then to smaller premises in Royton some six miles away. This move was prompted by demographic changes in Westwood and by the increasing difficulty of maintaining the buildings there.

In 1881 the then Minister at Westwood, Br H Reichel, had recommended Royton to the Lancashire District Conference as a place where a new congregation might be started.

==== Ministers ====
| Bennett Harvey, Jr | 1864 |
| F La Trobe | 1865–1871 |
| A Smith | 1871–1875 |
| F La Trobe | 1875–1880 |
| H Reichel | 1880–1888 |
| N E Sutcliffe | 1888–1892 |
| H F England | 1892–1906 |
| W Batt | 1906–1910 |

| C J Shawe | 1910–1916 |
| R E Pritchett | 1916–1919 |
| G W M MacLeavy | 1919–1928 |
| W A Summers | 1928–1932 |
| L J Britton | 1932–1937 |
| S C Neath | 1937–1938 |
| Colin Williams | 1938 |
| G Sach | 1939 |

| J E Barker | 1939–1943 |
| W Western | 1943–1944 |
| A E Brewer | 1944 |
| G Sach | 1945 |
| G R Lloyd | 1945–1954 |
| E Wilson | 1954–1957 |
| W Smith | 1957–1958 |
| F G I Packer | 1958–1966 |

| John Berry | 1966–1972 |
| C Daniel Crews | 1972–1974 |
| R G Farrar | 1973–1976 |
| W J H McOwat | 1976–1984 |
| D Dickinson | 1985–1994 |
| P Cooper | 1995-2014 |
| J Dixon | 2014 |

References:.

=== Post Moravian use ===
The use of the site immediately following the departure of the Moravians is unknown.

The Church building is currently in use by Firwood Church, a free evangelical church.
