= John Lees (inventor) =

British inventor who improved the cotton carding machine

John Lees of Turf Lane, Royton, Lancashire was an English inventor who made a substantial improvement to machinery for carding cotton.

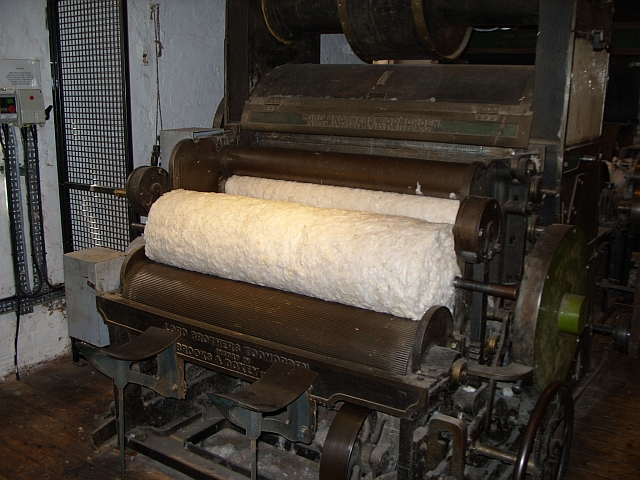
Carding machine

He improved the carding machine in 1772 by adding a feeder to it in the form of a perpetually revolving cloth on which cotton wool was spread to convey the wool to the cylinder. On 25 June 1785, he proved this in the course of the trial concerning the validity of Richard Arkwright's second patent (dated 1775) for his cotton-spinning water frame.

He was one of the carding mill owners sued by Arkwright in 1781, having built a cotton mill at Fowleach at Greenacres Moor, in Oldham. He began by working a horsemill-powered cotton mill in 1776-78 but "raised himself from the extremest drudgery of the spinning room to the position of one of the most opulent inhabitants" of Oldham, with a mill and stock insured for over £2,000 in 1795.

John Lees was a Quaker and was the father of James Lees.
