= Fairfield, Tameside =

Coordinates: 53.474°N 2.148°W

Fairfield
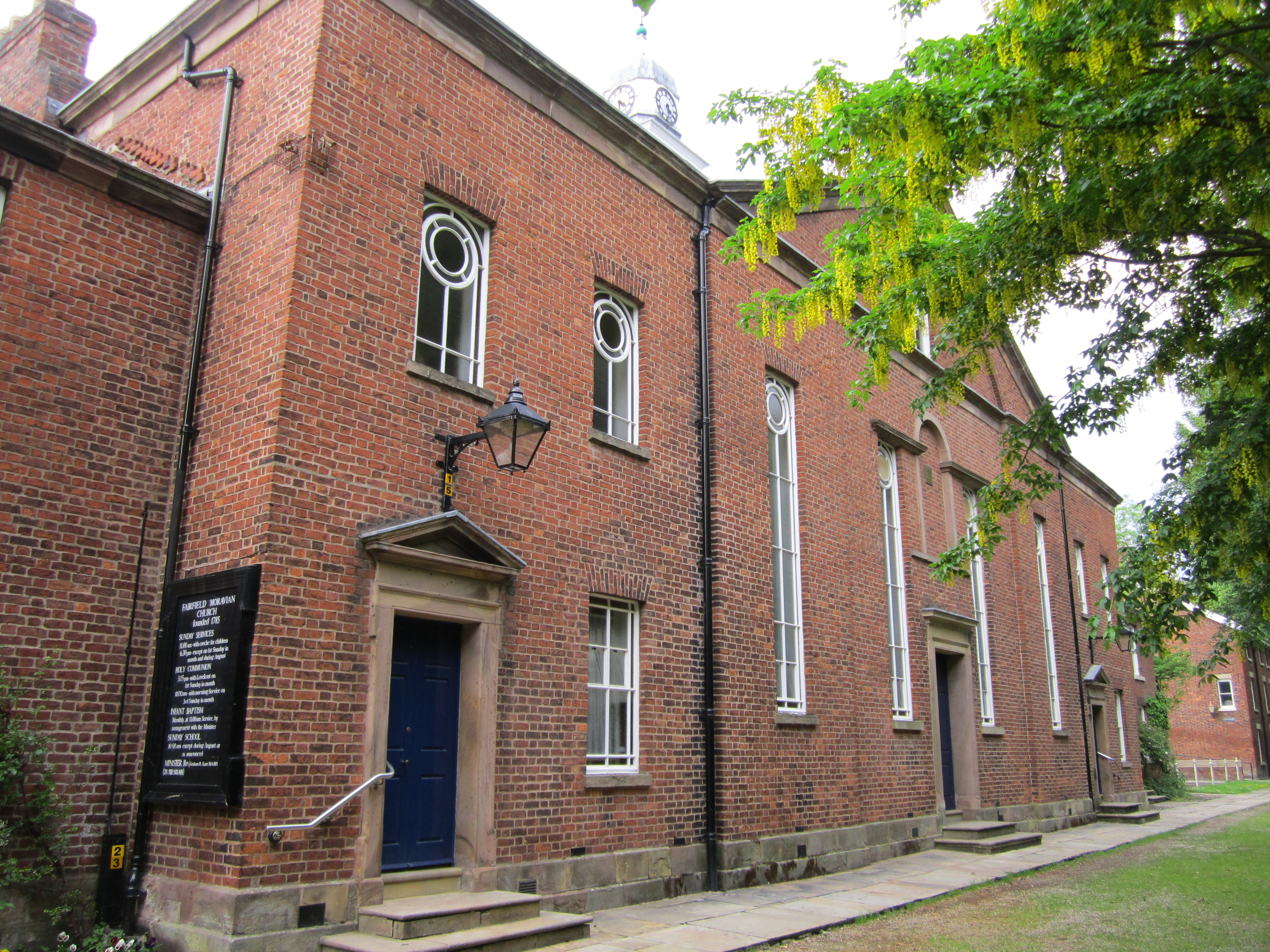
- Fairfield Moravian Church

- Location within Greater Manchester
- OS grid reference: SJ901975
- Metropolitan borough: Tameside
- Metropolitan county: Greater Manchester
- Region: North West
- Country: England
- Sovereign state: United Kingdom
- Post town: MANCHESTER
- Postcode district: M43
- Dialling code: 0161
- Police: Greater Manchester
- Fire: Greater Manchester
- Ambulance: North West
- UK Parliament: Denton and Reddish

Fairfield is a suburb near Droylsden in Tameside, Greater Manchester, England. Historically in Lancashire, it is just south of the Ashton Canal on the A635 road. In the 19th century, it was described as "a seat of cotton manufacture". W. M. Christy and Sons established a mill that produced the first woven towels in England at Fairfield Mill.

Fairfield is the location of Fairfield High School for Girls, Fairfield railway station and a place of worship. The community has been home to members of the Moravian Church for many years after Fairfield Moravian Church and Moravian Settlement were established in 1783.

Notable people from Fairfield include the artist Arthur Hardwick Marsh (1842-1909), and the merchant banker and art collector, Robin Benson (1850–1929).
