= Clarksfield, Greater Manchester =

Neighbourhood in Greater Manchester

Clarksfield is a suburban area of Oldham, in the Oldham district, in the county of Greater Manchester, England. It is east of Oldham town centre, and is close to the border of Lees. In 2012, Clarksfield was found to have an even ratio of Pakistani to White ethnic individuals, unlike other areas within Oldham where one ethnicity was found to be more dominant than others.

In 2016, an ONS study found Oldham to be the most deprived area in England. Clarksfield was a chosen area for the Oldham Council alleygating scheme, as an effort to reduce domestic burglary and provide more safety and protection for those living in the area.

== History of Clarksfield ==
In the mid to late 1800s, parts of Clarksfield were included within the area of Lees. The people of the area, like much of Oldham, worked in the cotton mills, such as those run by Joseph and James Lees, Esqrs., including Clarksfield Mill.

=== Higher Clarksfield ===
Higher Clarksfield was a modern mansion, founded by James Lees, who was the son of John Lees.

== Religion ==
The St Barnabus C of E Church, on Arundel Street, lies within the Archdeaconry of Rochdale, and the Diocese of Manchester. The groundplan for the church was created by architect Robert Martin in 1932.

Bilal Jamia Masjid, on Ronald Street, is a mosque which focuses on the teachings of the Quran and Sunnah.

== Schools ==
Clarksfield is home to an Oasis Academy for children aged 3-11. This school replaced Clarksfield Primary School, after its closure in 2017.

=== Ofsted Reports ===
The previous Ofsted report for Clarksfield Primary School resulted in a rating of inadequate in all five areas. The Ofsted report highlighted issues of safety for children in nursery and reception years, as well as inadequate safeguarding and welfare. Teaching was reported as being of poor quality, with the curriculum described as bland. Students with special educational needs and/or disabilities did not have the support needed to progress.

The latest Ofsted report for Oasis Academy Clarksfield was in 2023, and the school was rated Good.

== Notable people ==
- James Lees, son of John Lees. James played an integral role in the cotton industry in Oldham, and was the founder of Higher Clarksfield.
- Judith Barker, English actress, best known for her role in Coronation Street, attended Clarksfield School in the 1960s.
