= Fairfield Moravian Church =

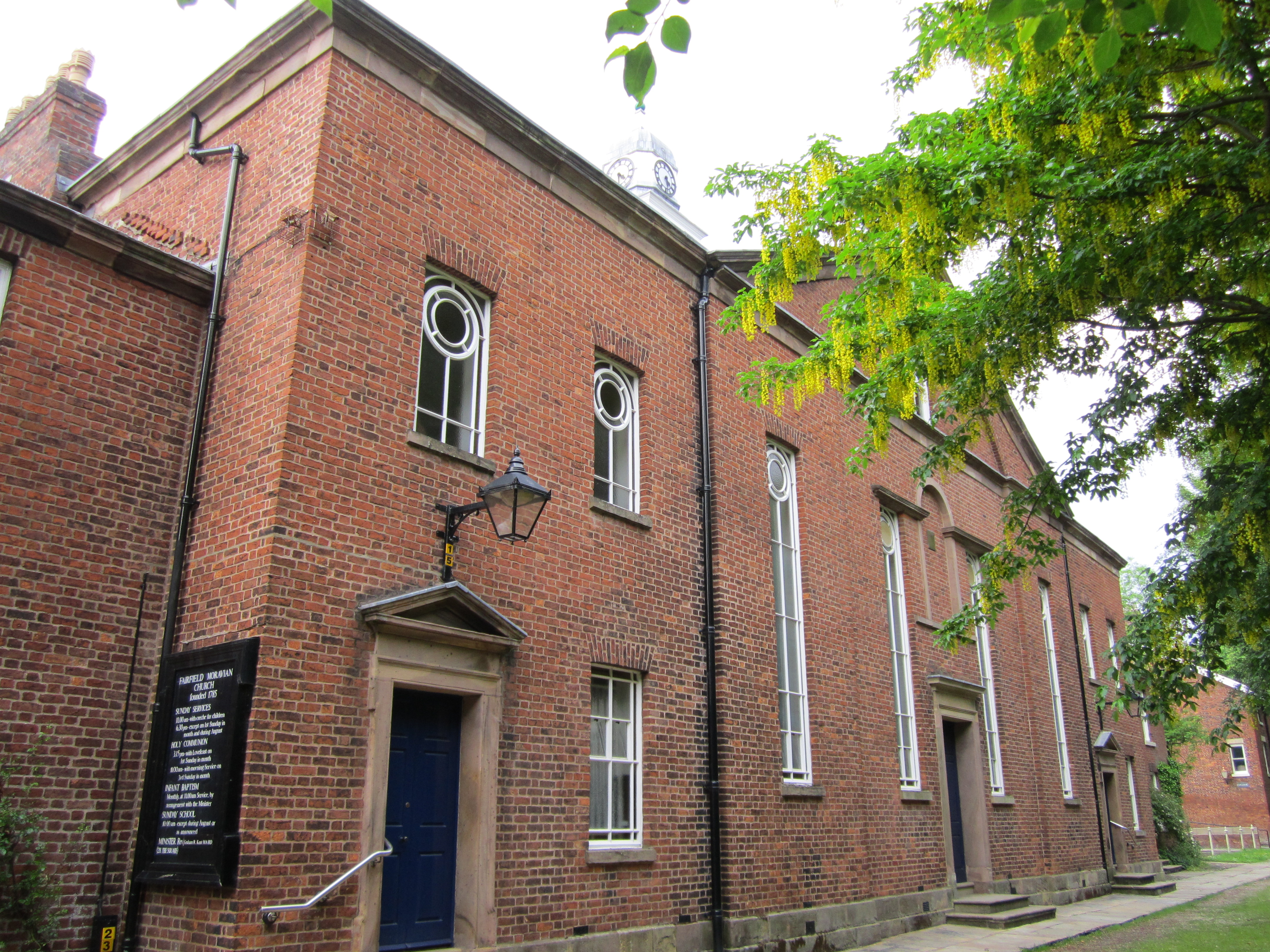
- Fairfield Moravian Church in 2013

- Location within Greater Manchester

General information
- Location: Fairfield, Tameside, Greater Manchester, England
- Coordinates: 53.47519°N 2.14974°W
- Year built: c. 1785

Listed Building – Grade II*
- Official name: Fairfield Moravian Church
- Designated: 17 November 1966
- Reference no.: 1067981

Fairfield Moravian Church and its surrounding settlement was founded in 1785 in Fairfield, a suburb near Droylsden, Lancashire (now Greater Manchester), England. It was founded by Benjamin La Trobe as a centre for evangelistic work for the Moravian Church in the Manchester area. Numbers 15, 28 and 30 Fairfield Square are Grade II* listed buildings.

== History ==
=== Foundation of the settlement ===
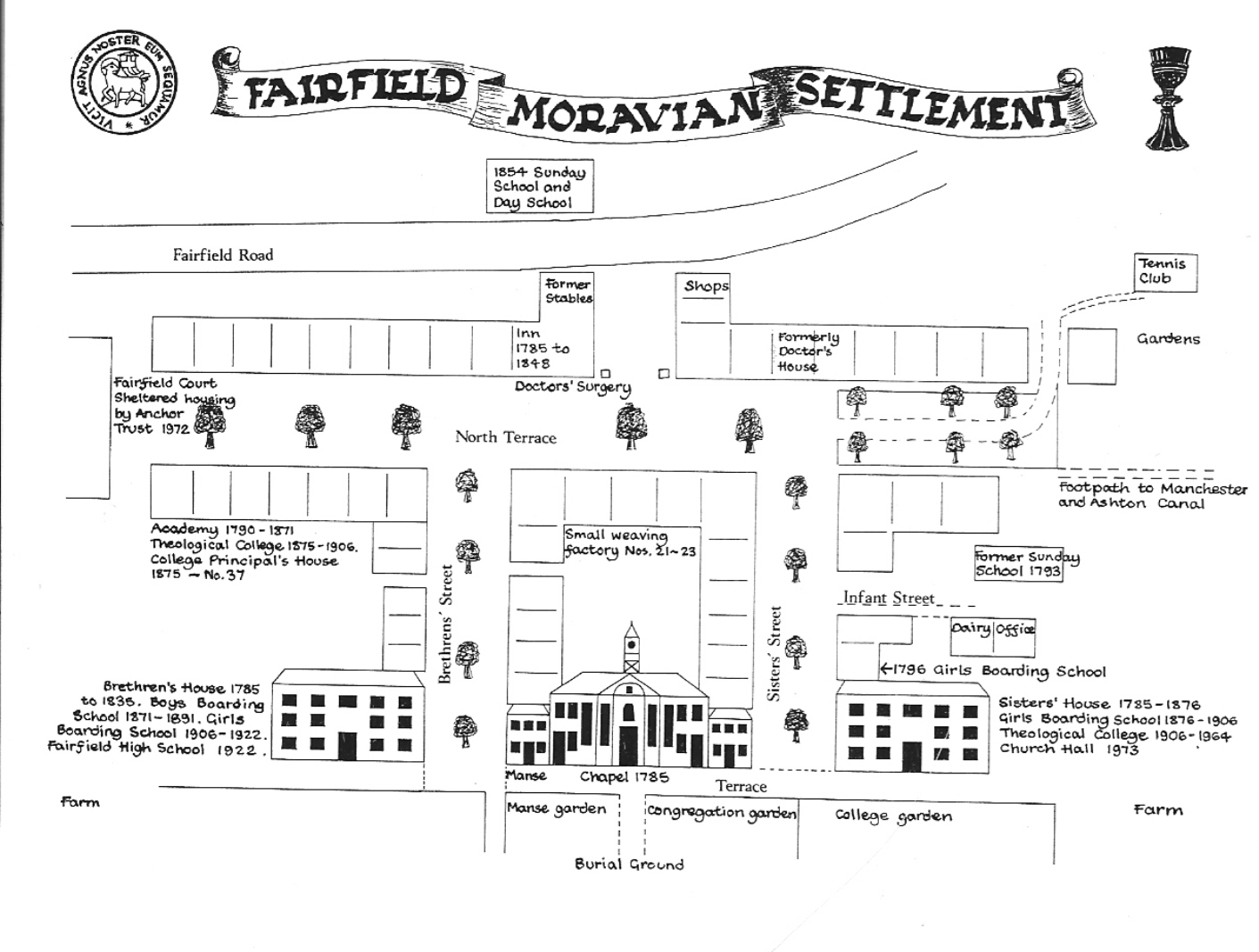
Historical sketch plan of Fairfield Moravian Settlement

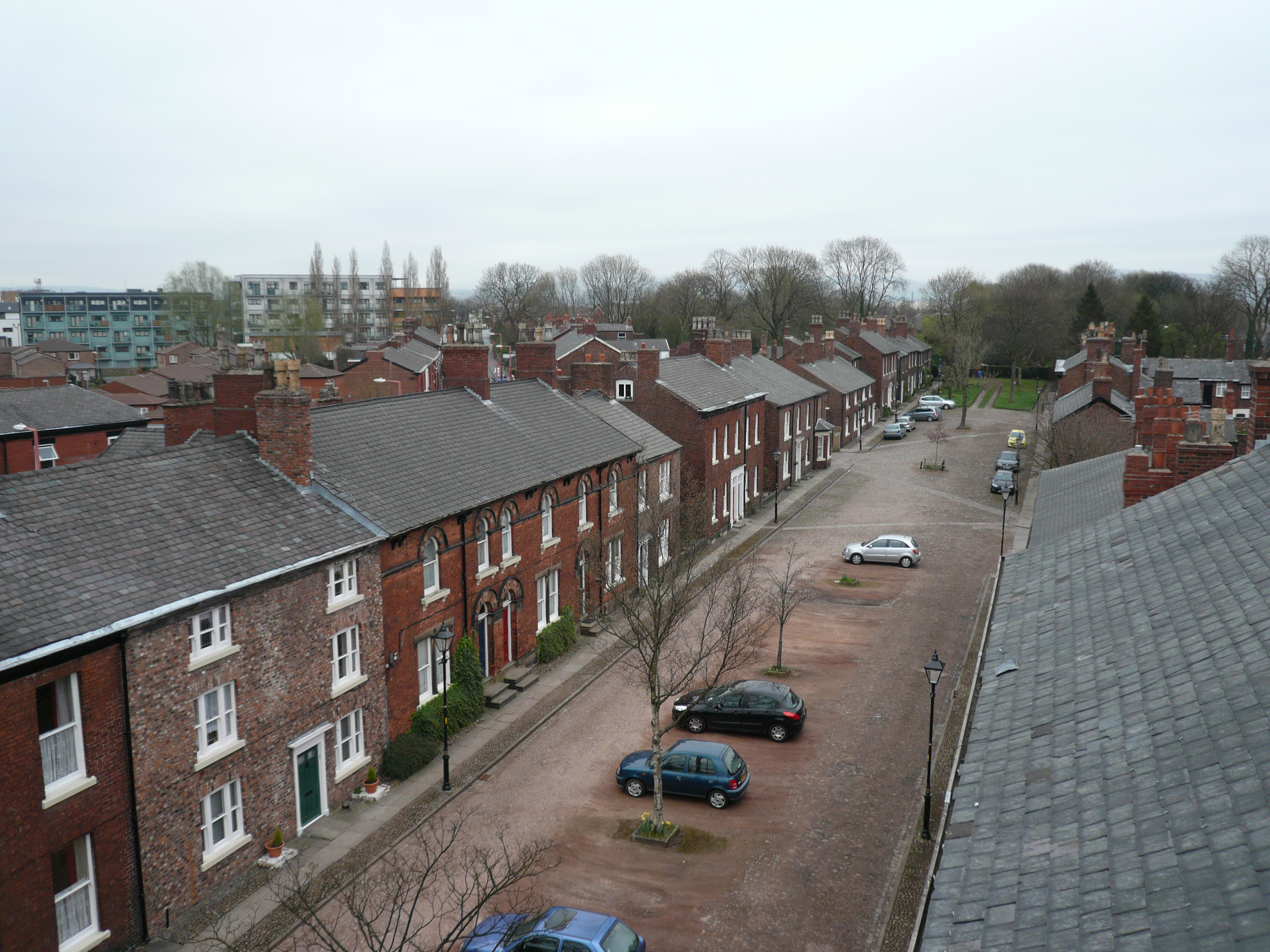
Fairfield Square

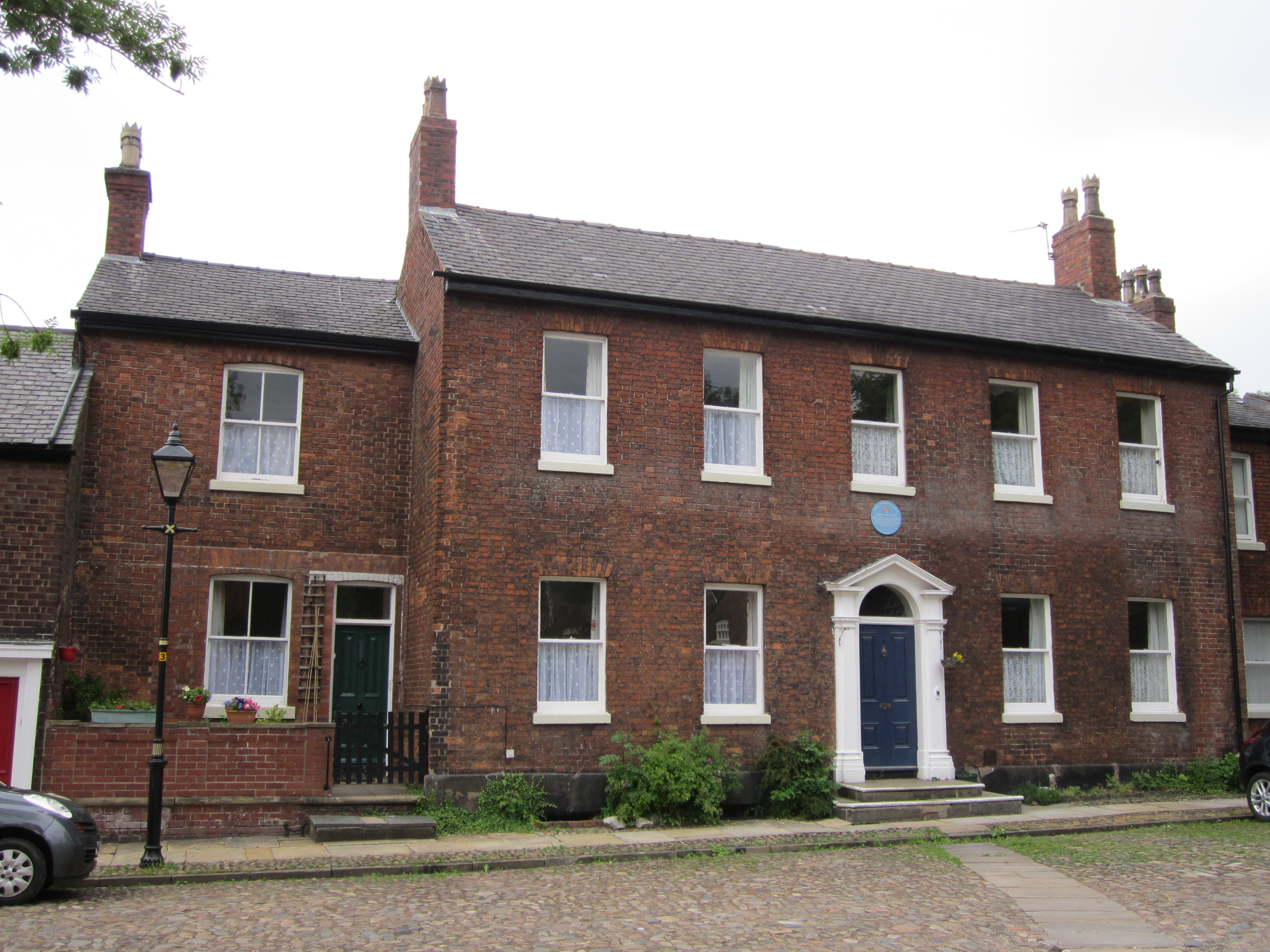
Charles Hindley's house, 6 Fairfield Square

In 1742 the Moravians established a headquarters for their evangelistic work in the North of England at Lightcliffe near Halifax in the West Riding of Yorkshire. At the request of James Taylor and John Wood of Cheshire, evangelists moved to work in the Manchester area. In 1751 a congregation was established in Dukinfield, Cheshire, with a small settlement following in 1755. This was to be the centre of a preaching mission on the western side of the Pennines. There was limited scope for expansion at Dukinfield and in 1783 the Moravians purchased sixty acres of land in Droylsden from Mrs Greaves at Broad Oaks Farm and her neighbours, Mr Saxon and Mr Kirkenhead with a 999 years lease. This became Fairfield Moravian Settlement.

The architect of the settlement was a member of the Moravian Church, Brother John Lees, from Clarksfield, in Oldham. There is some evidence that Br Lees may have sold two coal mines he owned to pay for building Fairfield. Other finance came from Moravian congregations in England, Germany and America. The total cost was £6,000.

On 9 June 1784, foundation stones of chapel and choir houses were laid. A declaration was placed in the stone of the chapel, in which the settlers expressed their desire 'to be separated from the world and its seductions ... and ... to enjoy true fellowship as children of God', to serve the 'propagation of His Gospel among Christians and the Heathen' and asserted their 'adherence to the Word of God as contained in the Old and New Testaments, and the Augsburg (or Augustan) Confession'. (The Augsburg Confession contained the core doctrines of the Lutheran Church, by which the Moravians had been influenced during their time of renewal at Herrnhut on the estates of Count Nicolas Ludwig von Zinzendorf in Saxony, Germany in the 1720s.)

By May 1785, the choir houses and 13 dwelling houses were completed and tenanted. It was a feature of Moravian settlement life in the 18th and early 19th centuries that members were grouped into three choirs or communities: married; single brothers; and single sisters. The single brethren occupied shared accommodation and worked together within the settlement as would the single sisters in their house.

=== Consecration ===
The chapel was consecrated in a private service on 15 July 1785. On this occasion, a single sister from Oldham was received into the congregation and Br. Joshua Sutcliffe was ordained deacon by Bishop Tranaker who had travelled from the Fulneck settlement in Yorkshire.

The chapel's public opening took place on Sunday 17 July. Some 1,500 people attended Morning Service which began with a musical ode performed on the new organ by Br Christian La Trobe supported by the brass bands from Fulneck and Fairfield. The use of brass instruments in worship is a Moravian characteristic now largely defunct in England but alive in Germany and the United States. Br Benjamin La Trobe preached a sermon on Matthew 28: 19–30 in a service lasting over three hours.

Benjamin La Trobe, of Huguenot descent, was the Provincial Helper or superintendent in charge of the Moravian's work in the United Kingdom, reporting to the Unity (international) headquarters in Herrnhut, Germany. La Trobe's son, Benjamin Henry Latrobe, was the architect of the Capitol of the United States in Washington, DC.

=== Settlement life ===
In 1785 the community at Fairfield had 110 members, 22 men who lived in the single brethren's house and 45 women in the single sisters' house. The congregation was overseen by an elders' conference consisting of the minister and his wife, the single brethren's labourer, the single sisters' labouress, a member of the married choir and, later, two elected representatives of the congregation. In turn, the elders appointed a college of overseers to manage the settlement, deal with repair of buildings, maintenance of roads, street lighting and supervision of economic activity.

Economic activities included weaving, baking, and saddlery by the single brethren; an inn (which was closed in 1848 because of drunkenness and reopened as a hostel in 1861); and a farm, a laundry and needlework shop by the single sisters. The settlement maintained and operated a fire engine. Later activities included brickmaking and cotton carding and spinning.

The single brethren's house was not a success financially. The young men were frequently admonished for drinking too much at the settlement's inn; on one occasion, they had some fun at a fire drill by turning the hosepipe on a Br Gilpin who took offence.

In the 18th century, the chapel was called the hall. It was unlit and unheated. Hard benches surrounded a pulpit and communion table in the centre of the north wall. The sisters sat on the east side, near their house; and the brethren on the west side, next to theirs. When the married choir came to church, men sat with the single brethren and women with the sisters. This practice continued until the late 19th century. On the wall opposite the pulpit was a gallery with an organ and a musical choir assembled to sing the responses in the liturgy.

=== The Lot ===
The Fairfield congregation used the Lot when making decisions such as admission to membership and choice of a marriage partner. After prayer the question was posed, the Lot was consulted by drawing at random one of three slips of paper. One slip marked 'Yes', one 'No' and one was blank. The practice was based on Biblical precedent and reflected the Moravian belief in Christ as the active and directing Head of the Church.

By 1815 the use of the Lot to determine membership began to wane. This may be partly due to a result on 8 May 1815 when a married woman, Hannah Kenyon, earnestly sought on her death bed to become a member of Fairfield. The elders were satisfied she was sincere and the congregation had no objection; but the Lot said 'no'.

Records show that in 1803 and 1810 six marriages were arranged by the elders and confirmed by Lot. Anyone marrying outside the congregation was asked to leave. By 1820 the use of the Lot to choose wives (it seems to have been the brethren who initiated proceedings) was also fading. It was retained for choosing Ministers and pastoral labourers. As late as 1822, the 'Unity elders sought a wife for a Br Light who was serving in Jamaica. Sr Mary Savile was thought of at Fairfield and chosen by Lot to which when informed, she accepted and ... sailed for Jamaica'.

=== God's Acre ===
A burial ground known as 'God's Acre', surrounded by quickset hedges, was established in front of the church beyond a row of gardens. The congregation provided small uniform gravestones which lay flat on the earth, bearing only the name and age of the departed as an expression of the equality of brothers and sisters. Initially, men and women were buried separately in a post mortem continuation of the choir system. The sundial in the graveyard bore the motto, 'I die today, I live tomorrow'. Mourning was not encouraged and corpses were led to the grave by a choir of brass instruments and the minister. At a sunrise service on Easter Sunday the congregation met in God's Acre to rejoice in the Resurrection. This remains the custom of the Moravian Church.

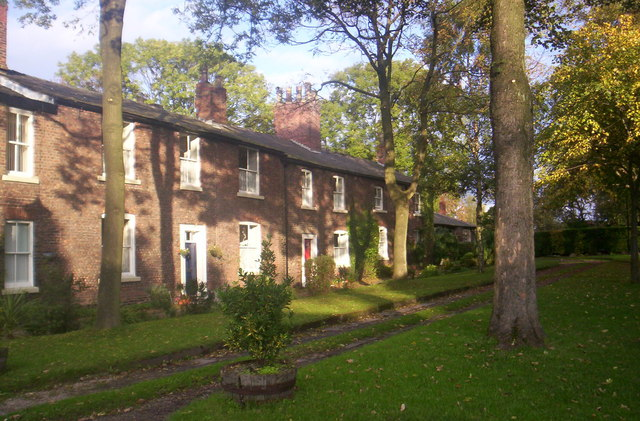
Part of Fairfield Moravian Settlement conservation area

=== Schools ===
A boarding school was established for girls in 1796 and another for boys in 1802. The boys' school closed in 1891 and the girls' in 1919. The girls' school became Fairfield High School.

=== Mission ===
The impulse of the Moravian Church after its renewal at Herrnhut was to evangelise. This did not entail proselytising from other churches. It involved creating societies which would quicken spiritual life within existing Protestant denominations or among people who were unattached to any church; and taking the Gospel to those, especially in the Danish, Dutch and British colonies, who had never heard it before.

Fairfield supported missionary work overseas: Mellowes (1984) lists 17 brothers and sisters who, within living memory, had served in missions in Labrador, Jamaica, the Eastern West Indies, Ladakh in northern India and Tanzania.

Fairfield people in the 19th century sought to establish new congregations in several places. By November 1822 Br Lees had established a group at Clarksfield in Oldham, with preachers from Dukinfield and Fairfield. In August 1825, it was established as a new congregation called Salem. In 1825 a group was established by Br W. Rice in Glossop, Derbyshire, but closed and the adherents moved to other denominations.

In the 1840s, the congregation supported scripture readers in the Manchester Town Mission. The work involved visiting people's homes and using the Bible to teach reading and writing. Br Chambers was assigned to this duty and paid ten shillings (50p) a week for it. In the 1850s and 1860s, Brn Hines and Gibbs carried this work on and visited 3,523 homes.

The work of the scripture readers led to chapels being created at Edge Lane and Gorton Brook in Droylsden and the Westwood Moravian Church in Oldham. There was some missionary work in Liverpool. Only Westwood, where a new church was opened in 1865 became permanent. The Fairfield people were generous in their support of Westwood, giving £600 and in 1871 writing off a debt of £550.

Another instance of church extension in the neighbourhood of Fairfield occurred in 1899 when a new congregation opened in Wheler Street. The nucleus of people was provided by existing members who lived in that vicinity. An iron church building was erected at a cost of £215 with the opening service taking place on 26 November.

=== Later developments ===
By the 1860s settlement life had changed and had a new role as an open congregation drawing its members from a wider geographical area. Few of the residents of the settlement were associated with the church. Activities like dramatic performance that had been regarded as ungodly were being accepted. The social life of Fairfield was moving to a form typical of nonconformist chapels, with a dramatic society, a musical choir and a young men's club for billiards and smoking by the 1880s.

=== Theological College ===
The Moravian Theological College, which trained ministers for the British Province and its overseas missions, moved to Fairfield from Fulneck in 1875. It closed in 1958 and its building was restored as a Sunday school and community centre, under the leadership and toil of Anthony Torkington, a Moravian Architect. It was opened for its new role by Bishop Geoffrey Birtill in July 1983.

== Ministers ==
John Worthington	1785–1786
John Frederick Zander	1786–1790
John Swertner	1790–1800
Christian Gottfried Clemens	1800–1805
Christian Gotthelf Ike	1805–1809
William Okely	1809–1815
Carl August Pohlman	1815–1836
Thomas Mallalieu	1836–1842
William Wisdom Essex	1842–1849
John Rogers	1849–1858
Bennet Harvey	1858–1865
John Pearse Libbey	1865–1868
John England	1868–1871
Henry Okeley Essex	1871–1881
John England	1881–1886
John Daniel Libbey	1886–1891
Henry Edward Blandford	1891–1892
Austin Smith	1892–1895
Samuel Kershaw	1895–1904
Arthur Stanley Ward	1904–1906
John Norman Libbey	1906–1906
Clarence Harvey Shawe	1906–1915
Samuel Libbey Connor	1915–1922
James Connor	1922–1928
Joseph Edmund Hutton	1928–1934
Ernest Walter Porter	1934–1940
Patrick Edward Septimus Craig	1940–1947
Handel Hassall	1947–1948
John Humphrey Foy	1948–1954
Geoffrey Albert Mitchell	1954–1961
Norman Driver	1961–1965
Francis Hugh Mellowes	1966–1977
F. John C. Smith	1977–1994
David Newman	1994–2000
Cliff Winfield	2000–2003
Richard Ingham	2003–2012
Graham Kent	2012–2014
Philip J. Cooper	2014–2022
Peter Madsen Gubi	2023–2026
Jane Carter	2026–

== See also ==
- 20–23 and 23A Fairfield Square, five historic houses in the Fairfield Moravian Settlement
- Listed buildings in Droylsden

== Bibliography ==
- Hamilton, J. T., and Hamilton, K H (1967), A History of the Moravian Church: the Renewed Unitas Fratrum 1722–1957, [Bethlehem, Pa.: Interprovincial Board of Christian Education, Moravian Church in America]
- Mellowes, F. H. (1977), A Short History of Fairfield Moravian Church, Fairfield: (pr. by the Puritan Pr.)
- Mellowes, F. H. (1984), Two Hundred Years of Church Service: Sketches of some notable Church Servants of Fairfield Congregation 1795–1985
- Shawe, Rt Revd C. H., DD (1977) The Spirit of the Moravian Church, London: The Moravian Book Room
