= Droylsden =

Town in Greater Manchester, England

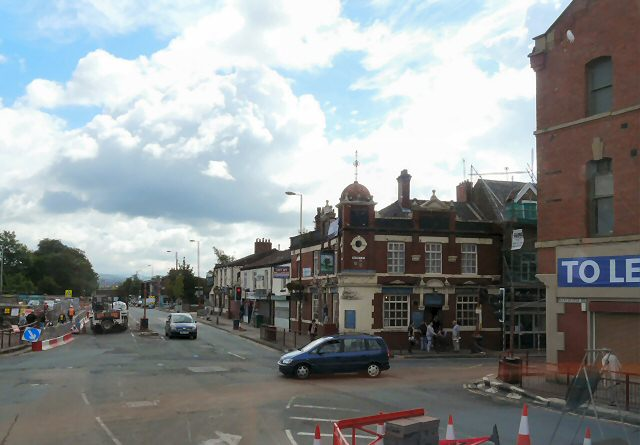
- Droylsden town centre

- Location within Greater Manchester
- Population: 22,689 (2011 Census)
- OS grid reference: SJ8998
  - London: 161 miles (259 km) SSE
- Metropolitan borough: Tameside
- Metropolitan county: Greater Manchester
- Region: North West
- Country: England
- Sovereign state: United Kingdom
- Post town: MANCHESTER
- Postcode district: M43
- Dialling code: 0161
- Police: Greater Manchester
- Fire: Greater Manchester
- Ambulance: North West
- UK Parliament: Ashton-under-Lyne

Droylsden is a town in Tameside, Greater Manchester, England, 4 miles (6.4 km) east of Manchester city centre, with a population at the 2011 Census of 22,689.

Within the boundaries of the historic county of Lancashire, in the mid-19th century Droylsden grew as a mill town on the Ashton canal. Beginning in the early 1930s, Droylsden's population expanded rapidly as it became a housing overflow area for neighbouring Manchester.

Since 1785, the Fairfield area of Droylsden has been home to a Moravian Church.

== History ==
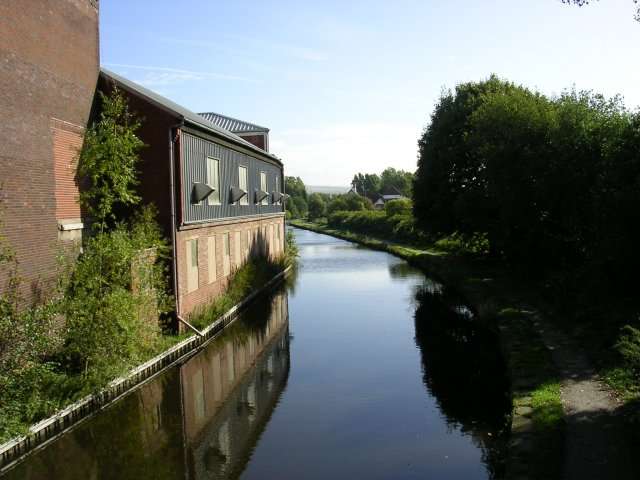
The Ashton Canal through Droylsden

Droylsden was settled around AD 900. Before Droylsden became a part of Greater Manchester, it was popularly referred to by Mancunians as "The Silly Country". One suggestion as to the source of that nickname is that once a year, some of the townsfolk used to watch an annual carnival by bringing a pig and sitting it on a wall to watch the passing entertainment with them. The Pig on the Wall public house, converted from a farm in 1978, takes its name from that story.

The first machine woven towel in the world – the terry towel – was produced by W. M. Christy and Sons of Fairfield Mills, in Droylsden, in 1851. William Miller Christy's son, Henry Christy, had brought back a looped towel from Turkey in the 1840s, which Christy's managed to copy on an adapted loom. Their Royal Turkish towels became famous, with Queen Victoria having a regular order. The mill closed at the end of the 1980s, and in 1997 Tesco opened a supermarket on the site.

Construction of a marina began in 2007, and was completed in 2012. The marina has 92 three and four-bedroom houses, and 291 one and two-bedroom apartments as well as waterside offices, restaurants, and shops.

== Geography ==
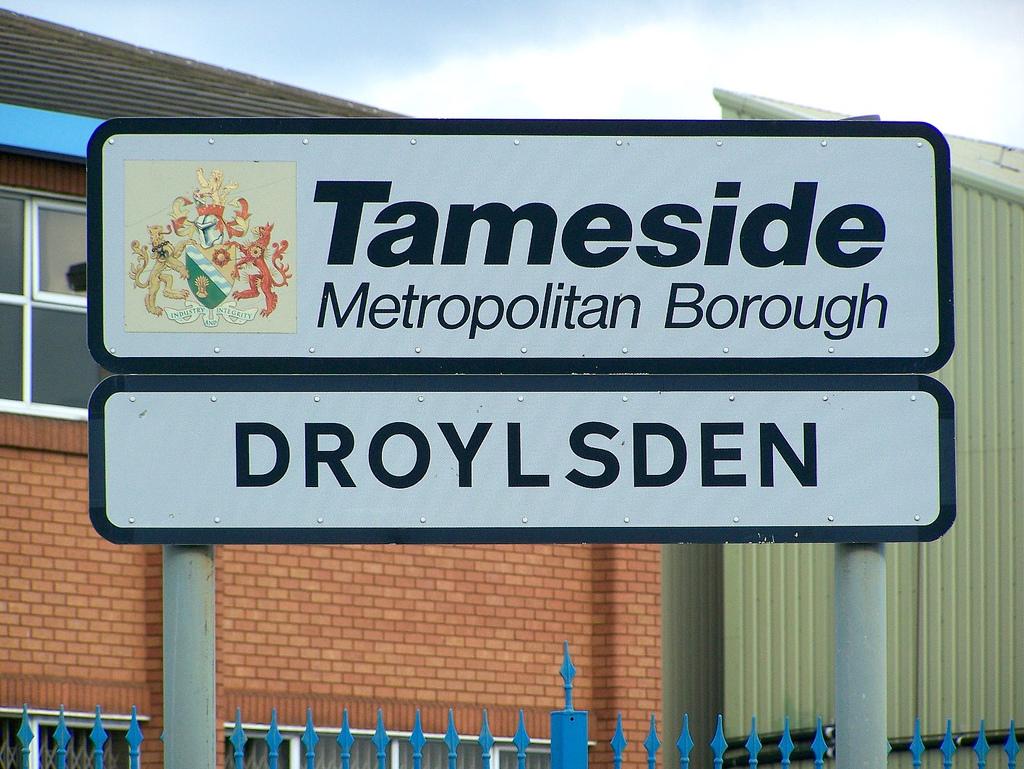
A welcome sign at Droyslden's boundary

Droylsden is located at 53°28′58″N 2°9′30″W (53.4826, −2.1582), about 4 miles (6 km) to the east of Manchester city centre, close to Ashton-under-Lyne, Failsworth, Clayton, Openshaw and Newton Heath.

== Transport ==
=== Rail ===
Droylsden is not directly served by railway with the nearest station being Fairfield railway station approximately 1 mile south of the town centre, providing a service to Manchester Piccadilly and Rose Hill Marple. The town's former railway station was open between 1846 and 1968 and located on Lumb Lane, approximately 1 mile north of the town centre on the Huddersfield Line. The nearest station on this line is Ashton-under-Lyne.

=== Metrolink ===
From 2013, Droylsden became a terminus on the East Manchester line of the Manchester Metrolink tram network, with services running to Manchester and Bury. Trams now run from Droylsden to Ashton-under-Lyne via Audenshaw and Ashton Moss.

=== Bus ===
The town has frequent bus services, the majority operated by Stagecoach Manchester. Buses 7, 7A and 7B run between Ashton-under-Lyne and Stockport. Bus 216 runs a main-road service between Manchester city centre and Ashton-under-Lyne, sometimes extending to Stalybridge in the evening. Bus 217 runs between Ashton-under-Lyne and Manchester Piccadilly, taking a more indirect route. Buses 230 and 231 run between Ashton-under-Lyne and Manchester city centre.

== Education ==
In January 2009, the closure of Droylsden School Mathematics and Computing College for Girls and Littlemoss High School for Boys was approved by Tameside Council. This was conditional on the Secretary of State signing an Academy Funding Agreement by 30 April 2009 for the two schools to be replaced by Droylsden Academy. Droylsden Academy, which was sponsored by Tameside College, opened in September 2009, in the existing buildings of the two former schools. The new Droylsden Academy building opened on the school site of Droylsden School Mathematics and Computing College for Girls in January 2012.

Fairfield High School for Girls was unaffected by these changes and has been granted Specialist Science College status.

Tameside College also operates a Local Learning Centre for adult learners in Droylsden.

== Governance ==
Arms of the former Droylsden Urban District Council

Droylsden was anciently a chapelry in the parish of Manchester, within the historic county boundaries of Lancashire. It became an urban district of the administrative county of Lancashire under the Local Government Act 1894, and was granted its arms on 16 October 1950. In 1974, as a result of the Local Government Act 1972, Droylsden became a part of the Metropolitan Borough of Tameside within the metropolitan county of Greater Manchester.

Droylsden was once a large township, including Big Droylsden, Little Droylsden, and Clayton. In 1889 Little Droylsden was subsumed into Openshaw, and in 1890 Clayton was ceded from Droylsden's control to become part of Manchester.

From 1918 until 1950, Droylsden was represented by the parliamentary constituency of Mossley. Manchester's expansion to the east and the increase in the electorate, resulted in the seat being divided in the 1950 boundary change. The areas adjacent to Manchester, including Droylsden, formed the new Droylsden constituency, with the remainder forming part of Ashton-under-Lyne. The Droylsden constituency was abolished in 1955, when Droylsden itself became part of the Ashton-under-Lyne constituency.

David Heyes MP represented the constituency of Ashton-under-Lyne from 2001 to 2015. He was replaced by his fellow Labour Party member Angela Rayner in the 2015 UK General Election.

== Culture ==
The Droylsden Little Theatre has been running amateur productions since 1931.

Horror film production company Fade To Blood Films is based in Droylsden

== Population change ==
Population growth in Droylsden since 1801
Year	1801	1811	1821	1831	1841	1851	1861	1871	1881	1891
Population	1,552	2,201	2,855	2,996	4,933	6,280	8,798	8,973	8,679	9,482
Year	1901	1911	1921	1931	1939	1951	1961	1971	2001	2011
Population	11,087	13,259	13,878	13,274	25,279	26,363	25,461	24,167	23,172	22,834
Source:A Vision of Britain through Time

== Economy ==
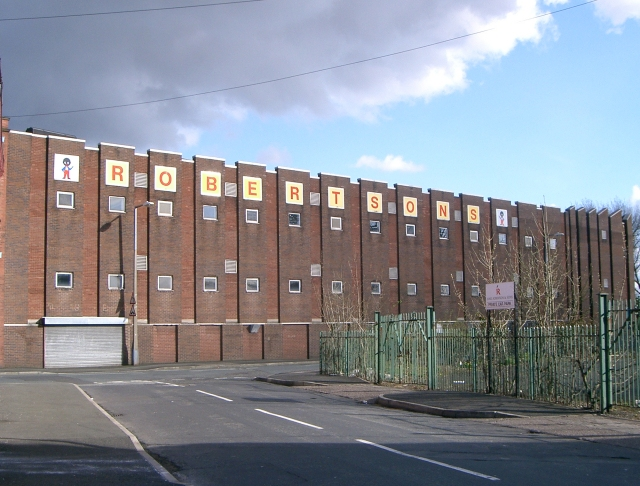
Robertson's Jam Factory

During the 1930s, Droylsden's population expanded rapidly, as it became a housing overflow area for Manchester. Today the area is predominately occupied by employed home owners.

Robertson's Jam was a significant employer in the area. The factory was established in 1891, on the banks of the Ashton Canal, on Ashton Hill Lane. At its peak it employed around 1,000 workers; that number was reduced to around 400 before closing during 2008. The factory was demolished during the early part of 2010.

== Sport ==
Droylsden is home to Droylsden F.C. who won the Conference North league in 2006–07, gaining promotion to the Conference National for the 2007–08 season, although they were relegated back to Conference North for 2008–09, and into the Northern Premier League Premier Division in 2012–13. Now Droylsden play in the Northern Premier League Division One North.

Droylsden is one of a number of locations which are promoted as the birthplace of speedway racing in the UK. Britain's first ever Speedway meeting was staged in Droylsden on 25 June 1927, billed as dirt track racing.

== Notable people ==
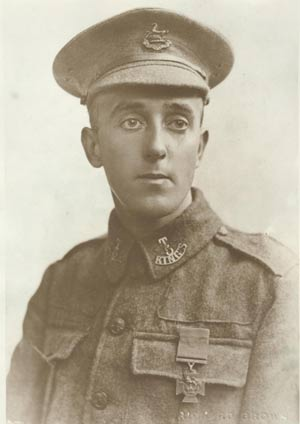
Rev Arthur Herbert Procter VC, 1916

- Thomas Jollie (1629–1703), an English Dissenter, a minister ejected from the Church of England.
- Edward Moss (1852–1912), theatre impresario and the founder of Moss Empires Ltd.
- Harry Pollitt (1890–1960), General Secretary of the Communist Party of Great Britain.
- Rev Arthur Herbert Procter (1890–1973), recipient of the Victoria Cross, and Rector of St Mary's parish church from 1946 to 1951 where there is a Blue Plaque.
- Cyril Lord (1911–1984), manufacturer of carpets, known as the Carpet King, established a carpet factory in Donaghadee, County Down
- Frank Cooper (1922–2002), senior civil servant in the Northern Ireland Office & Ministry of Defence.
- Martha Elizabeth Newton (1941-2020), a bryologist and botanist, specialising in cytology
- Allan Roberts (1943–1990), politician and MP for Bootle from 1979 to 1990
- Eric Stewart (born 1945), singer-songwriter and multi-instrumentalist; member of The Mindbenders & 10cc
- Jeff Noon (born 1957), novelist, short story writer, playwright and cult author
- Damian (1964–2017), an English singer and pop musician
- Howard Donald (born 1968), singer, songwriter, drummer, pianist member of Take That
- Dale Cregan (born 1983), local criminal, convicted in 2013 of killing of two police women in Hattersley

=== Sport ===
- Eric Evans (1921–1991), captain of England's rugby union team, played 30 games for England national rugby union team .
- Karen Barber (born 1961), ice dancer and Dancing on Ice judge and head coach
- Phil Picken (born 1985), footballer who played 239 games including 108 for Chesterfield
- Prince Arron (born 1987), professional boxer, real name Arron Jones, British Light middleweight title holder in 2011
- Jason Taylor (born 1987), footballer who played 521 games finishing with 122 with Barrow
- Danielle Young (born 1990) football manager who played for Fylde in the FA Women's National League

== Twin town ==
- Villemomble, Paris, France

== See also ==
- Listed buildings in Droylsden
