= List of schools in Oldham =

This is a list of schools in the Metropolitan Borough of Oldham in the English county of Greater Manchester.

== State-funded schools ==
=== Primary schools ===
- Alexandra Park Junior School, Oldham
- Alt Academy, Alt
- Bare Trees Primary School, Chadderton
- Beal Vale Primary School, Shaw
- Beever Primary School, Oldham
- Blackshaw Lane Primary School, Royton
- The Brian Clarke CE Academy, Oldham
- Broadfield Primary School, Oldham
- Buckstones Primary School, Shaw
- Burnley Brow Community School, Chadderton
- Christ Church CE Primary School, Chadderton
- Christ Church CE Primary School, Denshaw
- Coppice Primary Academy, Coppice
- Corpus Christi RC Primary School, Chadderton
- Crompton Primary School, Shaw
- Delph Primary School, Delph
- Diggle Primary School, Diggle
- East Crompton St George's CE Primary School, Shaw
- East Crompton St James' CE Primary School, Shaw
- Fir Bank Primary School, Royton
- Freehold Community Academy, Oldham
- Friezland Primary School, Greenfield
- Glodwick Infant and Nursery School, Glodwick
- Greenacres Primary Academy, Oldham
- Greenfield Primary School, Greenfield
- Greenfield St Mary's CE School, Greenfield
- Greenhill Academy, Glodwick
- Hey-with-Zion Primary School, Lees
- Higher Failsworth Primary School, Failsworth
- Hodge Clough Primary School, Moorside
- Holy Cross CE Primary School, Oldham
- Holy Family RC Primary School, Oldham
- Holy Rosary RC Primary School, Fitton Hill
- Holy Trinity CE Primary School, Dobcross
- Horton Mill Community Primary School, Glodwick
- Knowsley Junior School, Springhead
- Limehurst Community Primary School, Oldham
- Littlemoor Primary School, Oldham
- Lyndhurst Primary and Nursery School, Oldham
- Mather Street Primary School, Failsworth
- Mayfield Primary School, Derker
- Medlock Valley Primary School, Fitton Hill
- Mills Hill Primary School, Chadderton
- Northmoor Academy, Oldham
- Oasis Academy Clarksfield, Clarksfield
- Oasis Academy Limeside, Limeside
- Propps Hall Junior Infant and Nursery School, Failsworth
- Richmond Academy, Oldham
- Roundthorn Primary Academy, Oldham
- Royton Hall Primary School, Royton
- Rushcroft Primary School, Shaw
- St Agnes CE Primary School, Lees
- St Anne's CE Lydgate Primary School, Grasscroft
- St Anne's CE Royton, Royton
- St Anne's RC Primary School, Oldham
- St Chad's CE Primary School, Uppermill
- St Edward's RC School, Lees
- St Herbert's RC School, Chadderton
- St Hilda's CE Primary School, Oldham
- St Hugh's CE Primary School, Oldham
- St John's CE Primary School, Failsworth
- St Joseph's RC Junior Infant and Nursery School, Shaw
- St Luke's CE Primary School, Chadderton
- St Margaret's CE Junior Infant and Nursery School, Hollinwood
- St Martin's CE Junior Infant and Nursery School, Oldham
- St Mary's CE Primary School, High Crompton
- St Mary's RC Primary School, Failsworth
- St Matthew's CE Primary School, Chadderton
- St Patrick's RC Primary School, Oldham
- St Paul's CE Primary School, Royton
- St Teresa's RC Primary School, Derker
- St Thomas' CE Primary School, Lees
- St Thomas' CE Primary School, Sholver
- St Thomas' CE Primary School, Werneth
- SS Aidan and Oswald's RC Primary School, Royton
- South Failsworth Community Primary School, Failsworth
- Springhead Infant and Nursery School, Springhead
- Stanley Road Primary School, Chadderton
- Thornham St James CE Primary School, Thornham
- Thorp Primary School, Royton
- Werneth Primary Academy, Werneth
- Westwood Academy, Oldham
- Whitegate End Primary and Nursery School, Chadderton
- Willowpark Primary Academy, Oldham
- Woodhouses Primary School, Failsworth
- Woodlands Primary Academy, Oldham
- Yew Tree Community School, Chadderton

=== Secondary schools ===
- Blessed John Henry Newman RC College, Chadderton
- The Blue Coat School, Oldham
- The Brian Clarke Church of England Academy, Oldham
- Co-op Academy Failsworth, Failsworth
- Crompton House CE Academy, Shaw
- E-ACT Royton and Crompton Academy, Royton
- The Hathershaw College, Hathershaw
- North Chadderton School, Chadderton
- Oasis Academy Leesbrook, Oldham
- Oasis Academy Oldham, Hollinwood
- Oldham Academy North, Royton
- The Radclyffe School, Chadderton
- Saddleworth School, Uppermill
- Waterhead Academy, Oldham

=== Special and alternative schools ===
- Halcyon Way School, Chadderton
- Hollinwood Academy, Hollinwood
- Kingfisher Special School, Chadderton
- Kingsland School, Watersheddings
- New Bridge School, Hollinwood
- Spring Brook Academy, Failsworth
- The Springboard Project, Oldham

=== Further education ===
- Crompton House CE Sixth Form, Shaw
- North Chadderton Sixth Form, Chadderton
- Oldham Sixth Form College, Oldham
- The Blue Coat Sixth Form, Oldham
- The Oldham College, Oldham

== Independent schools ==
=== Primary and preparatory schools ===
- The Chadderton Prepraratory School, Chadderton
- Farrowdale House School, Shaw

=== Senior and all-through schools ===
- Darul Hadis Latifiah Northwest, Oldham
- Hulme Grammar School, Oldham
- Sapience Girls Academy, Oldham
- Westwood Boys School, Oldham
- Westwood High, Oldham

=== Special and alternative schools ===
- Bright Futures School, Greenfield
- Elland House School, Royton
- SMS Changing Lives, Failsworth
- Teenage Kicks, Failsworth
