= Copster Hill =

Coordinates: 53.525°N 2.119°W

- Location within Greater Manchester
- OS grid reference: SD921031
- Metropolitan borough: Oldham
- Metropolitan county: Greater Manchester
- Region: North West
- Country: England
- Sovereign state: United Kingdom
- Post town: OLDHAM
- Postcode district: OL8
- Dialling code: 0161
- Police: Greater Manchester
- Fire: Greater Manchester
- Ambulance: North West
- UK Parliament: Oldham West and Royton

Copster Hill is a locality in the town of Oldham in Greater Manchester, lying 1.6 miles to the south of Oldham town centre.

Archaically a hamlet and private estate set in open moorland and farmland along Hollins Road, the 19th-century growth of Oldham saw Copster Hill form a contiguous urban area with Hathershaw, Hollins, Garden Suburb and Coppice.

The area is served by Copster Park which opened to the public in 1911.

Two long-standing public houses survive in this locality: The Falconers Arms and the King George. The King George was built in 1911 but can trace its roots to an earlier inn on the same site, The Noggins, which dates from the early 1700s.

== History ==
Copster Hill features prominently on maps of Oldham. Whilst being part of the town it was often referred to as the little village south of the town on the old road from Oldham to Manchester. Historical references can be traced back to 1428 when Copster Hill formed part of the lands of John de Assheton and the Roman road from Manchester to York passed through the area. A small excavation by Manchester University in the area of Copster Hill House failed to find anything dating back before the 17th century. although the remains of a number of structures representing numerous phases of buildings spanning two centuries were found on the site

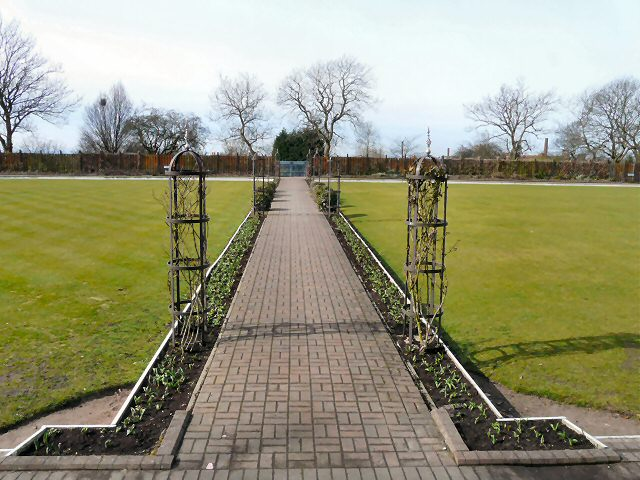
Bowling greens at Copster Park

By the mid 18th century the Copster Hill estate seems to have been jointly owned by the Bent and Kershaw families, with both families having substantial properties on the estate. The Bent family occupied Gate Field House, owned by John Bent prior to his death in 1778, while the Kershaw family lived at Copster Hill. John Kershaw, the owner of the house in 1778, rebuilt Cospter Hill renaming it Copster House.

Sometime before 1791 John Kershaw built a cotton mill. on land between what is now Copster Place and Copster House. (Copster House was recently demolished to make way for Cop Thorn estate.) The mill was small compared to later mills and probably used horses to power the machinery. However, by 1829 steam power had been introduced. The mill was notable for a 225 foot high chimney which was demolished in the 1930s.

A number of cottages built during the 1820s, known as Copster Place, still survive today. Built for workers at the Copster Mill, the look of the cottages with the sandstone flagged roofs, colour washed front and back with old fashioned style of light fittings, give a quaint appearance more in keeping with the open countryside. The inconsistency between the cottages and their surroundings is the result of unprecedented industrial expansion with corresponding house building that swallowed up the green fields.

Copster Hill was also a coal mining area and until the late 19th century a tram road existed between Copster Hill Colliery and Hollinwood where the coal was transported from the Hollinwood Branch Canal.

== Transport ==
Bee Network provides the following bus services along Hollins Road:

184 to Huddersfield via Oldham and Uppermill and to Manchester via Failsworth.

84 to Grotton via Oldham with some services extending to Uppermill, and to Manchester via Failsworth.

76 to Oldham and to Manchester via Limeside and Newton Heath.
