= Public alternative school =

A public alternative school is a state school that "provides alternative learning experiences to the conventional school program and which is available by choice to every family in the community at no extra cost". They include:

- Open school
- School Without Walls
- Learning centers
- Continuation school
- Multicultural schools
- Free school
- Schools within schools

== Examples ==
- Al Kennedy Alternative High School
- City School (Vancouver)
- Connections Alternative School
- Kingsland School
- Leonia Alternative High School
- Metropolitan Learning Center (Portland, Oregon)
- School Without Walls (Canberra)
