= Hollins, Oldham =

Area of Oldham, Greater Manchester, England

Coordinates: 53.522°N 2.124°W

Hollins
- Location within Greater Manchester
- OS grid reference: SD918029
- Metropolitan borough: Oldham
- Metropolitan county: Greater Manchester
- Region: North West
- Country: England
- Sovereign state: United Kingdom
- Post town: OLDHAM
- Postcode district: OL8
- Dialling code: 0161
- Police: Greater Manchester
- Fire: Greater Manchester
- Ambulance: North West
- UK Parliament: Oldham West and Royton

Hollins is an area of Oldham, Greater Manchester, England, 1.7 miles south of the town centre.

Formerly a hamlet set amongst open moorland and farmland along Hollins Road, the 19th century growth of Oldham saw Hollins form a contiguous urban area with Hollinwood, Limeside, Garden Suburb, Werneth, Coppice and Copster Hill.

== Amenities ==
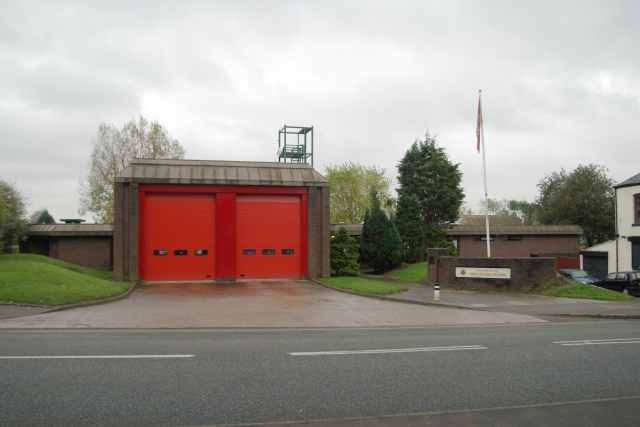
Hollins Fire Station

Hollins Fire Station opened in 1981 to replace the now demolished Werneth Fire Station.

The area is served by Lyndhurst Primary School. It was formerly served by Hollins Comprehensive School.

Hollins Methodist Church on Millgate has served the area since 1840. A Buddhist Temple, Ketumani Buddhist Vihara, was established in Hollins in 2000, although it subsequently relocated to Manchester.

Merton Playing Fields is the last remaining undeveloped land in the area.

== Transport ==
Bee Network provide the following bus services along Hollins Road:

84 to Grotton and Uppermill via Oldham and to Manchester via Failsworth.

184 to Huddersfield via Oldham and Uppermill and to Manchester via Failsworth.

76 to Oldham and to Manchester via Limeside and Newton Heath.
