= Garden Suburb, Oldham =

Coordinates: 53.521°N 2.120°W

Garden Suburb
- Location within Greater Manchester
- OS grid reference: SD921027
- Metropolitan borough: Oldham
- Metropolitan county: Greater Manchester
- Region: North West
- Country: England
- Sovereign state: United Kingdom
- Post town: OLDHAM
- Postcode district: OL8
- Dialling code: 0161
- Police: Greater Manchester
- Fire: Greater Manchester
- Ambulance: North West
- UK Parliament: Oldham West and Royton

Garden Suburb is an area of Oldham, Greater Manchester, England, 1.9 miles to the south of the town centre, contiguous with Hollins, Copster Hill, Hollinwood and Limeside.

== History ==
Prior to 1880, the area now built upon by the Garden Suburb and an adjoining area known as Hollins Green lying under Copster Hill (now part of Copster Park) lay in Chadderton (Detached), which, as its name implies, was a detached area or exclave of Chadderton township. Boundary changes from 1880 saw the area absorbed into the town of Oldham.

On 7 August 1909 the Garden Suburb, off Hollins Road, was officially opened with the first gala ceremony.

The Suburbs, as they are known, grew out of the garden suburb movement of the south.

The oasis of winding streets with a deliberate country lane feel, gardens, trees, and verges, was intended as an alternative to terrace houses.

Garden Suburb was the idea of Mary Higgs, founder of the Beautiful Oldham Society. She was impressed by Hampstead Garden Suburb in London. The first woman Oldham councillor, Dame Sarah Lees, sold land near Hollins cheaply, A co-operative limited company was formed to build 700 houses with affordable rents. By 1914, only 183 houses were let, but the initiative led to the creation of 400 homes being sold rather than rented.

They were described as light and airy, well built, of artistic appearance, with a kitchen and good range, and a pantry.

== Werneth Golf Club ==
Founded in 1909, this once semi-moorland course has several tree-lined fairways and many bunkers. The course is set in 62 acres making it one of the smallest 18 hole courses in the North West. The club house is on Green Lane.

== Transport ==
Bee Network provides the following bus services along Hollins Road:

84 to Grotton via Oldham with some services extended to Uppermill

184 to Huddersfield via Oldham and Uppermill and to Manchester via Failsworth.

76 to Oldham and to Manchester via Limeside and Newton Heath.
