= Alternative school =

Type of school

An alternative school is an educational establishment with a curriculum and methods that are nontraditional. Such schools offer a wide range of philosophies and teaching methods; some have political, scholarly, or philosophical orientations, while others are more ad hoc assemblies of teachers and students dissatisfied with some aspect of mainstream or traditional education.

Some schools are based on pedagogical approaches differing from that of the mainstream pedagogy employed in a culture, while other schools are for gifted students, children with special needs, children who have fallen off the track educationally or expelled from their base school, children who wish to explore unstructured or less rigid systems of learning, etc.

== Features ==
There are many models of alternative schools but the features of promising alternative programs seem to converge more or less on the following characteristics:

- the approach is more individualized;
- integration of children of different socio-economic status and mixed abilities;
- experiential learning which is applicable to life outside school;
- integrated approach to various disciplines;
- instructional staff is certified in their academic field and are creative;
- low student-teacher ratios;
- collective ownership of the institute as teachers, students, support staff, administrators, parents all are involved in decision making;
- an array of non-traditional evaluation methods.

== United Kingdom ==
In the United Kingdom, 'alternative school' refers to a school that provides a learner centered informal education as an alternative to the regimen of traditional education in the United Kingdom. There is a long tradition of such schools in the United Kingdom, going back to Summerhill, whose founder, A. S. Neill, greatly influenced the spread of similar democratic type schools such as the famous Dartington Hall School, and Kilquhanity School, both now closed. Currently there is one democratic primary school Small Acres, and two democratic secondary schools, Summerhill and Sands School. There is also a range of schools based on the ideas of Maria Montessori and Rudolf Steiner.

== United States ==
In the United States, there has been tremendous growth in the number of alternative schools in operation since the 1970s, when relatively few existed. Some alternative schools are for students of all academic levels and abilities who are better served by a non-traditional program. Others are specifically intended for students with special educational needs, address social problems that affect students, such as teenage parenthood or homelessness, or accommodate students who are considered at risk of failing academically.

Another common element of alternative schools in the United States has been the use of community resource professionals in various disciplines who serve as instructors on a part-time, volunteer basis. Depending upon the type of student going into an alternative school, this has sometimes caused friction with the teachers in conventional schools. The Leonia Alternative High School of the 1970s in New Jersey, which placed a heavy emphasis on the use of community resource instructors, ended up in a protracted battle with the local teachers union, resulting in the school eventually closing. While alternative schools became more commonplace by the 1990s, there were still tensions between them and teachers unions regarding the teachers losing central control over such matters.

== Canada ==
In Canada, local school boards choose whether or not they wish to have alternative schools and how they are operated. The alternative schools may include multi-age groupings, integrated curriculum or holistic learning, parental involvement, and descriptive reports rather than grades. Some school systems provide alternative education streams within the state schools.

In Canada, schools for children who are having difficulty in a traditional secondary school setting are known as alternate schools.

== France ==
In French secondary education, alternative middle schools (collèges) and high schools (lycées) are referred to respectively by the terms collège expérimental and lycée expérimental. These schools employ a range of non-traditional teaching and learning methods, including dividing the school day into disciplinary classes and classes that support creativity and individual growth, and the removal of the traditional headmaster role. Many of these schools cater partially or fully to students with learning or behaviour difficulties. Towns in France that have a collège expérimental or a lycée expérimental include Bordeaux (Collège Clisthène), Hérouville-Saint-Clair (Collège lycée expérimental d'Hérouville-Saint-Clair) and La Ciotat.

== Germany ==
Germany has over 200 Waldorf schools, including the first such school in the world (founded 1919), and a large number of Montessori schools. Each of these has its own national association, whereas most other alternative schools are organized in the National Association of Independent Alternative Schools (). Funding for private schools in Germany differs from Bundesland to Bundesland.

Full public funding is given to laboratory schools researching school concepts for public education. The Laborschule Bielefeld had a great influence on many alternative schools, including the renewal of the democratic school concept.

== South Korea ==
In South Korea, alternative schools serve three big groups of youth. The first group is students who could not succeed in formative Korean education. Many of these schools serve students who dropped out during their earlier school years, either voluntarily or by disciplinary action. The second group is young immigrants. As the population of immigrants from Southeast Asia and North Korea is increasing, several educators started to see the necessity of the adaptive education, specially designed for these young immigrants. Because South Korea has been a monoethnic society throughout its history, there is not enough system and awareness to protect these students from bullying, social isolation, or academic failure. For instance, the drop-out rate for North Korean immigrant students is ten times higher than that of students from South Korean students because their major challenge is initially to adapt to South Korean society, not to get a higher test score. The other group is students who choose an alternative education because of its philosophy. Korean education, as in many other Asian countries, is based on testing and memorizing. Some students and parents believe this kind of education cannot nurture a student thoroughly and choose to go to an alternative school, that suggests a different way to learn for students. These schools usually stress the importance of interaction between other people and nature over written test results.

The major struggle in alternative schools in South Korea are recognition, lack of financial support, and quality gap between alternative schools. Although South Korean public's recognition to alternative education has deliberately changed, the progressive education still is not widely accepted. To enter a college, regular education is often preferred because of the nation's rigid educational taste on test result and record. For the same reason, South Korean government is not actively supporting alternative schools financially.

Hence, many alternative schools are at risk of bankruptcy, especially the schools that do not or cannot collect tuition from their students. Most Southeast Asian and North Korean immigrant families are financially in need, so they need assist from government's welfare system for their everyday life. It is clear that affording private education is a mere fantasy for these families. That phenomenon, at last, causes a gap among alternative schools themselves. Some schools are richly supported by upper-class parents and provide variety of in-school and after-school programs, and others rarely have resource to build few academic and extracurricular programs as such.

== India ==
India has a long history of alternative schools. Vedic and Gurukul systems of education during 1500 BC to 500 BC emphasized on acquisition of occupational skills, cultural and spiritual enlightenment in an atmosphere which encouraged rational thinking, reasoning among the students. Hence the aim of education was to develop the pupil in various aspects of life as well as ensure social service. However, with the decline of the local economies and the advent of the colonial rulers this system went into decline. Some notable reforms like English as the medium of instruction, were introduced as recommended in Macaulay's Minute in the year 1835. The mainstream schools of today still follow the system developed in the colonial era. In the years since independence, Government has focused on expansion of school network, designing of curriculum according to educational needs, local language as the medium of instruction, etc. By the end of nineteenth century, many social reformers began to explore alternatives to contemporary education system. Vivekananda, Dayanand Saraswati, Jyotiba Phule, Savitribai Phule, Syed Ahmed Khan were the pioneers who took up the cause of social regeneration, removal of social inequalities, promotion of girl's education through alternate schools. In the early twentieth century educationists create models of alternative schools as a response to the drawbacks to mainstream schools which are still viable. Rabindranath Tagore's Shanti Niketan, Jiddu Krishnamurthy's Rishi Valley School, Sri Aurobindo and Mother's Sri Aurobindo International Center for Education, and Walden's Path Magnet School are some of the examples. An upsurge in alternative schools was seen in 1970's onward. But most of the alternate schools are the result of individual efforts rather than government.

== Alternative Education Programs ==
Alternative education programs are ideal for people who think college education is not a requirement for becoming successful entrepreneurs. These programs educate neophyte and experienced entrepreneurs while providing them with the necessary resources. An article published at Forbes.com last February 11, 2018 mentioned that many educational institutions contribute to their respective accelerator courses. The University of Missouri System initiated the Ameren Accelerator which concentrates on energy startups and assists entrepreneurs in obtaining essential know-how about the industry from educator-partners at the university level. There are international programs that also offer related resources like Meltwater Entrepreneurial School of Technology in Ghana, Africa. It has an incubator program providing seed capital, training, and learning opportunities in a rigorous one-year program from outstanding students in the African region.

The Huffington Post cited options in alternative learning like Home School, Micro Schooling, and Unschooling. The concept of Unschooling means the student learns according to the way that person wants for specific reasons and choice. The individual gets help from teachers, parents, books, or formal classes but makes the final decision on how to proceed and according to his or her preferred schedule. Micro-schools or independent free schools differ in approach, size, and authority. These are contemporary one-room schools, full-time or part-time facilities, or learning centers that are owned and managed by teachers or parents. Some parents choose this non-traditional system over formal education because it teaches youngsters to look for practical solutions. The USA is attempting to serve an increasing number of a good number of at-risk students outside the conventional highs schools. There are Alternative Education Campuses that cater to dropouts or those who have been expelled from their schools. There are reportedly more than 4,000 AECs all over the country.

== See also ==
- List of democratic schools
- Anarchistic free school
- Continuation high school
- Democratic school
- Gifted education
- Montessori school
- Public alternative school
- Reform school
- Special education
- Sudbury school
- Unschooling
- Virtual school
- Waldorf school (or Steiner school)
- Jiddu Krishnamurti Schools
