= Paul S. Walsh =

British business executive (born 1955)

Paul Walsh
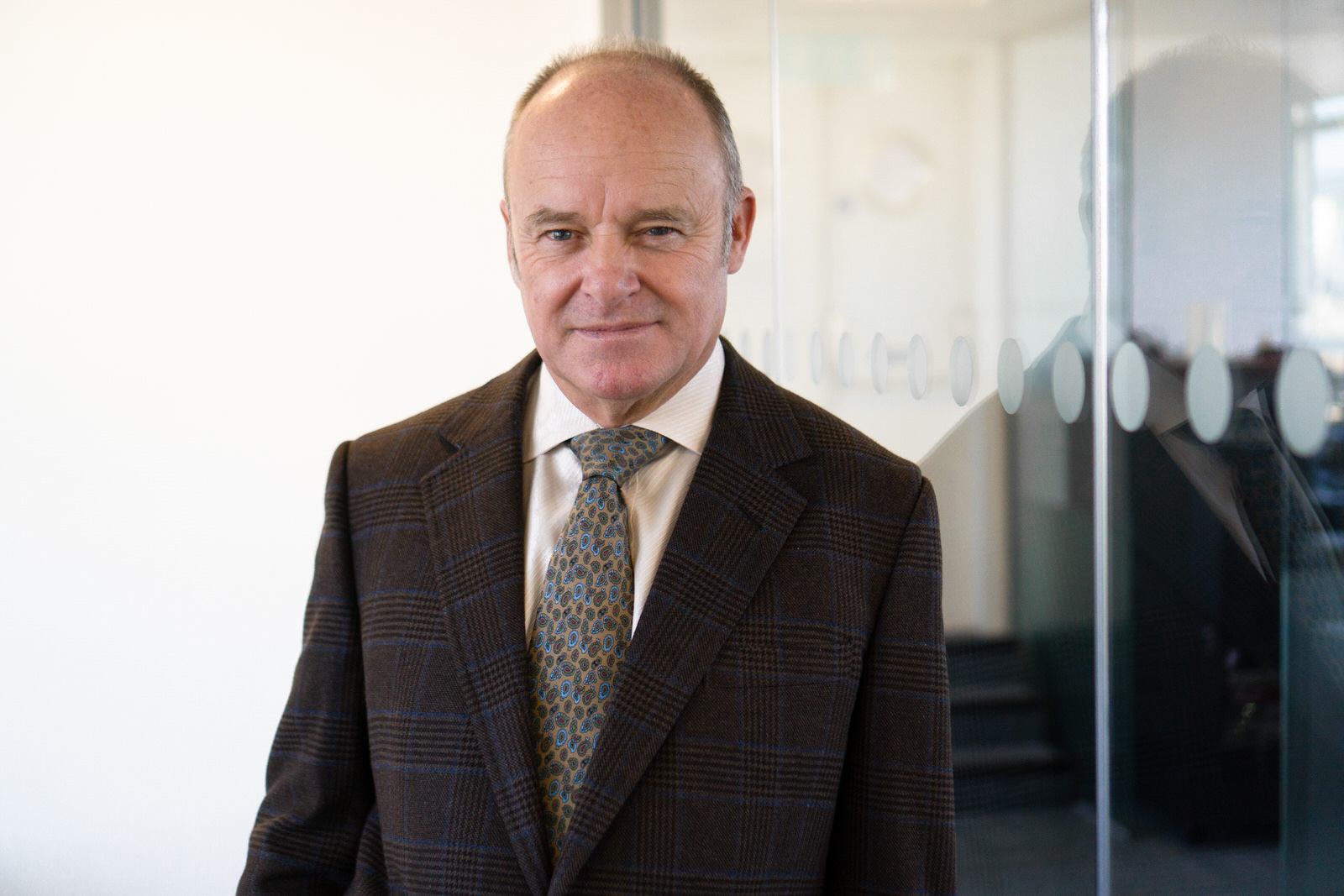
- Born: 15 May 1955 (age 71); Middleton, Lancashire, England
- Education: Royton and Crompton School; Oldham College
- Alma mater: Manchester Polytechnic
- Occupation: Businessman
- Years active: 1976 to present
- Known for: Seagram acquisition, divestment of Pillsbury and Burger King businesses
- Board member of: Compass; FedEx Corporation; Unilever; Avanti Communications; McDonald's Corporation
- Spouse: Julie Lewis Walsh (18 May 2013 – present)

Paul Steven Walsh (born 15 May 1955) is an English business executive who is the executive chairman of the McLaren Group. He was the chief executive officer of Diageo, the world's largest whisky company, between 2000 and 2013.

Walsh was criticised in the press for what was seen as his excessive remuneration, but received admiration for his ability to build brands. He spent the majority of his career at Diageo and its precursor Grand Metropolitan. His most notable decision was the acquisition of the Seagram drinks company, which added Captain Morgan rum and Crown Royal Canadian whisky to Diageo's roster of brands.

Walsh's tenure in charge of Diageo closely mirrored his behaviour as head of the Pillsbury food business: selling off non-essential assets such as Burger King and aggressively marketing a select number of "core" brands. He was disciplined regarding prices paid for the acquisition of assets. Towards the end of his Diageo career, he increased the company's exposure to developing markets such as India and China.

In February 2014 Walsh became the non-executive chairman of Compass Group, the world's largest catering company. His role as an advisor to Diageo ended in September 2014.

== Early life ==
Walsh was born in Middleton, and raised in the former mill town of Chadderton, Lancashire, in the North West of England. The only child of Arthur and Anne Walsh, his father was a pipe fitter who later ran a small thermal engineering company, and his mother was a housewife. Walsh believes that he inherited his work ethic from his father, his organisational skills from his mother, and his confidence from both parents, who he has described as "strict" but "loving". His great grandfather emigrated from Ireland, hence he bears the common Irish surname of Walsh.

Walsh was educated at his local comprehensive, the Royton and Crompton School, followed by Oldham College. He initially aspired to become a fighter pilot after becoming influenced by his "hero", a mathematics teacher who had been in the Royal Air Force during World War II. Walsh gained his pilot licence, but failed the medical examination to fly fighter jets due to colour blindness.

Instead, Walsh took a sandwich degree in accounting and economics at Manchester Polytechnic in 1973, with a work placement at the Co-operative Group's soft drinks operation. He did not enjoy accounting, but reasoned that the skill would provide a good gateway into business. He moved to London to work for International Computers Limited, and later the American Eaton Corporation, a manufacturer of industrial equipment, which he says he learnt a "can-do attitude".

== Career ==
=== Grand Metropolitan ===
Walsh joined London-based property and brewing conglomerate Grand Metropolitan (Grand Met) in 1982 as a financial planner and account manager for their brewing division Watney, Mann & Truman. By 1984–5, at his request, he had moved into a sales and marketing role. In 1986 he became the brewing division's chief financial officer (CFO), where he came to the attention of Grand Met's chairman Allen Sheppard after he reformed the financial reporting system.

In 1987, Walsh moved to New York to become CFO of Grand Met's 100 property-strong Intercontinental Hotels division. There he was tasked with acquiring properties, but having arrived at the height of what he identified as a real estate bubble, he argued that, "at that price we should be selling, not buying". Walsh also believed that the hotel group utilised an excessive amount of working capital. In 1988, he helped to negotiate the sale of the chain for $2.3 billion in cash (a price to earnings ratio of 52) to the Saison Group, in what he later described as "the deal of the decade". Even before the bubble burst, it was suggested that the Japanese company was overpaying for the chain; one analyst described their valuation of Intercontinental as "off the chart". Saison sold the chain in 1998 for $2.8 billion, having added a further 87 hotels.

Following the divestment, Walsh joined Grand Met's US-headquartered food division as CFO. In 1989, Grand Met used the proceeds from the Intercontinental sale to initiate a hostile takeover of Pillsbury, owner of the Green Giant and Häagen-Dazs brands, for $5.7 billion. The Grand Met offer was held by analysts to be a generous one for a struggling company that was under-performing in its industry. Walsh subsequently admitted to overvaluing the Green Giant vegetables division. Grand Met was attempting to diversify, and was attracted to Pillsbury's brands, which they believed held under-exploited potential for international growth. Writing in Businessweek, Mark Maremont accused Pillsbury of being "lax" in exploiting Häagen-Dazs' potential overseas. Walsh said:

We thought Pillsbury had powerful brands, but it had kind of lost its way. We felt we could leverage its brands and its technologies. They had under-resourced their R&D and done a number of things to make the number, make the number. Cost reduction is a way of life, but you have to be responsible about it. You have to protect the seed today because that will be the tree that bears fruit in the future. I don't think Pillsbury had done that.

In January 1992 Walsh was made chief executive of Pillsbury, in addition to his job as CFO of the Grand Met food division. A Star Tribune profile described him as "a boy-wonder [with] traits of boldness, curiosity and financial wizardry". Walsh identified the various divisions of Pillsbury as poorly integrated and reined in their independence to make them more accountable to head office. He also invested heavily in research and development, technology, IT systems and marketing.

Concentrating the company on consumer food, in 1994 he sold the Alpo pet food business to Nestlé for $510 million in cash. In February 1995 he participated in Grand Met's friendly takeover of Pet, Inc., the makers of Old El Paso branded Tex-Mex foods, for $2.6 billion. A number of analysts feared at the time that Grand Met had overpaid for the company, and was taking on too much debt, but Walsh defended the acquisition, arguing, "we are paying a fair price for attractive brands", adding that he had faith in the continued growth of the Tex-Mex food sector. In October 1995 he joined the Grand Met board of directors and assumed additional responsibility for Grand Met's Paris-based European food operations. In 1996 he was made chairman and president of Pillsbury. Investors Chronicle described Pillsbury as "well managed" under his leadership. Walsh was credited with re-energising the company, and operating profits grew from $250 million to $660 million between 1992 and 1996.

=== Diageo ===
In 1997, Grand Met merged with Guinness, a major drinks concern, and the new company was named Diageo. In 1999 Walsh returned to England, and was elected chief operating officer of Diageo in January 2000, and CEO in September 2000. He took over a company that had stagnated since its merger three years earlier, and that The Economist deemed "mediocre". As head of Diageo he transformed the consumer goods company into a streamlined premium drinks business. Walsh said:

"While Diageo had positions in drinks, that leadership was marginal – capital was not limitless. My view, supported by colleagues on the board, was that we should focus on where we can be a global leader. We couldn't aspire to that in food – that slot was taken by the Unilevers and Nestlés and Krafts of this world – but we could command that position in premium drinks."

Walsh identified drinks as the central Diageo business, and began selling off assets that did not fit this model. He sold Pillsbury to General Mills in 2001 for $10.1 billion, and Burger King to the private equity firm Texas Pacific Group in 2002 for $1.5 billion. In a strategy to bolster Diageo's drinks sales, in 2001 he acquired the Seagram drinks business from Vivendi Universal in conjunction with Pernod Ricard for $8.2 billion, an action that was later credited with refocusing and re-energising Diageo. At the time, analysts suggested that Walsh had overpaid, and that Pernod Ricard had gained control of the better brands. Despite having entered into an alliance with Pernod in order to avoid regulatory issues, Diageo was still forced to divest the Malibu Rum brand after acquiring Captain Morgan. Walsh defended the deal on the basis of efficiency savings and the fact that the deal was almost entirely financed by the sale of Pillsbury. Of the acquisition he says:

We moved in on that Seagram deal and forced their hand very quickly while our competitors were still trying to get their act together. If you look at what we paid it will go down in history as the bargain of the century. It was an $8.1bn total price of which our part was about $5.6bn and it was at economic profit break even at the end of year two. It’s produced phenomenal returns. If you look at Pernod’s Allied Domecq acquisition, it is 30 per cent higher in multiple terms and you’re not getting as good a collection of brands.

The Seagram deal cemented Diageo's decision to focus on drinks, and strengthened its leadership position in the key US market by adding Captain Morgan rum and Crown Royal Canadian whisky to the company's portfolio of products.

Walsh announced plans to grow Diageo by winning market share from wine and beer makers, introducing innovative new products and by cutting costs.

Inspired by the success of Smirnoff Ice, Walsh invested heavily in ready to drink products, termed "alcopops" by the British press. However, with the exception of Smirnoff Ice, none of the new products developed by Diageo was able to establish itself in the marketplace, and the alcopop trend was quickly dubbed a "fad" by the media. Some of these failures proved costly: Captain Morgan Gold lost £24 million for the company in 2002.

Diageo acquired the Bushmills Irish whiskey brand and distillery from Pernod Ricard for €295 million in 2005. In 2008 Diageo acquired a 50 per cent stake in the Ketel One brand for US$900 million.

Walsh received an Honorary Doctorate from Heriot-Watt University in 2009.

In 2011, Walsh threatened to move Diageo's headquarters away from the United Kingdom, following the introduction of a 50 per cent income tax rate for high earners. He said: "I believe the 50 per cent tax rate will lead to the long-term damage of this nation’s competitive edge." In 2012, Walsh criticised the Cameron government again, suggesting that the London Olympics ought to have been followed up with greater infrastructure spending to tackle unemployment.

In May 2013, Walsh announced that he would be stepping down as the chief of Diageo in September, but would stay with the company as an advisor until June 2014 to aid the transition process.

=== Reception and appraisal ===
Walsh has repeatedly spoken of the need for companies to genuinely be socially responsible.

Under Walsh's management, Diageo has been careful to "manage for value", and to avoid overpaying for assets. According to Nick Goodway of The Independent, Walsh "has been canny in allowing others to bid for the really big rivals and then pick up the brands that fall out of those deals cheaply". Walsh has been criticised for his decision to exit the Indian spirits market in 2002 by disposing of Gilbey's Green Label, a strategy which he reversed in 2012 with the acquisition of a stake in United Spirits. David Wighton commented in The Times that Diageo's acquisition of United Spirits had seen the company's owner, Vijay Mallya, "utterly outmanoeuvred by a canny rival prepared to play the long game."

William Hopper, a former director of merchant bank Morgan Grenfell, described Walsh as a "bean counter", and criticised the size of his salary. In 2012, one leading Diageo shareholder said, "We have a very, very positive view of this company and Paul Walsh as well. We do not have a problem with [his] pay."

=== Other responsibilities ===
In addition to his responsibilities at Diageo, Walsh has been a non-executive director at FedEx Corporation since 1996, at Unilever since 2009, and at Avanti Communications since 2012. From 1991 - 2007 he was a non-executive director of Control Data Corporation and its successor company Ceridian. He sat on the board of General Mills from 2000 until 2004, stepping down after Diageo reduced its stake in the company. He was a non-executive director of the energy company Centrica from March 2003 until May 2009. He is former chairman of the governors at Henley Management College. He became a council member of the Scotch Whisky Association in 2001 and served as its chairman from 2008 until 2011. During 2012 he was a member of David Cameron's Business Advisory Group. In August 2013, Walsh joined the United Spirits board.

== Personal life ==
Walsh was described by Philippe Naughton in The Times as "tall, paunchy, balding and thickset...[with] a burly confidence that exudes from every pore...a bluff Mancunian whose blokeish humour masks a fiercely competitive nature". Walsh claims to lead a "relatively modest" life that is dominated by work. At Diageo, he spent around half of his time in various foreign countries, totalling over 5 million air miles.

Walsh met Manchester-born Nicolette (Nikki) in London in 1978. They married in 1980 and have a son, Dean Paul Walsh. They separated in 2006.

In October 2012 it was reported that Walsh was engaged to marry his longterm girlfriend Julie Lewis, a public relations executive, and they married in May 2013.

Walsh is one of the highest-paid businessmen in Britain, earning £11.2 million between June 2011 and June 2012 from his work at Diageo. He lives near Horsham in West Sussex. He holds a minority stake in a 2,400-acre (970 ha) game ranch in South Africa, where he enjoys big game hunting.
