= Philip Maneval =

American composer and arts administrator (born 1956)

Philip Maneval (born 1956) is an American composer and arts administrator.

As a composer, Maneval has written more than 35 solo, chamber music and orchestral works which have been played by groups including the Chicago String Quartet and Miami String Quartet, and performed at the Marlboro Music Festival and Kimmel Center for the Performing Arts. As an administrator, Maneval is the longtime manager of the Philadelphia Chamber Music Society, and manager as well of the Marlboro Music School and Festival.

Maneval grew up in Leonia, New Jersey, and attended Leonia Alternative High School. He studied composition at the Oberlin Conservatory of Music and in the graduate school at the University of Pennsylvania. His teachers included Richard Wernick, George Crumb and George Rochberg. As of 2008, he lives in Swarthmore, Pennsylvania, with his wife and two children.
