= Mary Higgs =

British social reformer and writer

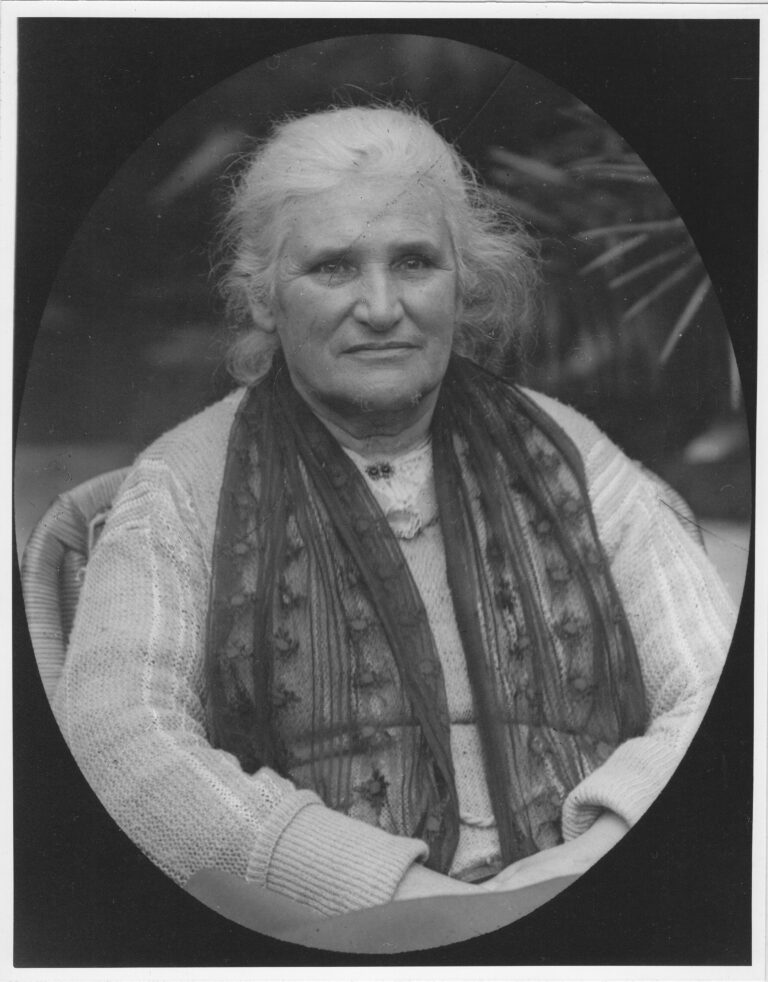
- Born: 2 February 1854; Devizes
- Died: 19 March 1937 (aged 83); Greenwich
- Alma mater: Girton College
- Occupation: Writer
- Awards: Officer of the Order of the British Empire

Mary Ann Higgs OBE, born Mary Ann Kingsland (1854–1937) was a British writer and social reformer who was associated with the town of Oldham and housing for women. Her works include Oldham's Garden Suburb and the Twentieth Century New Testament.

== Life ==
Higgs was born in Devizes, Wiltshire. She was the first child born to Caroline (née Paddon) and William Kingsland. Her father was a Congregational minister and in 1862, his work took the family north to Bradford. Higgs had two younger siblings.

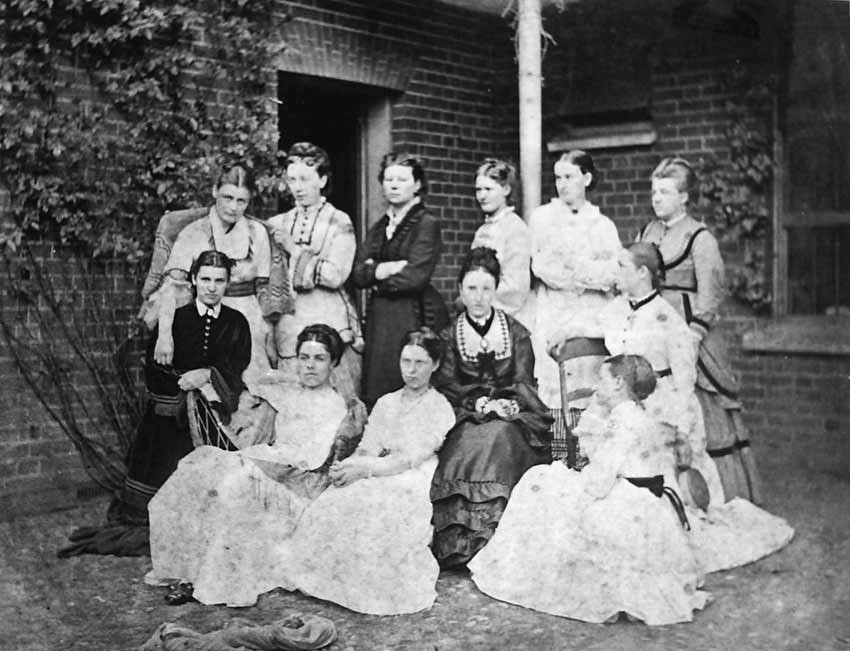
Mary Kingsland, left of middle row, with fellow Girton College students

Higgs was chosen to be one of the pupils at the College for Women in Hitchin in 1871. Two years later, the college moved to Cambridge to become Girton College. Higgs was a founding student of Girton and the first woman to sit the university's natural science tripos. She was not awarded a Cambridge degree due to her gender, but was employed as an assistant lecturer at Girton.

Higgs was the founder of the Beautiful Oldham Society, and she is credited with inspiring the creation of Oldham's Garden Suburb, intended to high quality but affordable housing.

She initiated the project of translating the New Testament into contemporary language that resulted in the Twentieth Century New Testament.

Higgs's campaigning gained attention when she disguised herself as a homeless woman to investigate the options available to them. The resulting book "Where Shall She Live?", co-written with Edward Heyward, was published in 1910. She also co-founded the National Association of Women's Lodging Houses and produced pamphlets to highlight the limited housing options open to women.

== Personal life ==
Higgs married Congregational minister Reverend Thomas Kilpin Higgs in 1879. They shared four children. Higgs joined Thomas when he moved to Staffordshire, Manchester, then Oldham for his work – in Oldham, Thomas led the Greenacres Congregational Church from 1891 to his death in 1907.

== Death and legacy ==
Higgs died in 1937, the same year that she was given an OBE. In 2009, the Oldham community celebrated the centenary of the Garden Suburb. In 2011, Oldham’s Pupil Support and Specialist Learning Centre was renamed Kingsland School to honour her contribution to the town.
