= Twentieth Century New Testament =

English translation of the New Testament

The Twentieth Century New Testament (TCNT) is an English translation of the New Testament. Originally published in three parts between 1898 and 1901, it is considered the first translation of the Bible into present-day English. After further revisions based on suggestions from readers, the final version was published in 1904.

== History ==
The Twentieth Century New Testament was inspired by Mary Higgs and Edward Malan who wanted to see the New Testament written in contemporary language. Higgs was a writer also known for her work with homeless women and Malan was a signal and telegraph engineer.

The translation was produced in Britain over a period of 15 years by a group of approximately 20 people. Although they were all fluent in the "koine" Greek of the New Testament, the translators were not professional scholars but a varied cross section of society—ministers, housewives, school teachers, railroad workers, and businessmen. However they shared the desire (as the Preface to their work puts it), "to do for the English nation what has been done already for the people of almost all other countries -- to enable Englishmen to read the most important part of their Bible in that form of their own language which they themselves use."

As the project progressed J. Rendel Harris and Richard Francis Weymouth, two well known scholars of the time, voluntarily advised the group and helped in ensuring scholarly integrity. Also, translation was done using the then-cutting edge Westcott and Hort text of the Greek New Testament, further adding to the accuracy of their rendering.

The people involved included W.T.Stead, Mary Higgs and Edwatd Malan.

In a break with most translations, the TCNT arranges the New Testament books in the order scholars believe they were written – Mark comes before Matthew, for instance. They also include brief introductions before each book. Because of the translators' meticulous attention to the best scholarship of their day, Bruce Metzger concluded that their version still holds up remarkably well today, despite the lapse of over 100 years.

== 2010 Revision ==
A modern revision of the TCNT called the Open English Bible was released in 2010 as a public domain (Creative Commons CC0 license) work.
