= Limeside =

Coordinates: 53.519°N 2.127°W

- Location within Greater Manchester
- OS grid reference: SD916025
- Metropolitan borough: Oldham
- Metropolitan county: Greater Manchester
- Region: North West
- Country: England
- Sovereign state: United Kingdom
- Post town: OLDHAM
- Postcode district: OL8
- Dialling code: 0161
- Police: Greater Manchester
- Fire: Greater Manchester
- Ambulance: North West
- UK Parliament: Oldham West and Royton

Limeside is a large housing estate in Oldham, Greater Manchester, England, 2 miles south of the town centre in the Hollinwood ward, contiguous with Failsworth, Hollins and Garden Suburb. Daisy Nook countryside park lies to the south.

Whitebank Stadium, home of Oldham R.L.F.C. and North West Counties League football club Avro F.C., is in Limeside. Hollinwood Cemetery lies immediately west of the estate.

== History ==
Archaically known as Lime Side, the area now occupied by the estate once constituted a hamlet and farmstead centred around Limeside Farm on the eastern edge of the Hollinwood Common.

The northern part of the estate was built by the early 1930s. The 17.75 acre Limeside Park opened in 1932.

The Oldham Extension Act 1950 transferred 605 acres (2.45 km^{2}) of the Limehurst Rural District to the County Borough of Oldham, On abolition in 1954, the rural district was divided between the Borough of Ashton-under-Lyne (1,154 acres), County Borough of Oldham (1,052 acres), Failsworth Urban District (606 acres), Droylsden Urban District (235 acres) and the Borough of Mossley (37 acres). These developments allowed for the expansion of the estate in the 1950s into the former rural area.

== Education ==
Three primary schools serve the area. Holy Family RC Primary, Limehurst Primary and Oasis Academy Limeside. See List of schools in Oldham.

== Religion ==
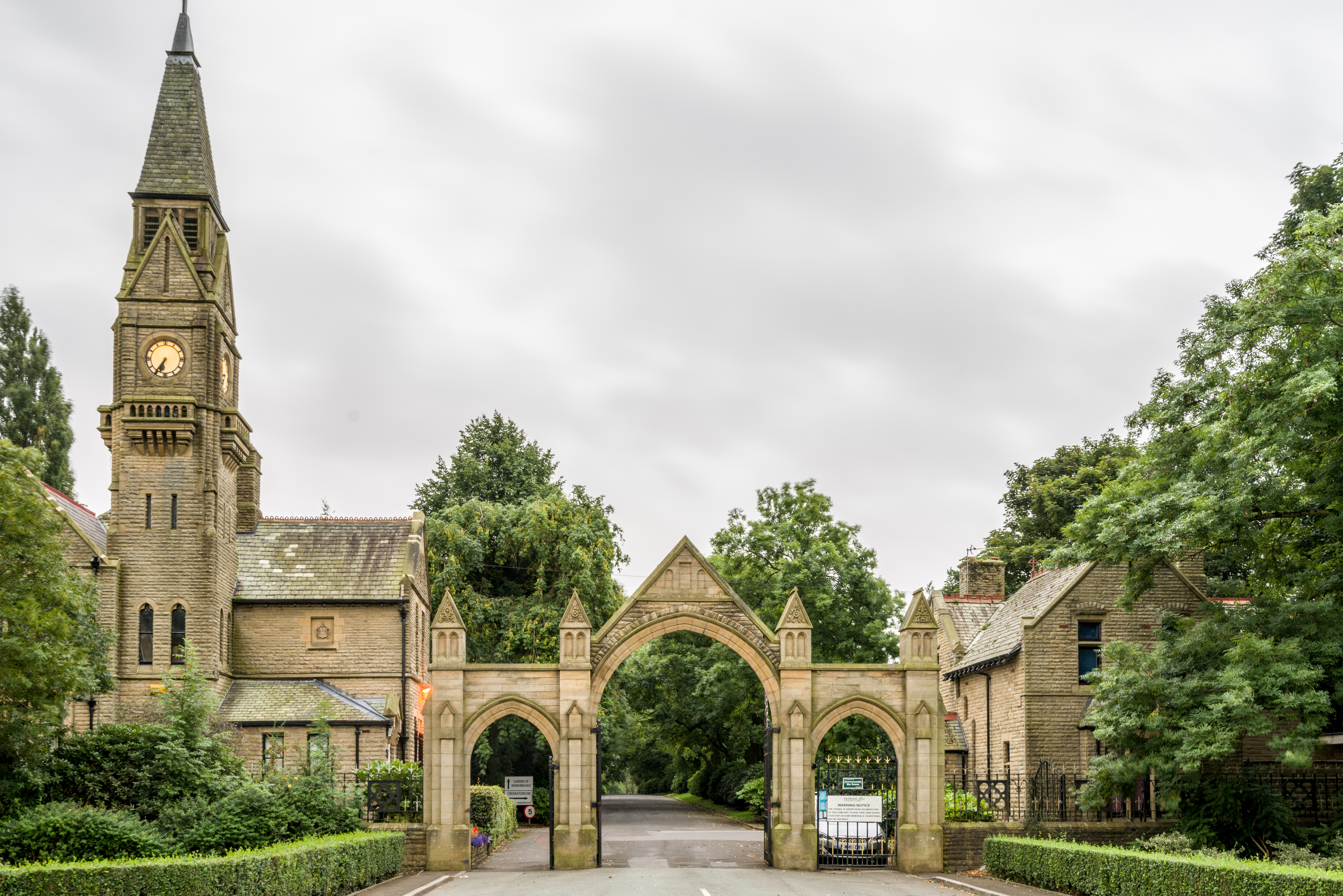
Entrance to Hollinwood Cemetery

Limeside is part of the Church of England parish of Hollinwood and Limeside in the Diocese of Manchester. The area was formerly served by St Chad's in Limeside between 1953 and 2002, however constant vandalism of the church building led to its closure and the decision to create a new parish of St Margaret, Hollinwood and St Chad, Limeside.

Limeside is a part of the Roman Catholic Parish of Holy Family, the church building being on Roman Road.

The area is also served by Limeside Methodist Church, founded in 1960.

== Transport ==
Stagecoach Manchester provide the following bus services in Limeside.

Service 76 to Oldham via Copster Hill and to Manchester via Failsworth and Newton Heath during the daytime and into the evening on Weekdays and Saturdays.

Service 74 to Oldham via Coppice and to Manchester via Hollinwood and Woodhouses during evenings and Sundays.

Service 183 to Royal Oldham Hospital via Coppice and Oldham.
