= The Brian Clarke Church of England Academy =

Church of England academy in Oldham, Greater Manchester, England

Location
- Booth Street; Oldham, Greater Manchester, OL9 6EF; England
- 53.546°N 2.1083°W

Information
- Type: Free school
- Motto: Latin: Luceat Lux Vestra (let your light shine)
- Religious affiliation: Church of England
- Established: 2022; 4 years ago
- Trust: Cranmer Education Trust
- Department for Education URN: 149137 Tables
- Ofsted: Reports
- Chair of Governors: Ann Flatman
- Headteacher: Allison Ash
- Gender: Co-educational
- Age: 11 to 16
- Enrolment: 240
- Capacity: 1,200
- Website: www.brian-clarke.org

The Brian Clarke Church of England Academy is a co-educational Church of England free school, located in the town centre of Oldham, Greater Manchester, England.

The school caters to pupils aged 11–16 (Key Stage 3 & Key Stage 4). It was temporarily located at The Blue Coat School, whilst construction on the purpose-built new school complex was completed. The school moved into the new building in May 2023.

The school is named after the artist Sir Brian Clarke, painter and stained-glass designer, who was born in Oldham. The motto of the school is Luceat lux vestra, from Matthew 5:16: "Let your light shine".

== History ==
In 2018, the CEO of the Cranmer Education Trust, Julie Hollis, applied to the Department for Education for a new secondary school in Oldham. The name of the proposed school, the Brian Clarke Academy, was revealed in November 2020, together with the school crest, motto, and launch of the school's website. Planning permission for the purpose-built school building, designed by architectural practice Faulkner Browns and to be constructed by construction company Willmott Dixon, was granted in April 2021. The school officially opened in September 2022 and is due to be at full capacity in September 2026.

== See also ==
- The Blue Coat School
- List of schools in Oldham
