= School Without Walls =

School Without Walls may refer to:

- School Without Walls (Washington, D.C.)
- School Without Walls (Rochester)
- School Without Walls (Live Oak, Florida)
- School Without Walls (Canberra), Australia
