= Fitton Hill =

Housing estate in Oldham, Greater Manchester, England

Coordinates: 53.522°N 2.103°W

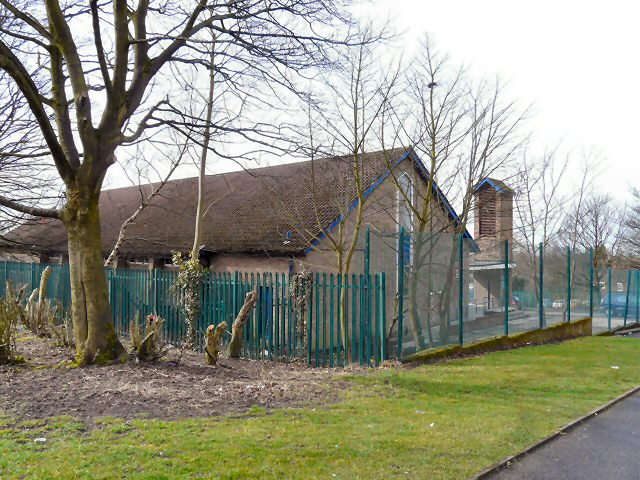
- The church of the Holy Rosary

- Location within Greater Manchester
- OS grid reference: SD932028
- Metropolitan borough: Oldham
- Metropolitan county: Greater Manchester
- Region: North West
- Country: England
- Sovereign state: United Kingdom
- Post town: OLDHAM
- Postcode district: OL8
- Dialling code: 0161
- Police: Greater Manchester
- Fire: Greater Manchester
- Ambulance: North West
- UK Parliament: Oldham West and Royton

Fitton Hill is a large housing estate in the town of Oldham in Greater Manchester, contiguous with Hathershaw and Bardsley.

Lying 2 miles south of Oldham town centre, the Fitton Hill estate was built during the 1950s and 1960s on previously undeveloped moorland with scattered hamlets and farmsteads. The layout of the estate obliterated all traces of the old landscape.

Two churches once served the area, the Roman Catholic church of Holy Rosary and St Cuthbert's, Church of England. St Cuthbert's was demolished in 2022 to make way for new-build houses. The Holy Rosary, opened in 1955, contains a significant mural by George Mayer-Marton and is a very important piece of local heritage, having achieved a SAVE Britain's Heritage Grade II listing in 2022. See The Oldham Mural

Three primary schools serve the area, Medlock Valley Community School, St Martin's School and Holy Rosary RC Primary. See List of schools in Oldham.

Spark Oldham CIC is a local Community Interest Company that sits at the heart of Fitton Hill and supports local residents through various means, such as HAF provisions, crisis support, and their Second Chance shop for giving donated items a new home.

Fitton hill also has its own growing hub called Local Food First CIC that provides locally grown fruit and vegetables at an affordable rate to people in the community. Local Food First also support the HAF programme in collaboration with Spark.

== History ==
Archaically lying in the Knott Lanes division of Ashton township, Fitton Hill anciently constituted a farmstead, one of several once lying within the area built upon by the estate. All the hamlets and farms have now gone but place-names such as Deanshut and Marland Fold survived in the guise of street names and schools in the area.

The former Fitton Hill farm dated from as early as 1618 when an Edmund Fitton was recorded as residing there.

From 1894 the area around Fitton Hill was part of the civil parish of Bardsley in the Limehurst Rural District until its abolition in 1954, when its territory was divided between the towns of Oldham and Ashton Under Lyne.

== Transport ==
Bee Network operate the following services at Fitton Hill

426 to Oldham.

396 to Ashton Under Lyne and to Middleton via Chadderton.

824 to Bardsley- this is a students-only bus.
