= The Hathershaw College =

Coordinates: 53.5221°N 2.1118°W

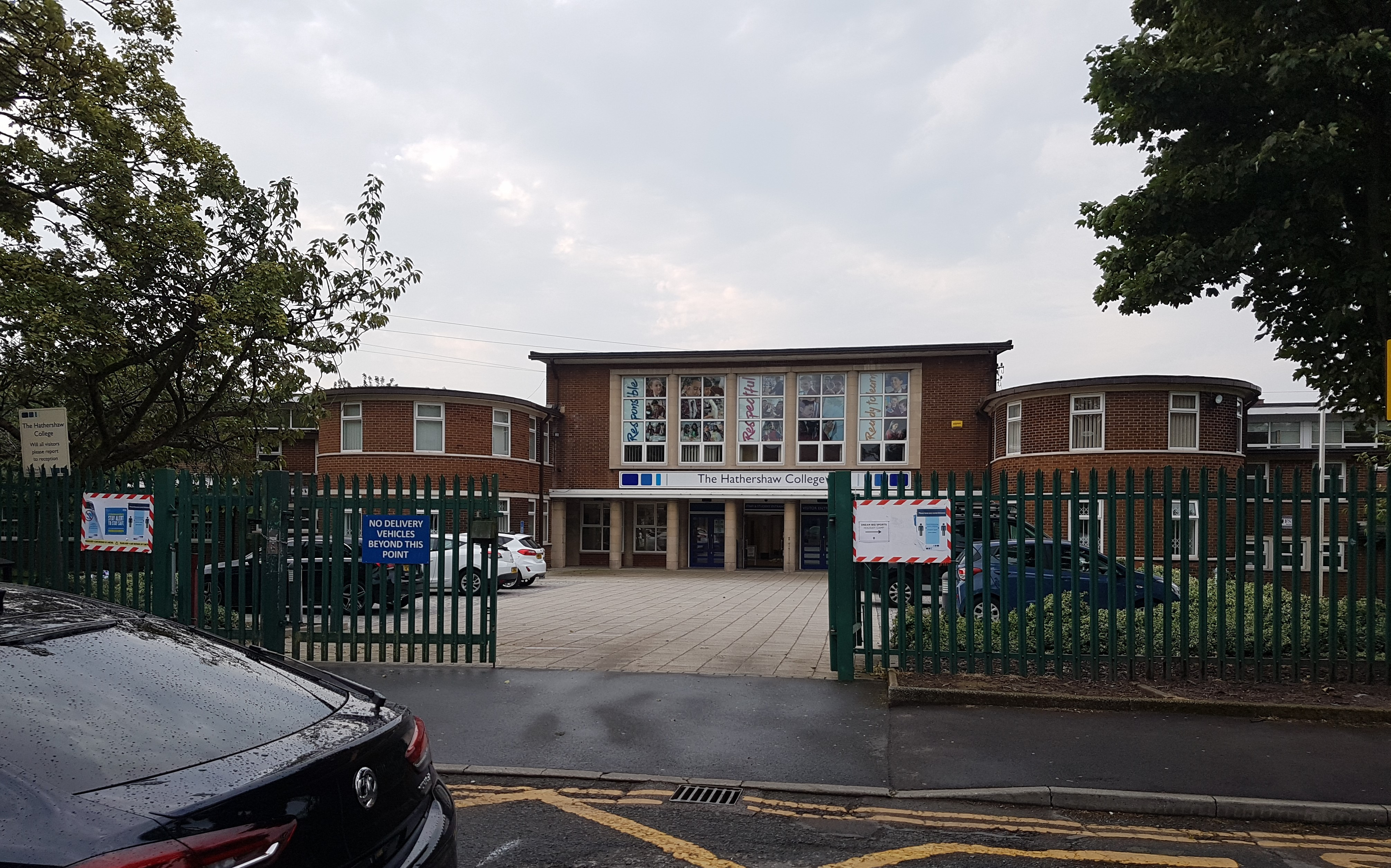

Location
- Bellfield Avenue; Hathershaw; Oldham, Greater Manchester, OL8 3EP; England

Information
- Type: Secondary Academy College
- Motto: Together We Succeed – historically: Agendo Discere Agere Discendo, "Learning to Learn by Doing"
- Established: 1955
- Department for Education URN: 137039 Tables
- Ofsted: Reports
- Headteacher: Susie Fraser
- Gender: Mixed
- Age: 11 to 16
- Enrolment: 1029
- Houses: Potts, Baker, Williams/Goodwin, Easton
- Website: https://www.hathershaw.org.uk/

The Hathershaw College is a coeducational, Secondary Academy for 11- to 16-year-olds in Oldham, Greater Manchester, England.

In 2007, Ofsted rated the school as "good". In 2010, Ofsted described it as "good with outstanding features". In 2014, the school was judged to be requiring improvement overall. In 2016, Ofsted described the school as "good". In 2021, Ofsted confirmed that the school remained "good".In 2026, Ofsted reported a mixed outcome across inspection areas

== History ==
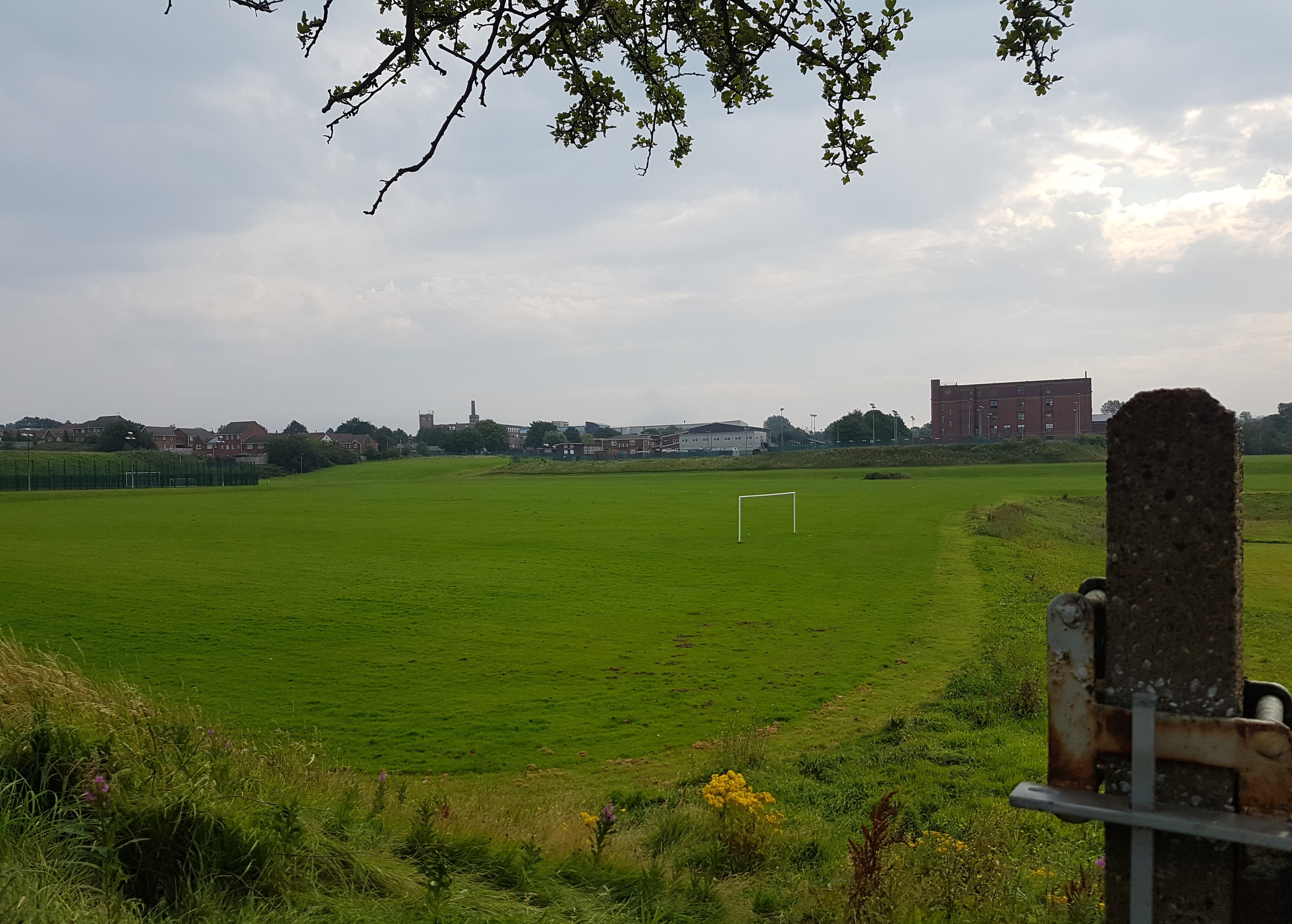
Playing fields of Hathershaw College, the college buildings are in the centre background

As the 'Hathershaw Technical High School', it opened in 1955 with a selective intake. The school was housed in three blocks (a main building, a science block, and a craft/engineering block). The school was sponsored by the aviation manufacturer Avro, and the ground plan of the main building was inspired by the outline of a Lancaster bomber. It competed for intake with Oldham's state grammar schools but offered a more technical syllabus. Provision of equipment and machinery for metalwork and woodwork was considered to be among the finest available nationally.

In 1966, the school became a co-educational comprehensive school. In 1970, it was reorganised as an 'upper school' for pupils aged 14–18, supplied by two separate 'lower schools', Greenhill and Fitton Hill. These feeder schools, which were on sites significantly distant from each other and from Hathershaw School, educated pupils from 11 to 14 years of age. During the 1977–78 academic year, the system was reorganised again, and Hathershaw catered for the full 11–18 age range, with sixth form entry. The loss of selective entry in 1966 and the split-site feeder system led to a period of falling academic attainment. The trend was reversed following the appointment of John Cole as headteacher in 1976, who has been credited with having "transformed Hathershaw School".

In 1981, Oldham's first joint school/community sports hall was built. In a 1992 reorganisation, the school became an 11–16 institution, with its sixth form transferred to Oldham Sixth Form College. In December 1999, it was recognised by the government as one of the 50 most improved secondary schools in the country.

In September 2000, the school became a Technology College and, in May 2003, was admitted to the Specialist Schools Trust "Value Added" club for significantly improving examination results between Key Stage 2 and Key Stage 4. In November 2004, the school received more than £1 million in lottery funding to improve its sports facilities. Hathershaw became the first dual-specialism school in England in March 2005, specialising in both sport and technology. In October 2005, the school opened a £350,000 netball complex.

The Ofsted inspection of November 2007 gave the school an overall rating of "good". In November 2010, the school was revisited by Ofsted and described as "good with outstanding features".

In 2009, The school was the subject of allegations concerning possible breaches of GCSE examination regulations. Local media reported claims that some students were removed from examination rooms without authorisation, that class teachers invigilated their own subjects, and that some candidates may have had access to unauthorised materials. Examination boards Edexcel and AQA confirmed that they had received complaints and stated that investigations were under way at the time. The local authority said it was not

The school's newly developed 4G sports pitch

aware of any confirmed findings, and the allegations had not been proven.

On 1 August 2011, The Hathershaw College gained academy status.

In 2016, the College achieved its best GCSE results to date, with 60% of pupils gaining five A*–C grades including both English and Maths, above both local and national averages. This was equalled in 2017, despite the introduction of the new numerical GCSE grading system in Maths and English.

In April 2016, an Ofsted inspection rated the school as "good".

In 2025, the school received approximately £1.5 million in funding to upgrade its existing 3G sports pitch into a new 4G facility, enhancing both student and community access to high-quality outdoor sports provision.

The school was inspected by Ofsted on 14–15 April 2026; the lead inspector was Lisa Corrigan HMI. Accompanying the April 2026 inspection, Ofsted Parent View survey results showed that 61% of respondents would recommend the school to another parent. While a majority of parents (57%) agreed that their child was happy at the school, the survey also highlighted areas of significant concern, particularly regarding support for students with Special Educational Needs and Disabilities (SEND), where 55% of respondents disagreed that the school provided necessary support.

The school was judged to meet the expected standard in attendance and behaviour, inclusion, and personal development and wellbeing, and to require attention in the areas of achievement, curriculum and teaching, and leadership and governance.

On 1 July 2026, Susie Fraser announced changes to the school uniform policy, due to take effect on 3 September 2026. The changes include redesigned ties, with each year group assigned a different colour to allow students’ year groups to be identified more easily. The announcement also introduced the role of “Director of Year”, which will be implemented from 3 September 2026.

== Changes in name ==
Though an educational establishment in continuous operation from 1955, it has had a number of changes of name:

- Hathershaw Technical High School (1955–1966)
- Hathershaw Comprehensive School (1966–2000)
- Hathershaw College of Technology and Sport (2000–2011)
- The Hathershaw College (2011–)

== Headteachers/Principals of Hathershaw School/College ==
- Charles Clifford Bell, 1955–1967
- John Hemmings, 1967–1976
- John H. S. Cole, 1976–1988 (left his post as Oldham's assistant director of education to take on the school's headship)
- Averil Cunnington (temporary appointment), 1988, later headteacher of Counthill School
- Mr C. Midgely, 1988–1999
- Mr C. W. Edney, 1999–2003
- David M. Ashley, 2003–2005 (left to become headteacher at Parrs Wood Technology College)
- Carol Cawkwell, 2005–2014 (change of formal title to Principal)
- David Jack McEntee, 2014–2019 (decision to take early retirement)
- Mark David Giles, 2019–12 December 2025 (left to take up role as Director of Educational Consultancy at Life Changing Education)
- Robert Logan (temporary appointment), 12 December 2025 – 20 April 2026
- Susie Fraser (Former Director of Education at Greater Manchester Academies Trust) 20 April 2026 – Incumbent

== Emblem and logo history ==
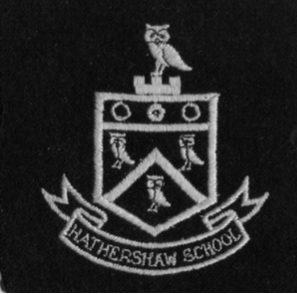
Blazer badge, mid 1970s

The logo of the college in 2008

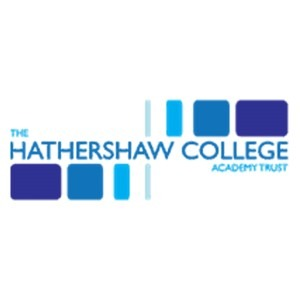
The logo in 2016

A variant of the 2016 logo

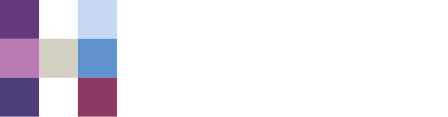
Current college logo used since 2021

== Controversies (recent) ==
Exam Irregularities (2009)

In 2009, The school was the subject of an investigation concerning alleged breaches of GCSE examination regulations. Reports indicated that some students may have received assistance in circumstances that contravened standard examination procedures. Specifically, allegations included claims that pupils were removed from examination rooms without independent supervision and that a teacher may have remained with students in an unauthorised setting. The examination boards involved, AQA and Edexcel, confirmed that they had received complaints and were conducting investigations at the time. While the full outcomes of these investigations were not publicly disclosed, the incident attracted local media attention and scrutiny over the college’s examination oversight.

Staff Suspensions Related to Attendance Figures (2009)

Also in 2009, two senior members of staff were suspended following concerns regarding the accuracy of the school’s reported attendance figures. Local media reported that the suspensions related to claims that attendance data had been manipulated, as the reported absence rates were higher than local and national averages. The suspended staff members included the deputy head and an assistant head of the college. The suspensions themselves were widely covered in the press, although subsequent details regarding any disciplinary outcomes were not extensively reported. The incident raised discussions in the community about transparency and administrative accountability in educational institutions.

Data Security Incident (2013)

Around 2013, Hathershaw College experienced a data security incident in which confidential student records were made publicly accessible online. The breach reportedly involved over 100 documents, including academic records, exclusion reports, and sensitive medical information. The files were subsequently removed from public access. The incident was noted in news reports as a significant privacy concern, highlighting the importance of secure handling of student data within educational institutions. The school addressed the breach following its discovery, although detailed follow-up reports were not widely published.

=== Ofsted inspection and criticism (2026) ===
Shortly after Susie Fraser’s appointment as principal, Hathershaw College was subject to an Ofsted inspection in April 2026, with the report published in June 2026. The report identified areas requiring improvement, including pupil achievement, curriculum and teaching, and leadership and governance. Ofsted reported that pupils had not achieved as well as expected over time and that changes introduced by leaders had not yet produced a sustained impact on outcomes. The findings attracted local attention, with the school and the Pinnacle Learning Trust stating that they accepted the areas identified for improvement and had plans in place to address them.

== Senior Leadership Team ==
- Headteacher: Susie Fraser
- Senior Vice Principal: Robert Logan
- Vice Principal: Ashley Travis
- Designated Safeguarding Lead: Nichola Baker
- Deputy Designated Safeguarding Lead: Patrick Harwood
- SENDCO: Sarah Robinson

=== Year Directors ===
- Year 7 Director: Miss M Howarth
- Year 8 Director: Mr A Allcock
- Year 9 Director: Miss K Ridgway
- Year 10 Director: Miss S Briscoe
- Year 11 Director: Mr M Adams

=== Year Managers ===
- Year 8 Manager: Charlotte Oxley
- Year 9 Manager: Lynne McAiney
- Year 10 Manager: Jemma Lawton
- Year 11 Manager: Sharon Blundell

== Notable staff (recent) ==
- Anjum Raza (Mr Raz) – Worked at The Hathershaw College for 25 years before leaving in July 2026.

Source: The Hathershaw College – "Bye Mr Raz!" (2026)

- Tony Jones – Physical Education teacher at the college from 1985 until 2015, later serving as a school governor.

Source: The Hathershaw College – Governors 2022–23

- Angela Easton – Assistant Principal who retired after more than 33 years at the college in 2025.

Source: The Hathershaw College – News (2025)

- Leigh O'Donnell – Former student of the school and are well known within the local community. They served as a year manager

Source: The Hathershaw College – Former Hathershaw Student Returns as Year Manager

- Mark Giles – Former principal of the school, worked at the college for 20 years and supported the school during the COVID-19 Pandemic

Source: The Hathershaw College – Mark Giles (2025)

- Heather May – Worked at The Hathershaw College for 33 years before leaving in 2017.

Source: Heather says farewell after 33 years

- Jane Fox – Taught at The Hathershaw College for 32 years before retiring in July 2016.

Source: Oldham Chronicle – "College bids farewell to top teacher" (2016)

== Staff numbers and pupil to teacher ratio ==
Headcount of all teachers – 66
Headcount of all teaching assistants – 41
Headcount of all support (exc. auxiliary) staff – 26
Pupil to teacher ratio = 16.6:1

== Notable former pupils ==
- Liz McInnes, former Labour MP for Heywood and Middleton.
- David Richards, TV director – This Is Personal: The Hunt for the Yorkshire Ripper, Emmerdale, Coronation Street, Crocodile Shoes etc.
- Colin Waldron, football player – played for Chelsea, Burnley, Manchester United and Sunderland football clubs.
- Daniel Ferris, Muay Thai Fighter – also competed in the WMF championships 2025 in Thailand,
