= Oldham College =

Coordinates: 53.543°N 2.120°W

Location
- Rochdale Road; Oldham, Greater Manchester, OL9 6AA; England

Information
- Type: Government funded further education
- Established: 1893; 133 years ago
- Local authority: Oldham
- Department for Education URN: 130505 Tables
- Ofsted: Reports
- Chair of the Board of Governors: Shaid Mushtaq
- Principal: Simon Jordan
- Gender: Co-educational
- Age: 16 to 19
- Website: www.oldham.ac.uk

Oldham College is a further education college in Oldham, Greater Manchester, England.

== History ==
Oldham College was established in 1893 after a donation from the Platt family, a famous textile machinery manufacturer. This led to the institution of the School of Art and Science in the town centre. It was situated on the junction of Ashcroft Street and the former Chapel Street, the site is now occupied by the Town Square Shopping Centre.

== Present day ==
Oldham College was inspected by Ofsted in 2019 and was rated good in all areas. Oldham College offer a range of courses, including vocational courses, T Levels, Apprenticeships, adult courses and university courses.

Around £45 million has been invested in upgrading or completely replacing facilities since 2012. In 2021, the latest new building – a £9M Construction Centre – was completed alongside the addition of a new £9M Health and Life Sciences Centre. Other recent changes include new simulation suites which mirror a real-life clinical hospital ward, nursery and care home.

== Notable alumni ==
- Suranne Jones – actress (Scott & Bailey)
- Sarah Lancashire – actress (Coronation Street)
- Jane Horrocks – actress (Little Voice and Absolutely Fabulous)
- Paul S. Walsh – CEO of Diageo plc
- Suzanne Shaw – singer (Hear'Say)
- Kelly Llorenna – singer (N-Trance)
- Danielle Nicholls – television presenter
- Steve Diggle – musician (Buzzcocks)
- Anthony Flanagan – actor
- Samantha Power – actress (Little Britain and Ackley Bridge)
- Kimberly Hart-Simpson – actress and businesswoman (Coronation Street)
