= Leonia Alternative High School =

Former school in Bergen County, New Jersey, U.S.

Location
- 305 Beechwood Place; Leonia, Bergen County, New Jersey 07605; United States
- 40.8637°N 73.9859°W

Information
- Type: public alternative school; high school
- Established: 1972
- Closed: 1979
- Grades: 9–12

The Leonia Alternative High School, sometimes known as LAHS, was an American public alternative school located in Leonia, New Jersey, United States, that existed between 1972 and 1979.

== Origins ==
Beginning with the free school movement of the 1960s, a number of different alternative education schemes were tried out in various locations within the United States. The Leonia Alternative High School was modeled after the Parkway Program, the influential alternative school project in Philadelphia that had begun in 1969 and had attracted national attention. While the Parkway Program often focused on vocational goals, the Leonia one was intended to be more academically oriented, while still breaking down some of the barriers typically seen between a school and the surrounding community. Creating an alternative school had the added benefit of taking some students out of the severely overcrowded regular Leonia High School, which had over 800 pupils attending a facility designed for only 500. With the support of the borough's Board of Education, the Leonia Alternative High School began in Fall 1972, becoming one of the first alternative high schools in New Jersey.

== Structure ==
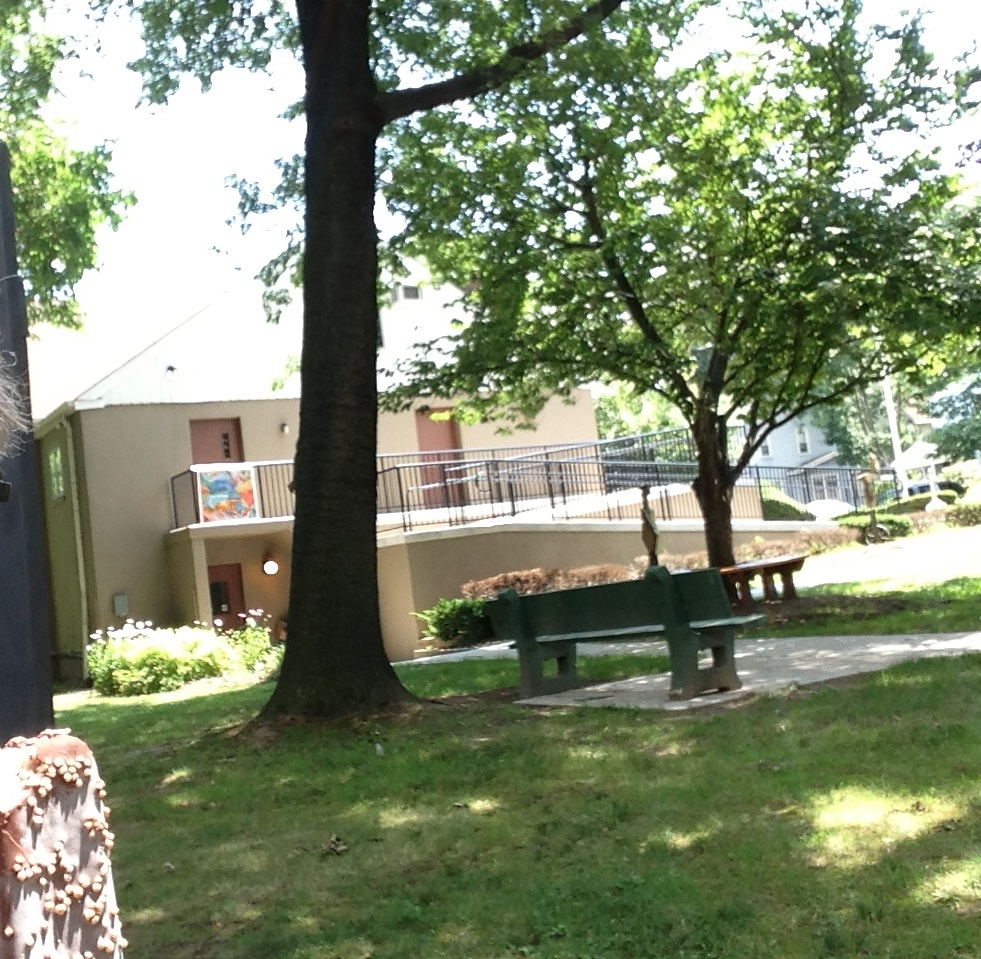
The Little House (as seen in 2013)

The alternative school was based in a municipally owned structure, known as the Little House, located on Beechwood Place, about 0.4 miles (0.6 km) from the regular high school building. The school employed up to four certified teachers, whom the students had a role in hiring. These teachers taught core subjects (including those required for graduation by the state of New Jersey), supervised community resource instructors, did organizational tasks, and acted as advisors to the students. Students were elected to an administrative council that helped govern the enterprise. As with other alternative schools of the time, informality and departures from the norm reigned: students called teachers by their first name, attendance was not kept, and letter grades were replaced by written evaluations. The school and its students also reflected the counterculture of the early 1970s: personal development took form in activities such as self-awareness and consciousness-raising.

While community classes taught by volunteers were one of the structural elements often employed by alternative schools, the Leonia project gave it special emphasis in order to take advantage of the significant number of college professors, writers, artists, and other professionals who were residents of Leonia. Community resource instructors giving classes at LAHS included the actor Alan Alda, the American studies scholar Sacvan Bercovitch, the geologist Charles H. Behre, and the anthropologists Morton Fried, Morton Klass, and Robert F. Murphy. Other community classes were given in their homes by resident biologists, psychologists, university administrators, writers, journalists, artists, and musicians. There were as many as fifty such people offering classes. Some of these classes taught various foreign languages, or explored the literature of different nationalities, or were related to sociology, or discussed alternate political systems. Other classes ranged farther afield, to subjects such as blues music, needlecraft, or psychoanalysis. Still others included gourmet cooking, kite-building, and oriental mysticism. Traditional gym classes were replaced by lessons in such things as yoga or meditation.

At its peak, the alternative school had around 80 students; at no point did it comprise more than ten percent of the overall high school population. In total, some 158 students attended the school during its existence.

== Views ==
The Leonia Alternative High School was controversial from the beginning. Over time, the existence of the school split the Leonia community, which was never as full of college professors as imagined, with some people viewing it as a great educational advancement while others viewed it with scorn. The alternative students were seen as an exclusive group of separatists, something they acknowledged at the time, as well as in retrospect. They and the regular high school students often viewed each other with suspicion and resentment.

The biggest opposition to the alternative school came from the Leonia Education Association, the teachers union that was part of the New Jersey Education Association. Planning for the new program had not gotten adequate buy-in from the teachers and administrators of the regular Leonia High School, and they objected to the alternative as a departure from the usual methods of running a school. This included what the union said was deficient oversight of student activities and excessively long days for some of those students. The regular teachers also thought the alternative school represented a possible loss of their jobs, should the practice of using unpaid community volunteers instead of paid teachers become more widespread. This organized opposition was unusual during the 1970s, because many alternative schools of the era were focused on rescuing difficult, troubled students, whom teachers were just as happy to have out of their classrooms. But as it worked out, the Leonia alternative school was not attracting those kind of students, but rather was capturing many of the most creative and academically strong students in the population, ones who were either unmotivated by normal curricula or who were unhappy with the social aspects of regular high school. And the regular school teachers resented losing these students. In 1973, the Leonia Education Association filed a lawsuit against the Leonia Board of Education for the use of unlicensed and uncertified people in school instruction; the suit petitioned the state commissioner of education to enjoin the alternative school from further operation.

Meanwhile, many of the alternative students prospered in the school, especially if they were motivated and self-disciplined. The lack of formal grades did not interfere with the college application process, as LAHS students were accepted by a number of Ivy League and other selective colleges. Two decades later, many of the alternative students looked back upon the school with considerable appreciation for the experience. As one alternative student recalled, "This was one of the most intense and indelible experiences of my life. It felt like we were in this new world that we had a part in creating." This feeling resembled the conclusion, albeit from the opposite perspective, of the regular school teachers, who had written critically of the students leaving it for the alternative school, saying they were "exiting ... into their own semiprivate utopias."

== End ==
The Leonia Education Association suit dragged on for years, with various twists and turns, procedural delays, and a prolonged debate over what the word employ meant. There was rapid growth in the number of alternative schools in operation nationwide during this time, and while conventional–alternative school conflicts did happen in some other districts, it was unusual for one to escalate to the state level. Private citizens joined on both sides of the suit: those against the school included a politician who during this time was elected mayor of Leonia, and those defending the school included the Education Law Center. Supporters of the alternative school also brought in the American Civil Liberties Union, and there was a legal battle over whether as an intervenor it was allowed to intervene.

The state commissioner of education ruled in 1976 that the alternative school could not continue to use community resource people in the way they were doing. The Leonia Board of Education decided not to further pursue the case. The alternative school, while still existing, was moved into the regular high school facility, and the use of community volunteers all but dropped. An analytical account of the school's rise and fall was published by Vicki Karant, a founding core teacher in the school, in The Phi Delta Kappan.

Nonetheless, a group of Leonia citizens had filed an appeal of the ruling. In 1978, the New Jersey State Board of Education reversed the previous decision of the education commissioner and allowed the alternative school to use unpaid volunteers as instructors, as long as they were under minimal levels of supervision by certified teachers. However, the decision had little effect on the alternative school, which by then was down to 35 full-time students. The Leonia Alternative High School ended for good in 1979.

== Notable alumni ==
- Paul Collins, musician
- David Klass, screenwriter and novelist
- Perri Klass, pediatrician and writer
- Stewart Kohl, financier
- Philip Maneval, composer
- David Mansfield, musician
