= School Without Walls (Canberra) =

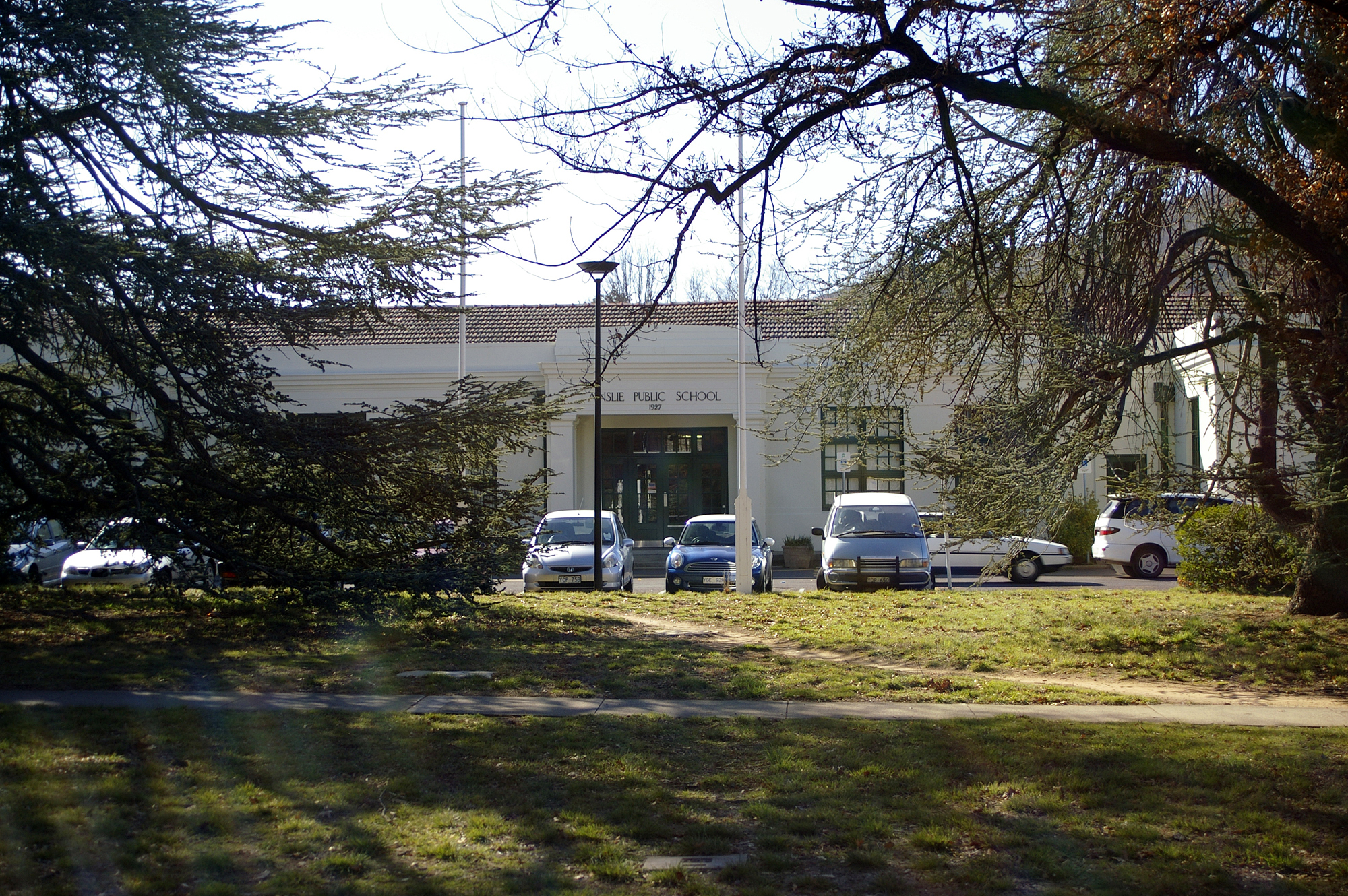
- The building which housed the School Without Walls from 1980 to 1997, now the Ainslie Arts Centre

Location
- Braddon, Canberra; Australia
- Coordinates: 35°16′27.9″S 149°8′14.2″E

Information
- Type: Public alternative school
- Opened: 1974
- Closed: 1997

The School Without Walls (SWOW) was a public alternative school in Canberra, the capital of Australia, which operated from 1974 to 1997.

== History ==
In 1973, a group of students, teachers and parents voluntarily met to establish the school to cater for educational needs they considered were not being met by the mainstream public education system in the Australian Capital Territory.

The school's original location was on Childers Street within the campus of the Australian National University, where the meetings to establish the school were held. Later in 1974, the school relocated to what is now St Patrick's Church in Braddon, which had previously housed the Catholic schools St Patrick's School and St Mary's School–Our Lady of Mercy. In 1980, the school moved to what was formerly the infants building at Ainslie School in Braddon (now the Ainslie Arts Centre), where it was co-located with the Questacon science centre.

In 1995, the ACT Education Department conducted a review which recommended the School Without Walls be restructured, and in 1996 a pilot program was established, with a full parallel programme established at Dickson College in 1997.

== Notable people ==
People who attended SWOW includes Tim Ferguson.

Ned Manning spent a short time there as a teacher.
