= Kingsland School =

Pupil referral unit in Oldham, Greater Manchester, England

Coordinates: 53.5542°N 2.0869°W

Information
- School type: Pupil Referral Unit
- Age: 10 to 16

Kingsland School is a pupil referral unit located on Broadbent Road, Watersheddings, Oldham.

Kingsland School supports pupils, aged between 10 and 16, who are unable to access mainstream school, including those with behaviour problems, or have been permanently excluded, or those who cannot attend for medical reasons.
