= Hollinwood, Greater Manchester =

Electoral ward and suburb in Oldham, Greater Manchester

Coordinates: 53.5183°N 2.1440°W

Hollinwood
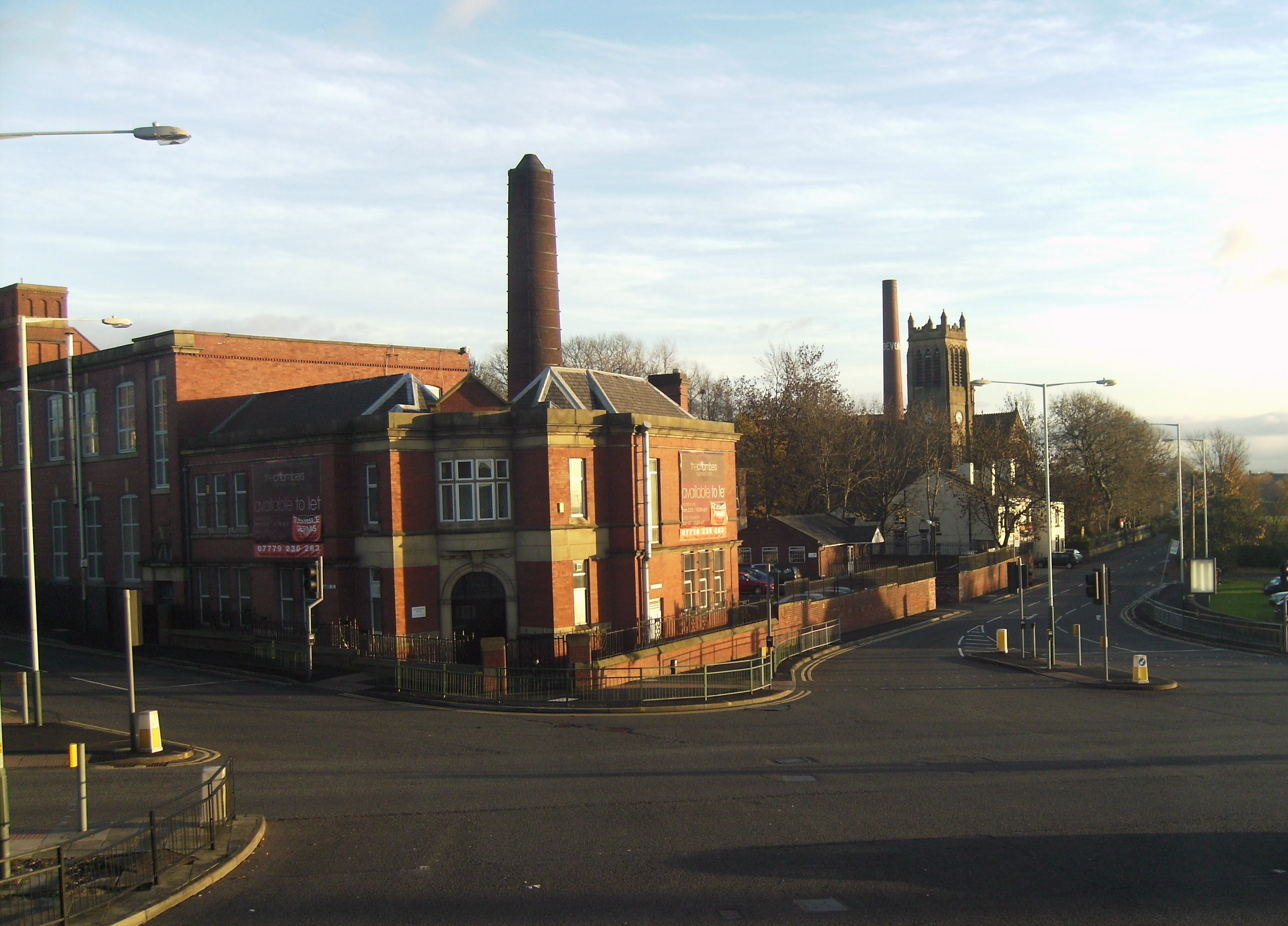
- A view towards St Margaret's church, from the A62 road

- Location within Greater Manchester
- Population: 10,920 (2011 Census)
  - Density: 40.5
- OS grid reference: SD904024
  - London: 163 mi (262 km) SSE
- Metropolitan borough: Oldham
- Metropolitan county: Greater Manchester
- Region: North West
- Country: England
- Sovereign state: United Kingdom
- Post town: OLDHAM
- Postcode district: OL8
- Dialling code: 0161
- Police: Greater Manchester
- Fire: Greater Manchester
- Ambulance: North West
- UK Parliament: Oldham West and Royton

Hollinwood is an area and electoral ward of the Metropolitan Borough of Oldham, Greater Manchester, England. The population at the 2011 census was 10,920.

Bisected by the A62 road, Hollinwood is southwest of Oldham, contiguous with the towns of Chadderton and Failsworth, at Junction 22 of the M60 motorway.

== History ==
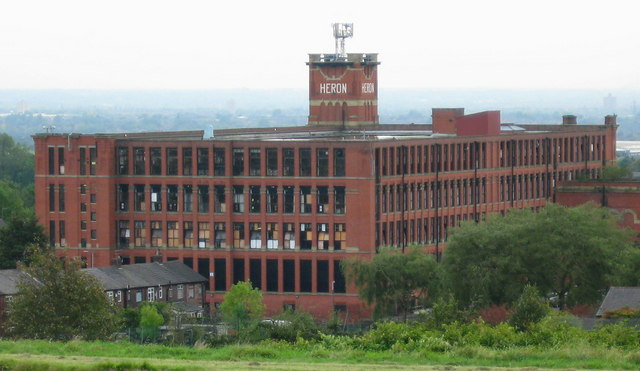
Heron Mill, Hollinwood

Historically part of Lancashire, Hollinwood in pre-industrial times was a moor or common on the borders of Chadderton and Oldham. The rights to the land were disputed by the townships with Chadderton claiming 8 acres, but a 1713 court settlement stipulated that Hollinwood Moor should be within Oldham. The mid to late 18th century saw Hollinwood develop into a village. Mid 19th century gazetteers described Hollinwood as 'an extensive village in the townships of Chadderton and Oldham'. In 1880 there were further exchanges of land in the Hollinwood area between Oldham Borough and Chadderton township.

James Butterworth (1826) described it as being of 66.5 Cheshire acres (approx. 140 statute acres). It was enclosed by the Oldham Enclosure Acts (42 and 43 George III; May 1802). Hollinwood's mills such as the Heron, Fox, Asia, Wharf, Richmond and Park were later built on what had been the Hollinwood Common. The Chapel Road playing fields is one of the few open spaces remaining in the district. The pitches occupy the site of a former reservoir serving a now-defunct stretch of the Hollinwood Branch Canal.

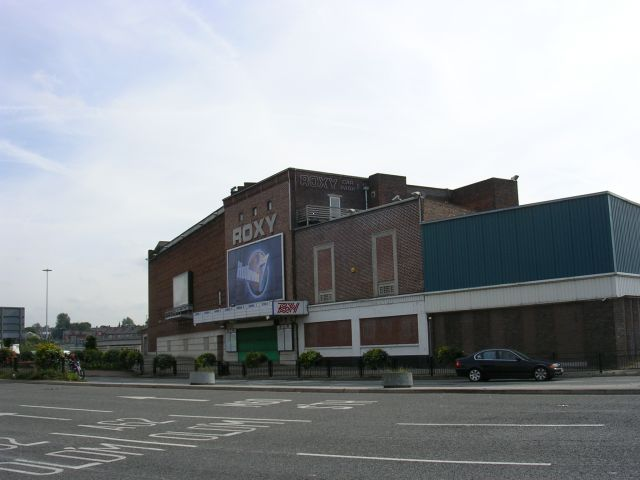
The Roxy Cinema was demolished in 2007.

Long existing as an industrial district, Hollinwood is today home to the Northern Counties Housing Association, and Mirror Colour Print Ltd; the printing division of the Trinity Mirror group, which prints and distributes thirty-six major newspapers, and employs five hundred staff.

From the late 19th century, the area was largely occupied by workers in Oldham's cotton mills and miners at the large collieries at Oak and Bower, and several smaller ones. Much of Hollinwood's more recent growth was due to the Ferranti factory which produced power transformers in its heyday. Later the factory produced container lifting trucks as the building had the height to do so. The transformer works building, built after the war on the old Bower site, is now used as a newspaper printing plant. A neighbouring, much older, Ferranti factory produced electricity meters. The meter factory was sold to Siemens in the 1980s and became known as FML; Siemens later closed the FML factory.

Hollinwood was struck by an F1/T2 tornado on 23 November 1981, as part of the record-breaking nationwide tornado outbreak on that day. The tornado later moved over Oldham town centre, causing further damage.

Until its closure in 2005 Hollinwood was home to the popular Roxy Cinema. The Roxy opened on 20 December 1937 screening the film 'Fire Over England'. Seating was provided in stalls and circle levels for 1,406 and there was a cinema cafe. Saturday matinées for children were extremely popular. In 1978 the cinema was split into two screens, then in 1981 it became a three screen cinema. Further sub-division occurred to create six screens which seated:470, 130, 260, 260 320 and 96. In 1998 a seventh screen was added. In 2002 the Roxy received a £100,000 upgrade. After closure the Roxy was subsequently demolished in February 2007.

Several other cinemas existed in the Hollinwood area during the early to mid 20th century period including the La Scala and The Queens.

There was a very busy Hollinwood market, on Hollins road near to the junction with Oldham Road, one day a week for many years.

== Governance ==
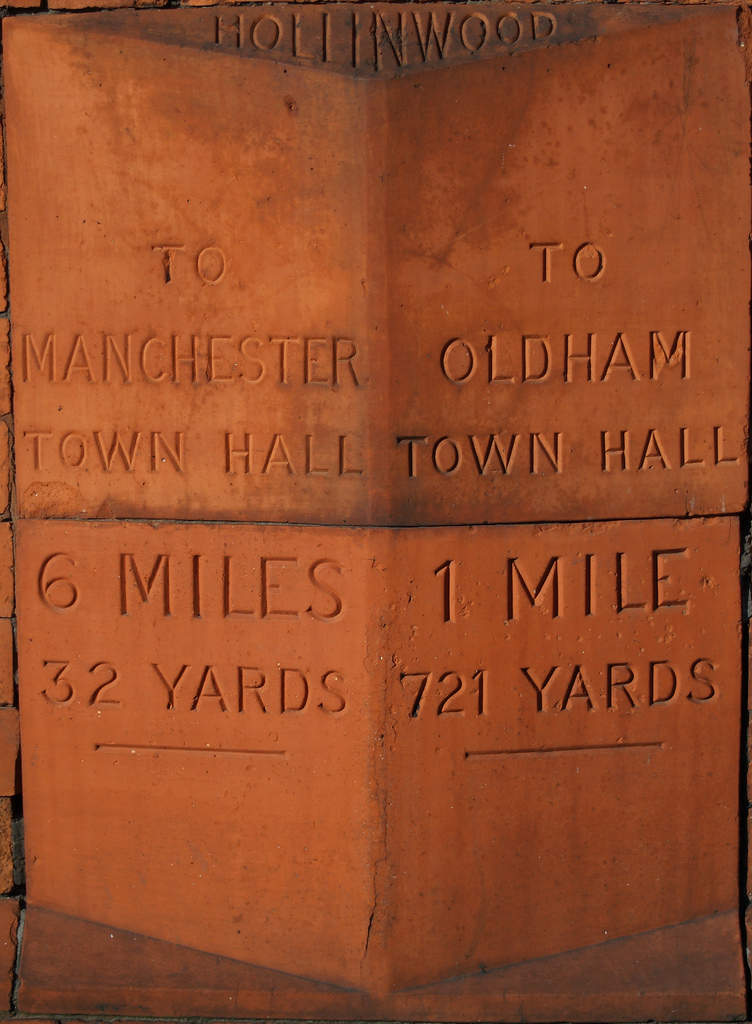
This milestone, part of the Smut Inn public house, indicates the distance between Oldham and Manchester Town Hall.

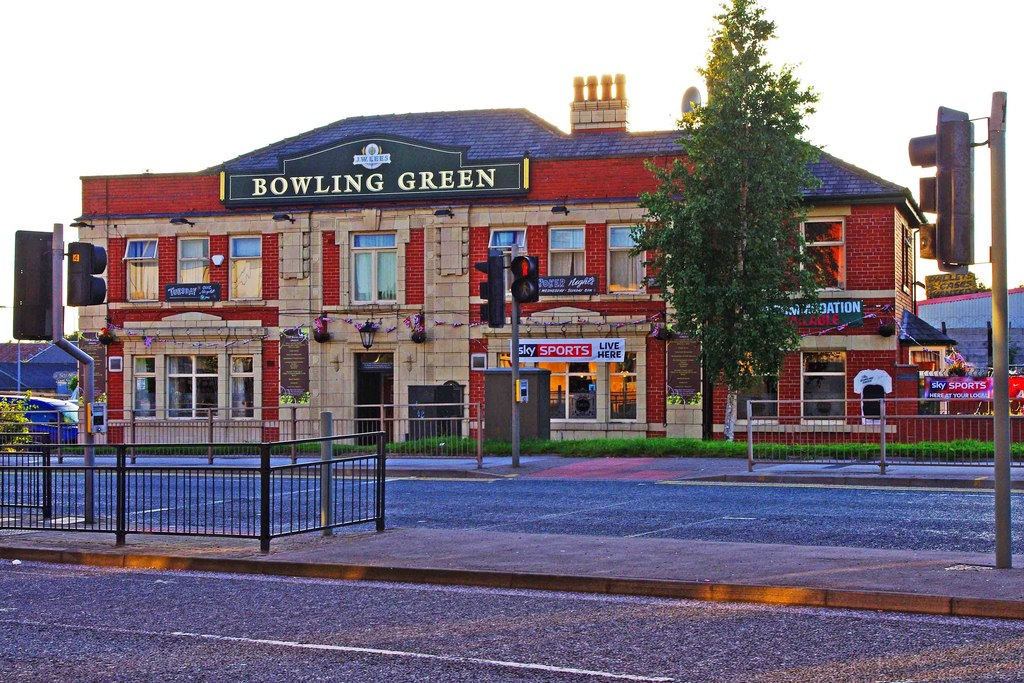
The Bowling Green Inn, Hollinwood

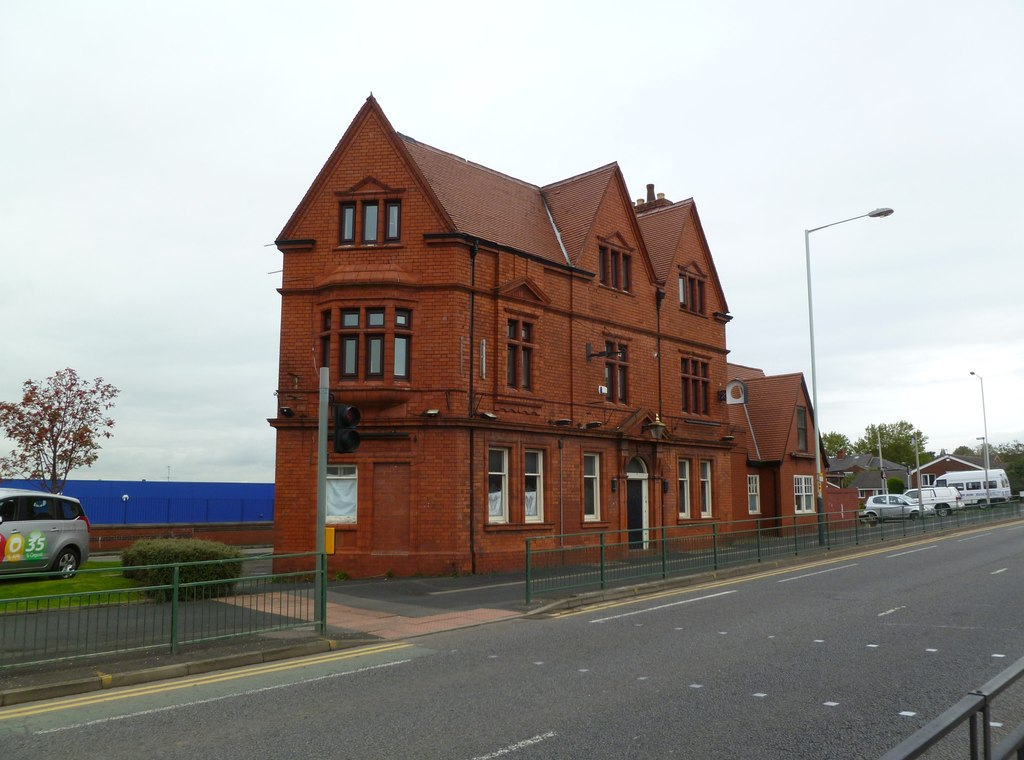
The now closed Smut Inn, Top of Hollinwood

Hollinwood was once a chapelry of the ecclesiastical parish of Prestwich-cum-Oldham, in the Hundred of Salford. The Parish Church, St. Margret of Antioch is still under the patronage of the Rector of Prestwich, though this position is currently suspended.

Until local government re-organisation in 1974, part of Hollinwood lay within the Chadderton Urban District in the administrative county of Lancashire. This area is now divided between the Hollinwood and South Chadderton ward districts.

As part of the town of Oldham, Hollinwood forms part of the wider Metropolitan Borough of Oldham. Politically, after the 2023 local elections the Hollinwood ward is represented by three Conservative Party councillors, who flipped all three seats of the previously Labour Party held ward.

The boundaries of the Hollinwood ward were changed in 2003 following a Boundary Commission review. The part of Hollinwood lying west of the M60 motorway now lies in Failsworth East ward while part of Oldham St Paul's ward was transferred to Hollinwood. The ward currently comprises the rest of Hollinwood and the adjoining localities of Hollins, Garden Suburb and Limeside (also known as Limehurst Village).

Hollinwood is part of the parliamentary constituency of Oldham West and Royton.

== Geography ==
Hollinwood is included in the 5% most economically deprived wards in the United Kingdom.

The Hollinwood Branch Canal used to pass through the district. The last vestiges of the canal in Hollinwood were destroyed by the works for the M60 motorway. Those parts of the branch canal which still exist are not in Hollinwood.

Hollinwood was changed substantially by the M60 motorway (completed in 2000) which passes to the south of Manchester.

== Religion ==
=== St Margaret of Antioch (Church of England) ===
Prior to 1760, the villagers of Hollinwood would have to travel to Oldham St Mary's for services. The emergence of a village at Hollinwood during the mid 18th century necessitated the building of a church there. The new church dedicated to St. Margaret of Antioch (Church of England) was completed by 1768 and was consecrated by the Bishop of Chester on 8 July 1769. The builder was Edmund Whitehead, and an account of his work was recorded on his gravestone in the churchyard. It is said that the cost of building was only £500 and that a grant towards this was received from Queen Anne's Bounty. The church was smaller than the present building and when built had no tower, the current church building dating from 1877. A tower was added in 1904. The church is a grade II listed building.

Recent years has seen further restoration. Grants from English Heritage, the Heritage Lottery Fund, National Churches Trust and others have allowed the church to complete two major restoration projects to date: phase one – restoration of the tower, and phase two – the replacement and restoration of the roofs of the north aisle, nave, transept, chancel and sacristy. Further funding for urgent roof restoration work was secured in 2017, saving the church from closure.

=== Other churches in Hollinwood ===
The late 19th century saw a number of churches established in Hollinwood, many of which have now closed including:-

The Memorial Church - It was founded before 1895 and closed in 1988. The Hollinwood Congregational Church (earlier in its history known as The Memorial Church or Chapel) was situated on the corner where Pump Street intersected with Manchester Road. The church building faced onto Manchester Road with the Sunday School building behind it taking the length of Pump Street. In view of plans for the motorway and declining numbers the church building was sold and the church united with Beulah Baptist Church where the members continue to meet and worship. The building, which had become a warehouse, has since been demolished. It was well known because of the prominence of its clock tower.

St James (Free Church of England). It was founded in 1870. The original church closed in 1972 for widening the A62 Road when they moved to Byron Street/Grammar School Road. The church closed in 2008.

Beulah (Baptist), Withins Road, founded in 1891 and still in existence.

Bethesda (Baptist), Milton Street, founded in 1895, closed at a date unknown.

Hollins Road (Baptist), circa late 19th century, date of closure unknown.

Alford Street (Welsh Congregational), it was founded before 1892. It closed in 1978.

Hudson Street (Methodist), it was founded in 1877. It closed in 1976.

Bourne Street (Methodist), it was founded in 1832 and closed in 1922.

Byron Street/Hive Street (Spiritualist), circa late 19th century, date of closure unknown

Holy Family (Roman Catholic), Roman Road, founded in 1958–present. Prior to 1958 Holy Family parish was a constituent part of the extensive parish of Corpus Christi which included all of Hollinwood, Hollins, Limeside, parts of Werneth and much of central and south Chadderton.

Bible Mission Church, Old Lane, founded in 1896.

Salvation Army, Manchester Road. Founded: 1925 Closed: 1995

Hollins Road (Methodist), it was founded in 1894. It closed in 1960.

St John (Manchester Road, Methodist), it was founded in 1839. It closed in 1958.

Hollins (Methodist), Millgate, founded in 1840. Still open in 2015.

== Transport ==
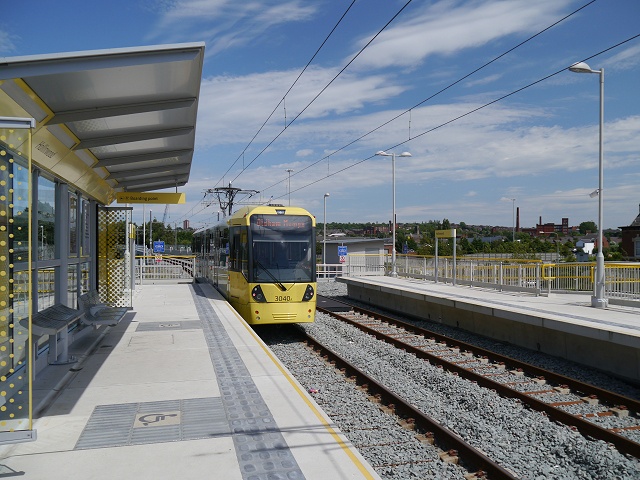
Hollinwood tram stop

Hollinwood is linked to Manchester and Oldham via the A62 road. The M60 motorway links the area to Stockport, Manchester Airport and the Trafford Centre.

The area is served by Hollinwood tram stop on the Manchester Metrolink line between East Didsbury and Rochdale. Services generally run every 12 minutes in each direction during the day. The area was previously served by Hollinwood railway station, which was part of the Oldham Loop Line. However, the line closed in October 2009 and the converted line reopened in June 2012.

There are frequent buses running through Hollinwood between Manchester city centre and Oldham on Bee Network's 83 overground service. There is also a frequent services running towards Manchester city centre with services 84 and 184 and to Huddersfield/Saddleworth via Oldham. These were once Limited Stop (Express) services but lost this status in 2004. Other destinations which can be reached from Hollinwood on the bus are Ashton-under-Lyne and Chadderton.

== Notable people ==
British Olympic freestyle swimming champion, Henry Taylor was born in Hollinwood.

Prolific twentieth-century hangman Albert Pierrepoint owned a public house on Manchester Road named "Help the Poor Struggler". This pub however was demolished when work began on the M60 motorway.

Hannah Beswick (died 1785), from Birchin Bower in Hollinwood, had a pathological fear of premature burial. Her fear was such that her will specified her body be kept aboveground, and that once a year, in the presence of two witnesses, the veil was to be lifted from her face, to look for signs of life. This eccentric will made Beswick a celebrity, and her mummified body was donated to the Manchester Museum and put on public display in the entrance hall, with the soubriquet Manchester Mummy.
