= Coppice, Greater Manchester =

Locality in Oldham, Greater Manchester, England

Coordinates: 53.529°N 2.119°W

Coppice
- Location within Greater Manchester
- Population: 2,835,686
- OS grid reference: SD924037
- Metropolitan borough: Oldham
- Metropolitan county: Greater Manchester
- Region: North West
- Country: England
- Sovereign state: United Kingdom
- Post town: OLDHAM
- Postcode district: OL8
- Dialling code: 0161
- Police: Greater Manchester
- Fire: Greater Manchester
- Ambulance: North West
- UK Parliament: Oldham West and Royton

Coppice is a locality and urban/suburban area the town of Oldham, in Greater Manchester, England.

It is located to the south of Oldham town centre and is contiguous with other areas of Oldham including Hathershaw, Werneth, Hollins, Copster Hill and Primrose Bank.

Coppice is the location of Hulme Grammar School and Werneth Cricket Club whose ground is known as 'The Coppice'.

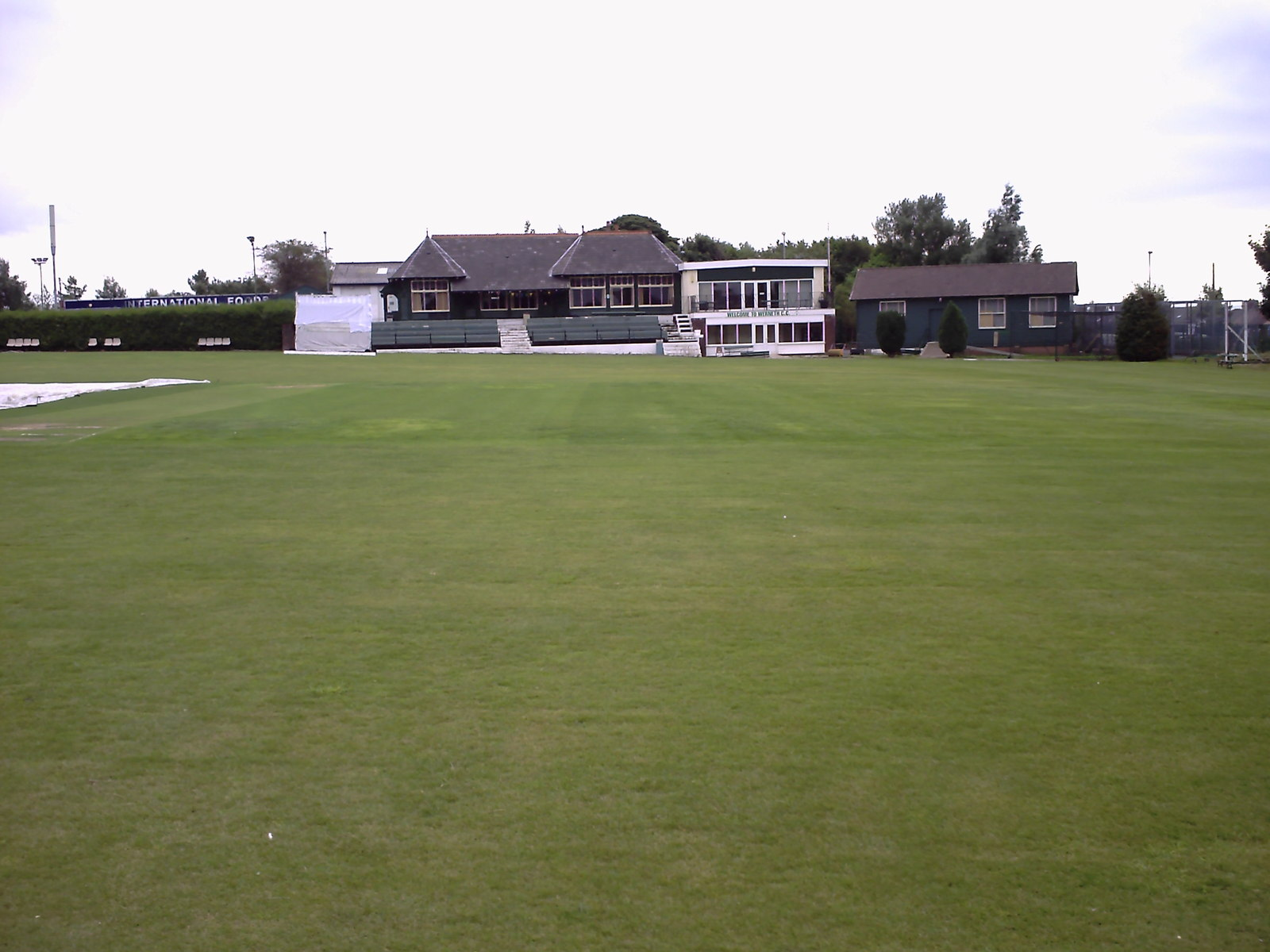
The Coppice, Werneth Cricket Club
