= Hathershaw =

Coordinates: 53.5283°N 2.1123°W

- Location within Greater Manchester
- OS grid reference: SD925035
- Metropolitan borough: Oldham
- Metropolitan county: Greater Manchester
- Region: North West
- Country: England
- Sovereign state: United Kingdom
- Post town: OLDHAM
- Postcode district: OL8
- Dialling code: 0161
- Police: Greater Manchester
- Fire: Greater Manchester
- Ambulance: North West

Hathershaw (or, archaically, Hathershaw Moor) is an urban area of Oldham, in Greater Manchester, England. It occupies a hillside to the immediate south of Oldham town centre, and is bordered by the districts of Coppice to the north-west and Fitton Hill to the south-east. Hathershaw, which has no formal boundary or extent, is bisected from north to south by the A627 road which leads to Ashton-under-Lyne.

Historically a part of Lancashire, Hathershaw is one of the oldest recorded named places in Oldham, the name occurring in a deed for 1280 with the spelling Halselinechaw Clugh. Existing as a manor house in the 15th century, Hathershaw Hall was the home of a Royalist family in the 17th century who lost part of their possessions as a result of the English Civil War.

Hathershaw, an area identified by the Housing Market Renewal Initiative as having terraced residences unsuited to modern needs, is currently undergoing gentrification.

The Hathershaw College (formerly the Hathershaw College of Technology and Sport) is a secondary school in Hathershaw. It is a co-educational non-denominational school and was given Technology and Sports College status under the Specialist School Programme.
