= E-ACT Royton and Crompton Academy =

Coordinates: 53°34′04″N 2°06′14″W

Location
- Blackshaw Lane; Oldham, Greater Manchester, OL2 6NT; England

Information
- Type: Academy
- Motto: Honesty, Excellence, Aspiration
- Local authority: Metropolitan Borough of Oldham
- Department for Education URN: 146316 Tables
- Ofsted: Reports
- Headteacher: Gemma Cottingham
- Gender: Co-educational
- Age: 11 to 16
- Enrolment: 1115
- Website: E-Act Royton and Crompton Academy

E-ACT Royton and Crompton Academy is a coeducational, secondary academy school for 11- to 16-year-olds in the Metropolitan Borough of Oldham, Greater Manchester, England. As of 2026, they were rated good with outstanding features by Ofsted.

== History ==
The school was formerly called Royton and Crompton School. In this incarnation it was judged Inadequate by Ofsted in 2017. The school became an academy as part of E-ACT in 2018. As of 2019, the headteacher is Andrea Atkinson. The previous headteacher before Andrea Atkinson was Neil Hutchinson who was the head teacher from September 2016 to December 2018
