= Huddersfield bus station =

Bus station in West Yorkshire, England

Coordinates: 53.645°N 1.786°W

Huddersfield
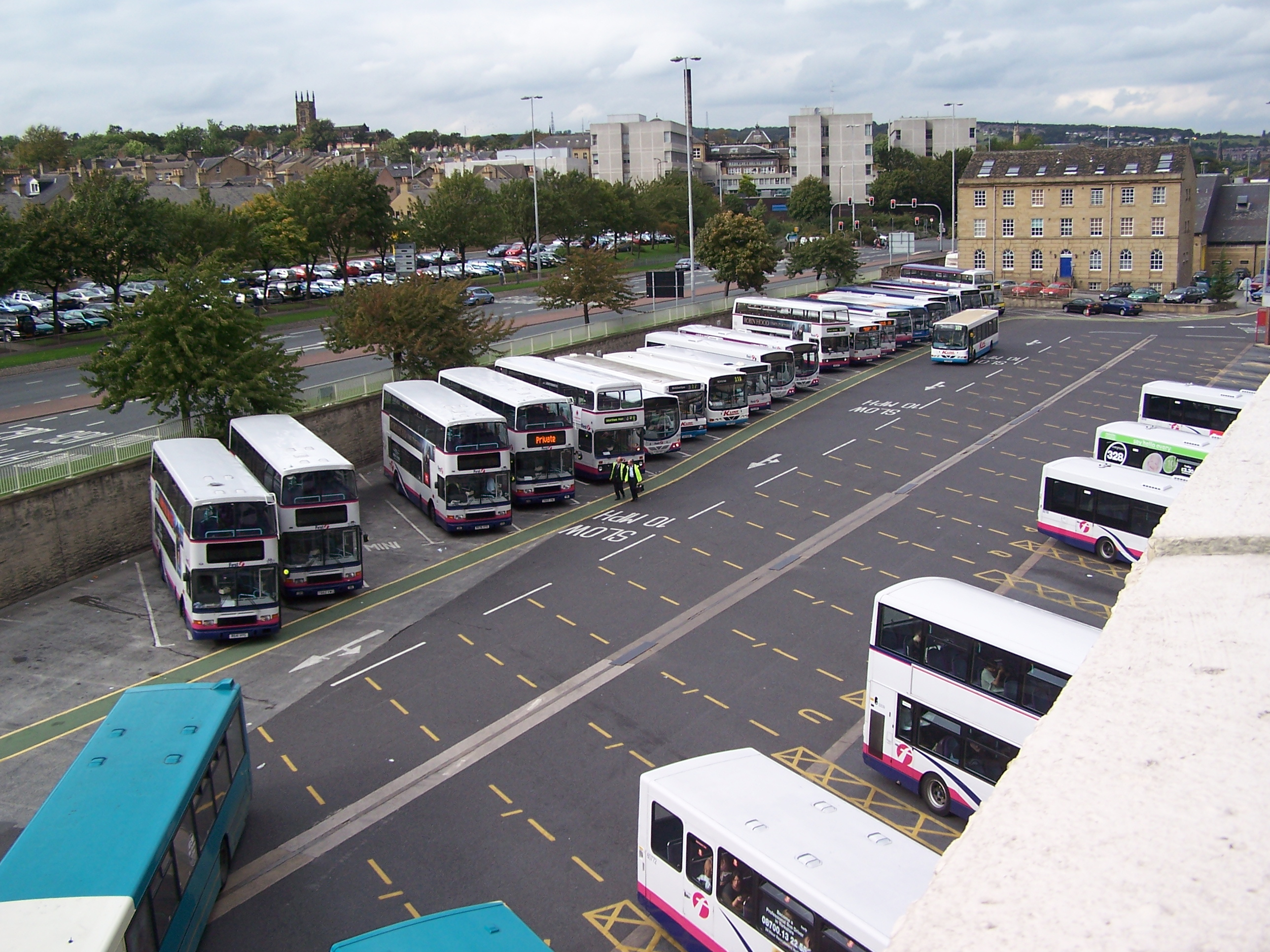
- Huddersfield bus Station as viewed from the car park above

General information
- Location: Upperhead Row, Huddersfield; Kirklees
- Operator: Metro
- Bus stands: 28
- Bus operators: First West Yorkshire, Arriva Yorkshire, Team Pennine, Stotts Coaches, Stagecoach Manchester, TLC Travel, South Pennine CT
- Connections: Huddersfield railway station (330 yards [300 m])

History
- Opened: 1974
Location

Huddersfield bus station serves the town of Huddersfield, West Yorkshire, England.

The bus station was opened on Sunday 1 December 1974 and is owned and managed by Metro. It is the busiest bus station in West Yorkshire and is used by more than 33,000 passengers every day. The bus station is situated in Huddersfield town centre, underneath the Multi-storey car park. It is bordered by the Ring Road (Castlegate A62) and can be accessed from High Street, Upperhead Row and Henry Street.

There are 25 pick-up and three alighting only stands at the bus station.

== Services ==
The main operators at the bus station include First West Yorkshire, Arriva Yorkshire and Team Pennine with other services run by Stagecoach Manchester, TLC, South Pennine Community Transport and Stotts Coaches. National Express coaches run nationwide from here. In March 2009, Megabus started to run a coach service, called Megabusplus to London, which involves changing from the coach on to an East Midlands Railway service at East Midlands Parkway.

There are plenty of local services which link Huddersfield with the surrounding areas of the town such as Denby Dale, Golcar, Holmfirth, Lindley, Marsden, Meltham, Milnsbridge, Slaithwaite. In addition to this, there are several services which run to other towns in West Yorkshire such as Batley, Bradford, Brighouse, Cleckheaton, Dewsbury, Elland, Halifax, Hebden Bridge, Heckmondwike, Leeds, Mirfield, Morley and Wakefield, the White Rose Shopping Centre plus the 184 service which links Huddersfield with Oldham.
