= Rochdale (ancient parish) =

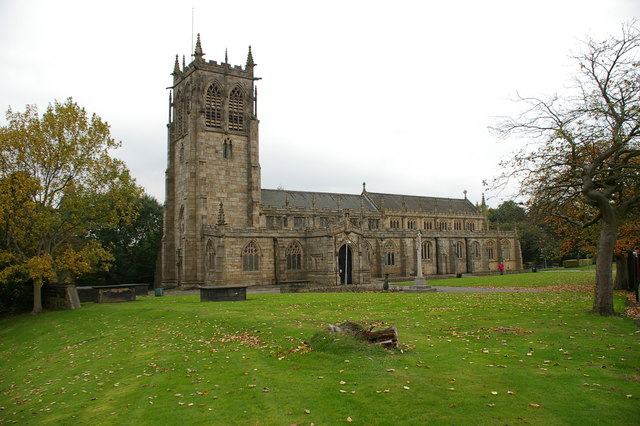
- Church of St Chad, Rochdale

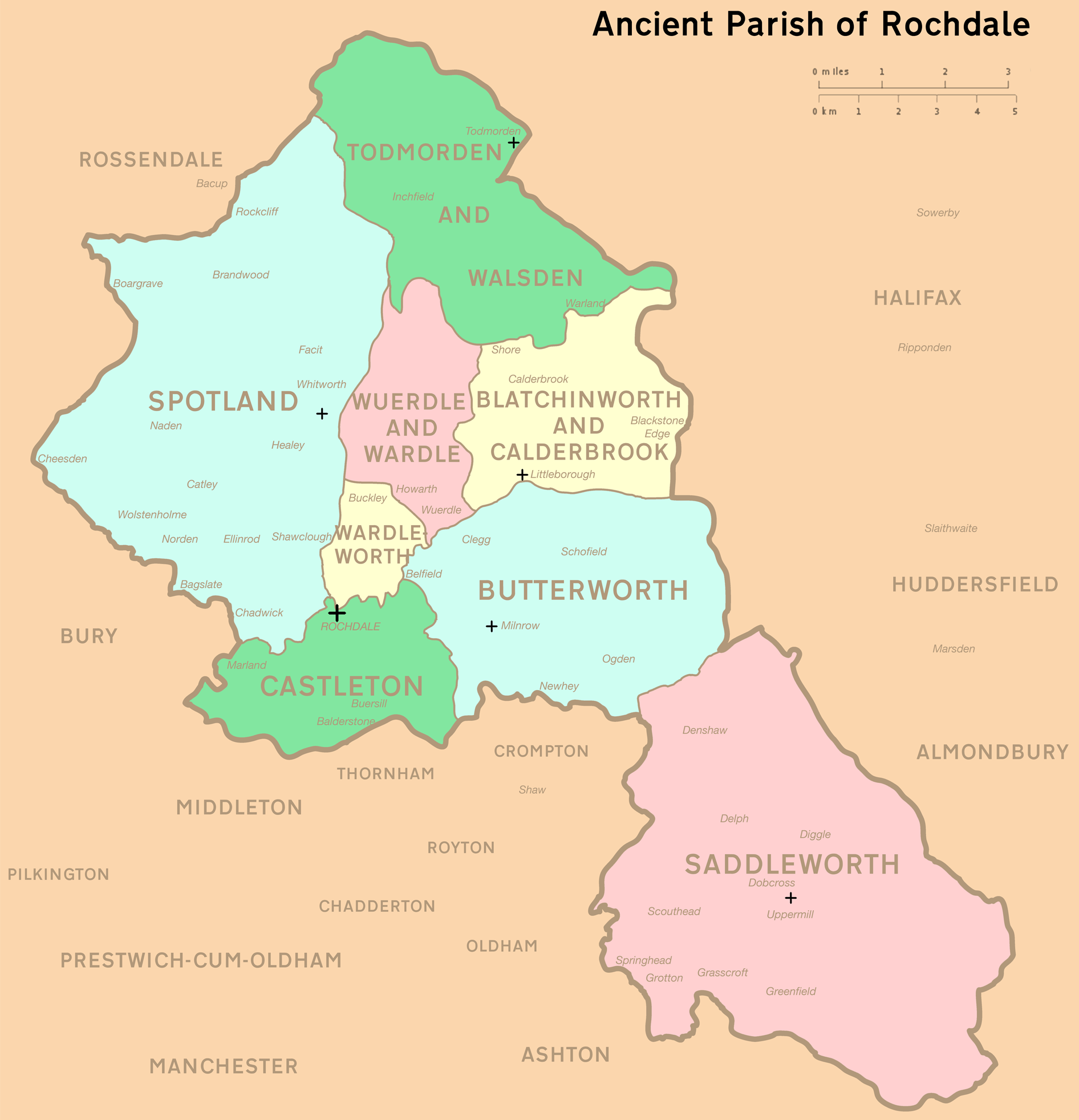
- Area
  - 1831: 58,620 acres (237.2 km^{2})
  - 1861: 40,340 acres (163.3 km^{2})
  - Coordinates: 53.6147°N 2.1577°W
- Population
  - 1801: 26,577
  - 1861: 91,754
- History
  - Created: Early Middle Ages
- Status: Ecclesiastical parish
  - HQ: Rochdale
- Subdivisions
  - Type: Townships
  - Units: 1. Todmorden and Walsden; 2. Spotland 3. Wuerdle and Wardle 4. Blatchinworth and Calderbrook 5. Wardleworth 6. Castleton 7. Butterworth; 8. Saddleworth
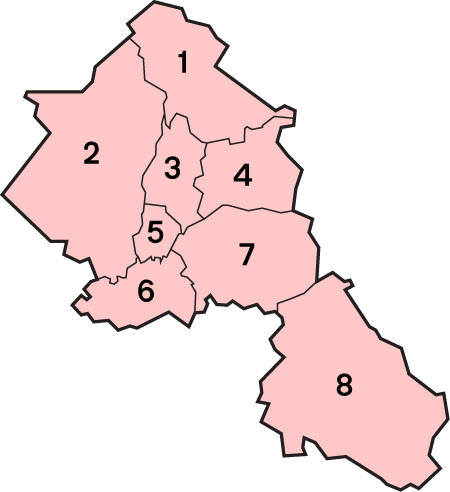

Rochdale was an ecclesiastical parish of early-medieval origin in northern England, administered from the Church of St Chad, Rochdale. At its zenith, it occupied 58,620 acres (237 km^{2}) of land amongst the South Pennines, and straddled the historic county boundary between Lancashire and the West Riding of Yorkshire. To the north and north-west was the parish of Whalley; to the southwest was the parish of Bury; to the south was Middleton and Prestwich-cum-Oldham.

Anciently a dependency of Whalley Abbey, the parish of Rochdale is believed to be of Anglo-Saxon origin, as evidenced by historical documentation, toponymy and its dedication to Chad of Mercia.

Urbanisation, population shifts, and local government reforms all contributed towards the gradual alteration and ultimate dissolution of the historic parish boundaries; the social welfare functions of the parish were broadly superseded by the English Poor Laws and new units of local governance, such as the County Borough of Rochdale and the Milnrow Urban District. Today, the territory of the former parish lies within Lancashire, Greater Manchester and West Yorkshire.

== History ==
Rochdale was recorded in the Domesday Book as Recedham; and in 1242 as Rachedale.

== Divisions ==
From a very early stage in its history, Rochdale consisted of five divisions or townships: in the Lancashire part of the parish was Butterworth, Castleton (in which stood the parish church), Hundersfield and Spotland; Saddleworth, for ecclesiastical purposes, was a part of Rochdale, but lay entirely in Yorkshire and otherwise had only a "very slight" connection to the parish. Hundersfield was later parted into four townships; Blatchinworth and Calderbrook; Todmorden and Walsden; Wardleworth; and Wuerdle and Wardle, bring the total number of divisions to eight.

Township or division	Coverage	Brief history	Ref.
Blatchinworth and Calderbrook	Blackstone Edge, Blatchinworth, Calderbrook, Littleborough, Shore	Originally part of the manor of Hundersfield.	
Butterworth	Belfield, Bleakedgate-cum-Roughbank, Clegg, Firgrove, Haughs, Hollinworth, Ladyhouse, Lowhouse, Milnrow, Newhey, Ogden, Tunshill, Wildhouse		
Castleton	Balderstone, Buersill, Castleton Glebe, Lower Lane, Marland, Newbold	The oldest division of the parish, and named for Rochdale Castle. Reputed to be the site of conflict between Saxons and Danes. The parish church sat within Castleton township. Territory was lost to the Municipal Borough of Rochdale in 1856; Castleton Urban District occupied the remainder until 1900 when it too was absorbed into Rochdale by mutual agreement.	
Saddleworth	Austerlands, Castleshaw, Delph, Denshaw, Diggle, Dobcross, Friezland, Grasscroft, Greenfield, Grotton, Heights, Lydgate, Scouthead, Springhead, Uppermill	A chapelry of Rochdale for ecclesiastical purposes, but for judicial and taxation purposes was a township coterminate with Saddleworth-cum-Quick in the Agbrigg-division of Agbrigg and Morley in the West Riding of Yorkshire. The connection with Rochdale was made on account of Hugo de Stapleton, Lord of the Manor of Saddleworth, having applied to Hugh, Earl of Chester, to erect a chapel for the use of his tenants. The Earl allowed it on the condition the chapel be annexed to Whalley Abbey, which, on the Dissolution of the Monasteries, this was annexed to Rochdale. Seceded from Rochdale and became an independent parish in 1866.	
Spotland	Bagslate, Brandwood, Catley, Chadwick, Cheesden, Ellinrod, Facit, Falinge, Healey, Naden, Norden, Shawforth, Whitworth, Wolstenhulme	The oldest families of Rochdale are from Spotland like the Healeys, Catleys and the Chadwicks	
Todmorden and Walsden	Inchfield, Todmorden, Walsden, Warland	Originally part of the manor of Hundersfield.	
Wardleworth	Cronkeyshaw, Buckley, Fieldhouse, Foxholes	Originally part of the manor of Hundersfield.	
Wuerdle and Wardle	Wardle, Wuerdle	Originally part of the manor of Hundersfield. Also known as Wuerdale and Wardle and Wuerdle-cum-Wardle.	

== See also ==
- Manchester (ancient parish)
