= Whit Friday =

First Friday after Pentecost

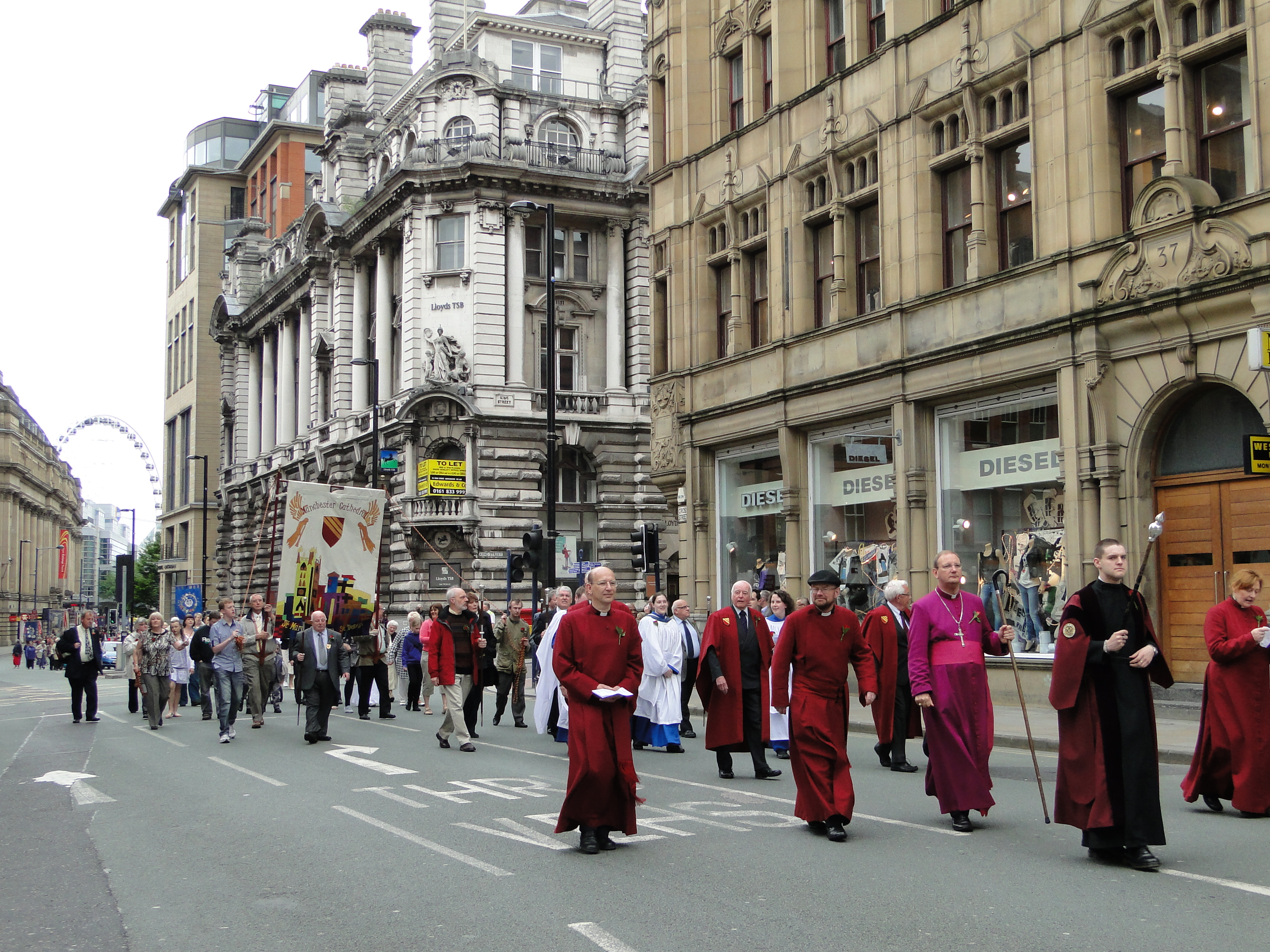
- The 2010 Whit walks in Manchester on Cross Street showing the banner and clergy from Manchester Cathedral.
- Observed by: North West England
- Type: Christian, Public
- Observances: Processions, Parades, Brass Band Contests
- Begins: 1st Friday After Whit Sunday
- Date: Ordinary Time
- 2025 date: 13 June
- 2026 date: 29 May
- 2027 date: 21 May
- 2028 date: 9 June
- Frequency: annual
- Related to: Whit Sunday, Whit Monday, Whit Tuesday, Trinity Sunday

Whit Friday, meaning "white Friday", is the name given to the first Friday after Pentecost or Whitsun (White Sunday).

The day has a cultural significance in North West England, as the date on which the annual Whit Walks are traditionally held. By convention, the Whit Walks coincide with brass band contests, held in Saddleworth, Oldham, Tameside and other outlying areas of Greater Manchester. Traditionally, children and their supporters from Anglican Sunday Schools 'walked' on Whit Monday, those from RC Sunday Schools on Whit Friday, and there was an element of competition in general display, dresses and banners. Outside Manchester city centre, other Sunday Schools walked on Whit Sunday and in surrounding towns on other days during (or in the weeks following) Whit Week. This period marked the height of their year's activities for many local brass bands.

== History ==
The Feast of Pentecost, which falls on the seventh Sunday after Easter, is an important feast day in the Christian Church. In the United Kingdom this was followed by a week of festivities called "Whitsuntide". As the population moved away from the countryside during the Industrial Revolution, the celebrations became less important in many areas, but in the manufacturing towns of North West England they were seen as a welcome break from work in the mills and factories. In an article in the Manchester Times in 1859 the London correspondent wrote:

Whitsuntide is not a great holiday week with us, as with you...indeed, we have now no amusements appropriate to this season. We used to have fairs but these degenerated into nuisances and were properly enough suppressed in the interests of public morality and decency...although a good number of well-to-do Londoners take advantage of the week for a cheap trip, the mass of the populace work and toil through the week, which you Lancashire people have so well and wisely reserved for recreation. - The Manchester Times

Manchester traditionally held its annual horse races on Kersal Moor between the Wednesday and Saturday of Whit Week. The local Sunday School Superintendents worried about the gambling and drinking and "desiring to keep youth of both sexes from the demoralising recreations of the racecourse, took them to fields in the neighbourhood and held anniversary celebrations, tea parties etc. in the schools."

During the nineteenth century Whitsuntide became an accepted holiday week for all, with the mills shutting down and the workers taking canal boat trips and later, with the coming of the railways, cheap rail excursions.

=== Whit walks ===
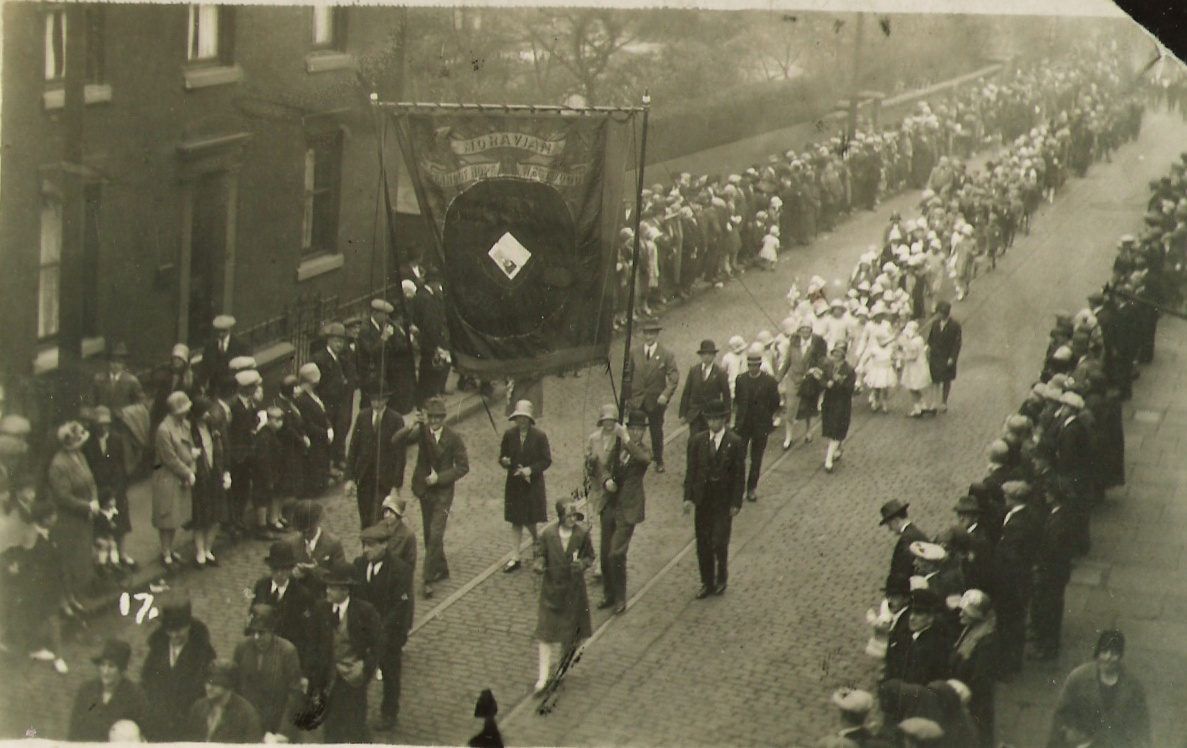
Members of Westwood Moravian Church, Oldham, Lancashire, taking part in a Whit Sunday parade some time in the 1920s

The origin of the whit week processions of "Sunday school scholars" (which are still held to this day) dates back to 19 July 1821 when there was a procession of the children of Manchester to commemorate the coronation of George IV. On that day children of all denominations walked in procession from their schools and assembled at Ardwick Green to sing "God Save the King". From then on the annual festival flourished and, in the course of time, St Ann's Square became the assembly ground. The numbers continued to grow and this was moved to Albert Square in 1878. Each Whit Friday, local churches or chapels in the region employed bands to lead traditional processions through the streets. Whit Friday was the "Scholars' Walk", or the Church's Annual Day when the girls would have a new dress and the boys would have new trousers, and neighbours, friends and relatives would give a penny for their new clothes. The church officers, clergy and children carried baskets of flowers or ribbons attached to banners.

== Brass band contests ==
A brass band contest has been held in Stalybridge on Whit Friday since at least 1870. However, on Whit Friday 6 June 1884, two further events in Uppermill and Mossley were held, inadvertently launching an internationally renowned and unique brass band occasion - the Annual Whit Friday Band Contests. The Whit Friday contests are now firmly placed in the brass band calendar and attract thousands of people, whether musicians or spectators, to listen to brass band music. The bands' discipline, stamina and organisational skills are tested to the limit. Each of the contests on the Whit Friday circuit is organised by a dedicated committee who organise their own contest prizes.

=== Contests ===
The contests are split between Saddleworth and Tameside. The following localities have held brass band contests on Whit Friday:

Saddleworth:

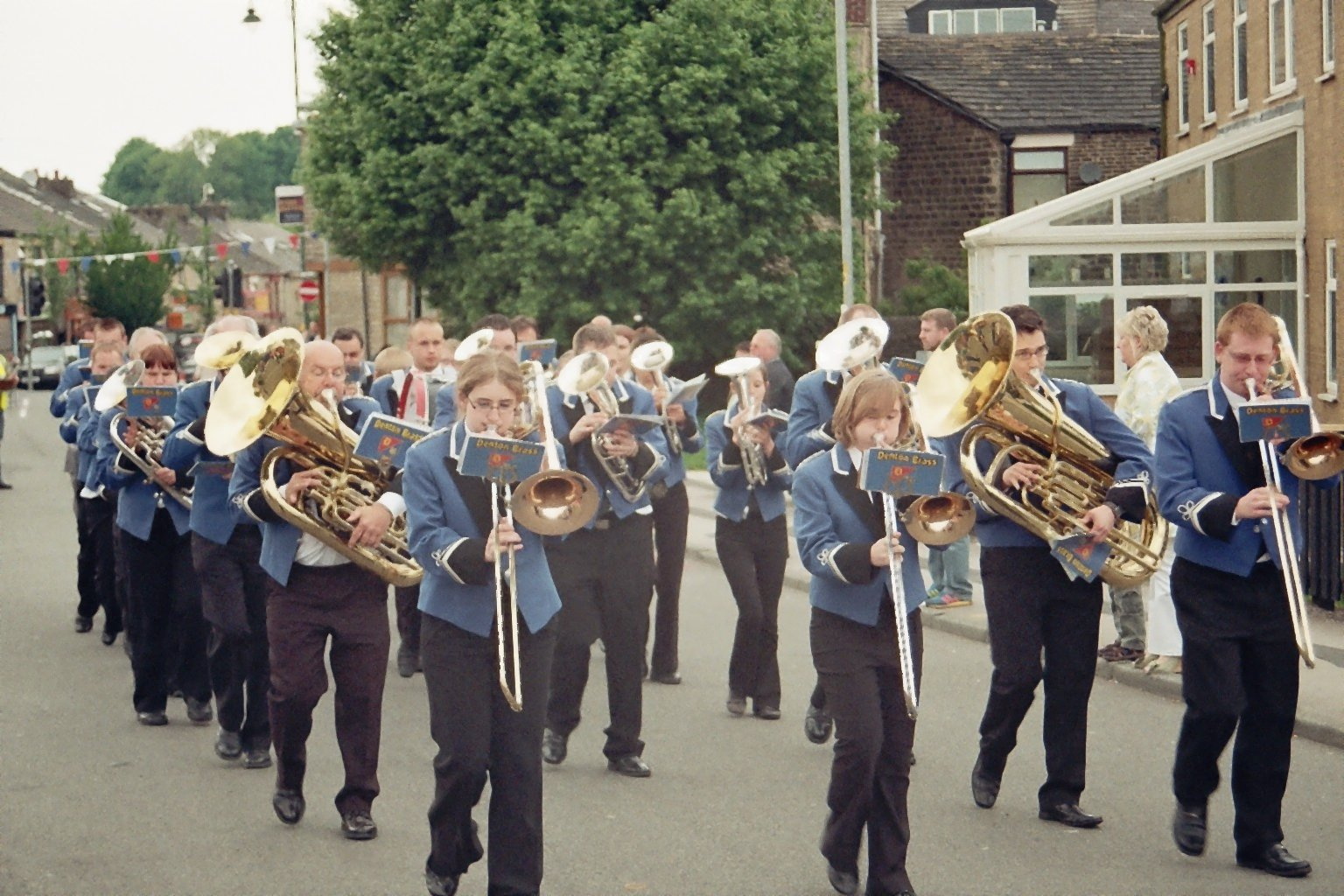
The Denton Brass Band, Top Mossley, 2008

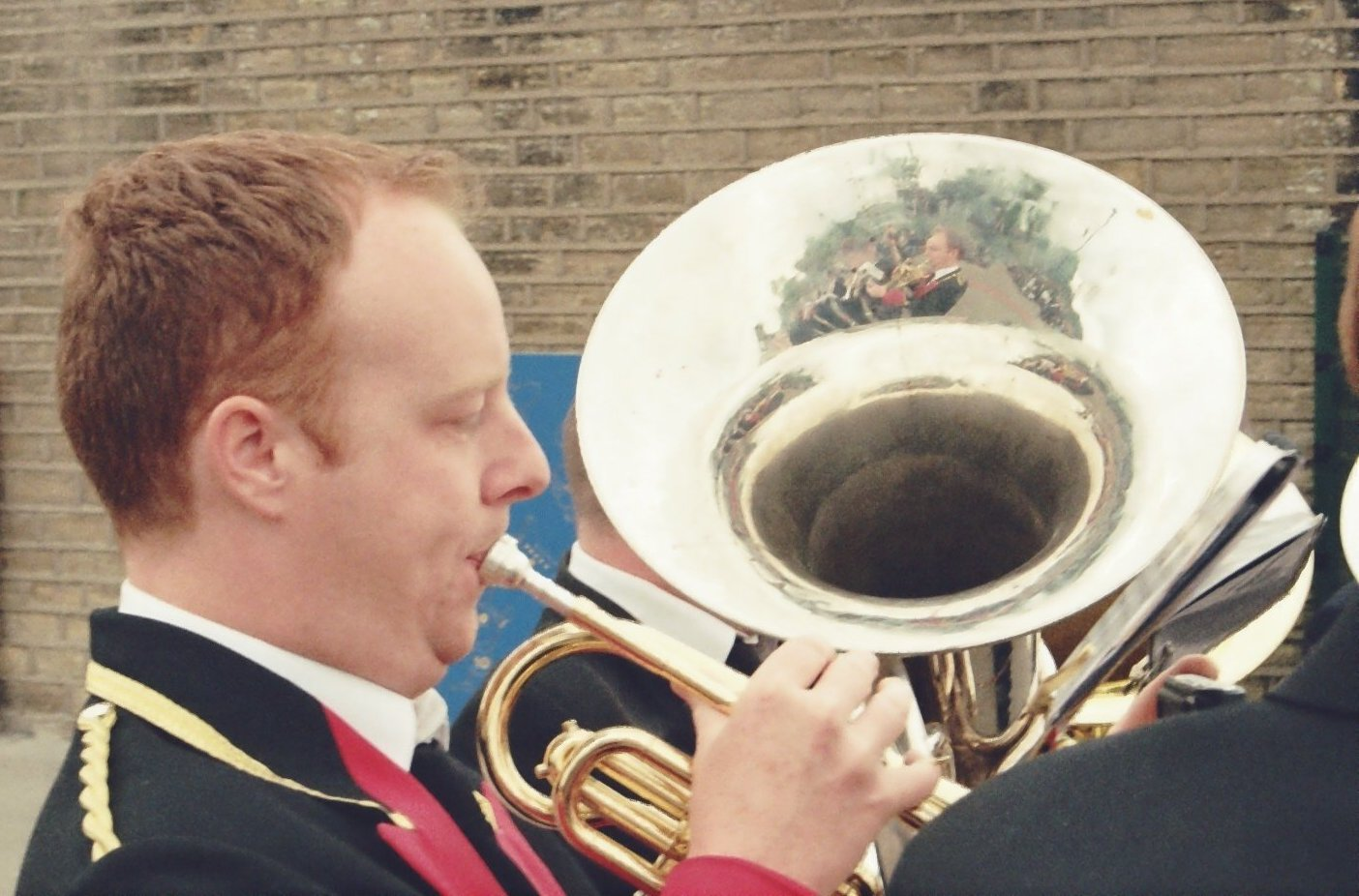
A participant in a Whit Brass Band contest, Top Mossley, 2008

- Dobcross
- Delph
- Denshaw
- Uppermill
- Friezland
- Grotton
- Lees
- Lydgate
- Scouthead & Austerlands
- Greenfield
- Diggle

Tameside:

- Stalybridge
- Millbrook, Stalybridge
- Carrbrook, Stalybridge
- Heyrod, Stalybridge
- Stalybridge Celtic, Stalybridge
- Top Mossley
- Micklehurst, Mossley
- Dukinfield
- Hurst Village, Ashton-under-Lyne
- Broadoak, Ashton-under-Lyne
- Denton
- Droylsden

== See also ==
- Wakes week
