= Friezland =

Village in Greater Manchester, England

Coordinates: 53.535°N 2.023°W

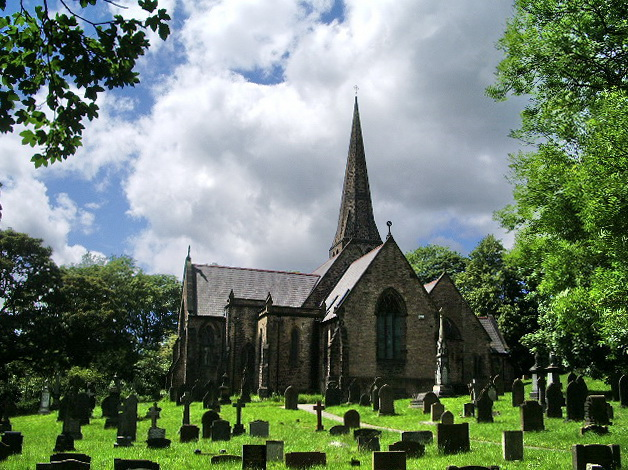
- Christ Church, Friezland

- Location within Greater Manchester
- OS grid reference: SD984042
- Civil parish: Saddleworth
- Metropolitan borough: Oldham
- Metropolitan county: Greater Manchester
- Region: North West
- Country: England
- Sovereign state: United Kingdom
- Post town: OLDHAM
- Postcode district: OL3
- Dialling code: 01457
- Police: Greater Manchester
- Fire: Greater Manchester
- Ambulance: North West
- UK Parliament: Oldham East and Saddleworth

Friezland is a village in the civil parish of Saddleworth in the Metropolitan Borough of Oldham, in Greater Manchester, England. It is situated four miles east of the town of Oldham.

Historically a part of the West Riding of Yorkshire, Friezland lies between the village of Grasscroft and nearby town of Mossley. Friezland is situated on the banks of the Huddersfield Narrow Canal, and has a church, a church hall and a primary school. It is also the original home of Friezland Brass Band . The band has now set up a base in neighbouring village Uppermill, Saddleworth.

Friezland railway station was opened in 1886 by the LNWR on its loop line from Diggle to Stalybridge. The station itself was situated in what is, in the present day, outside of Friezland's boundaries and closer to the centre of nearby Greenfield. It closed to passengers in 1917.

== See also ==
- Listed buildings in Saddleworth
