= Springhead, Greater Manchester =

Coordinates: 53.537°N 2.058°W

Springhead
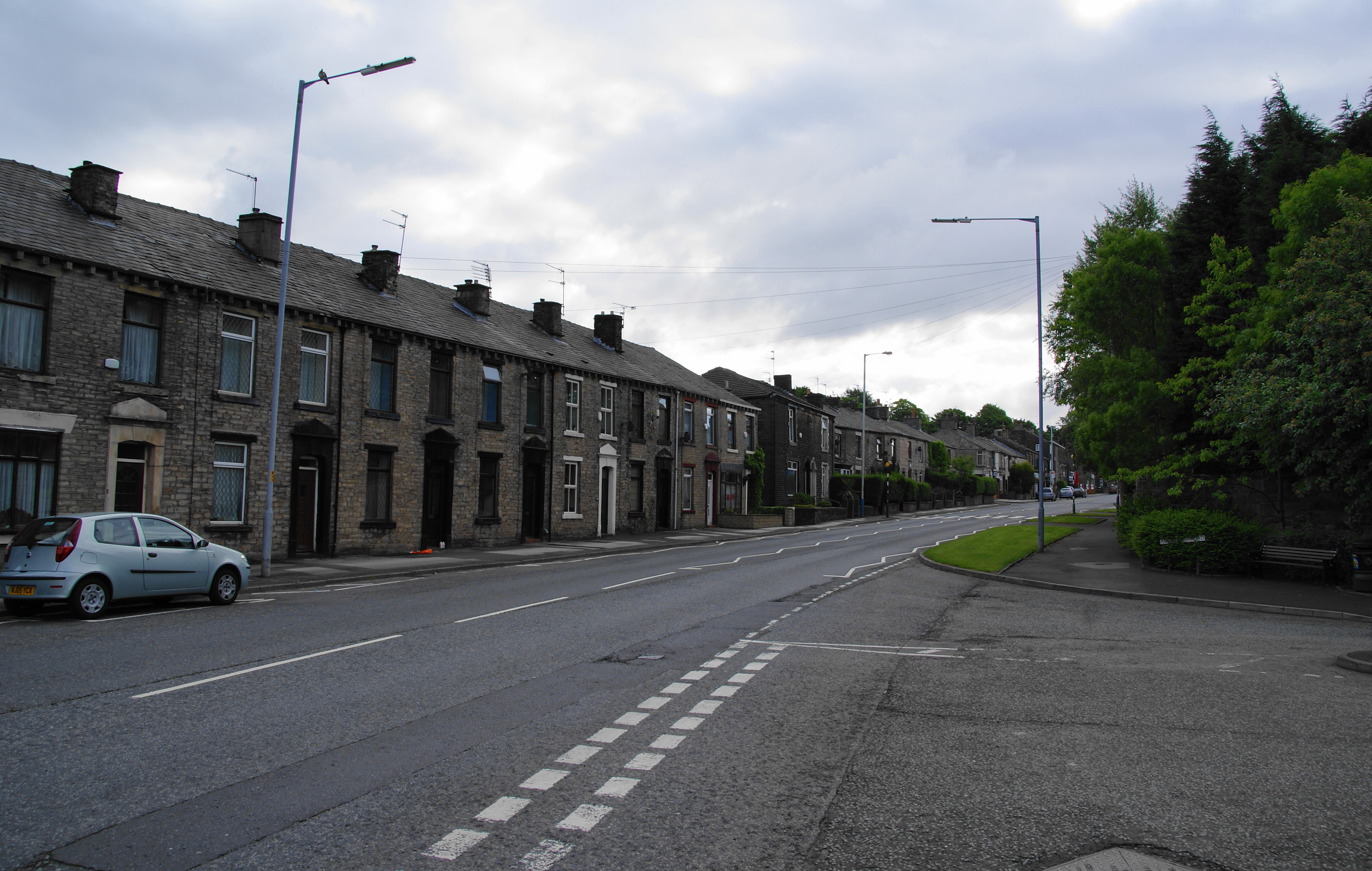
- Oldham Road, Springhead

- Location within Greater Manchester
- OS grid reference: SD961045
- Civil parish: Saddleworth
- Metropolitan borough: Oldham
- Metropolitan county: Greater Manchester
- Region: North West
- Country: England
- Sovereign state: United Kingdom
- Post town: OLDHAM
- Postcode district: OL4
- Dialling code: 0161
- Police: Greater Manchester
- Fire: Greater Manchester
- Ambulance: North West
- UK Parliament: Oldham East and Saddleworth

Springhead is a suburban area in the civil parish of Saddleworth in the Metropolitan Borough of Oldham, in Greater Manchester, England.

== Description ==
Situated near the eastern edge of the Greater Manchester Urban Area, Springhead is contiguous with the village of Lees, and with the Austerlands, Scouthead and Grotton areas of Saddleworth. It was named after Springhead House, an historical dwelling which had a freshwater spring in its grounds.

It is historically part of the West Riding of Yorkshire. The main hub is the Post Office. There is also a community centre. Springhead Infant and Nursery School and Knowsley Junior School serve the area. The football club (Springhead A.F.C.) play in the Manchester Football League, and the cricket club, Springhead CCC, in the Greater Manchester Cricket League.

In March 2022, a petition was submitted to the parish council to construct 158 homes on the former Springhead Quarry, now a protected site for conservation.

During the COVID-19 pandemic, Springhead and the neighbouring village of Grasscroft had some of the highest infection rates in Greater Manchester.

== History ==
In 1894 Springhead became a civil parish, being from the part of Saddleworth in Quickmere Middle Division Urban District, in 1895 it became part of Saddleworth Urban District, on 1 April 1937 the parish was abolished and merged with Saddleworth. In 1931 the parish had a population of 4834.

== Transport ==
Springhead's bus services are operated by Stagecoach Manchester and Diamond North West.

The Grotton and Springhead railway station - nicknamed the 'Delph Donkey' due to the previous route of the passenger service ending at Delph - once served the village. Passenger service was withdrawn in 1955, and the line closed in 1963. The track has been lifted since and replaced with a bridle path which follows alongside a large length of the original railway.

== Culture ==
In the Higher Springhead area, there is a longstanding tradition of the mayor leading the town's brass band contest on Whit Friday, wearing a ceremonial clog iron suspended on a lavatory chain and adorned with barrel-shaped dog tags engraved with the names of previous mayors. The tradition dates back to the late 1940s in the village of Austerlands.

== Notable people ==
- Judith Barker (born 1943) — television actress
- Herman Hilton (1894–1947) — rugby league footballer
- Annie Kenney (1879–1953) — English working-class suffragette
- Thomas Steele (1891–1978) — recipient of the Victoria Cross

== See also ==
- Listed buildings in Saddleworth
