= A62 road =

Road in England

A62

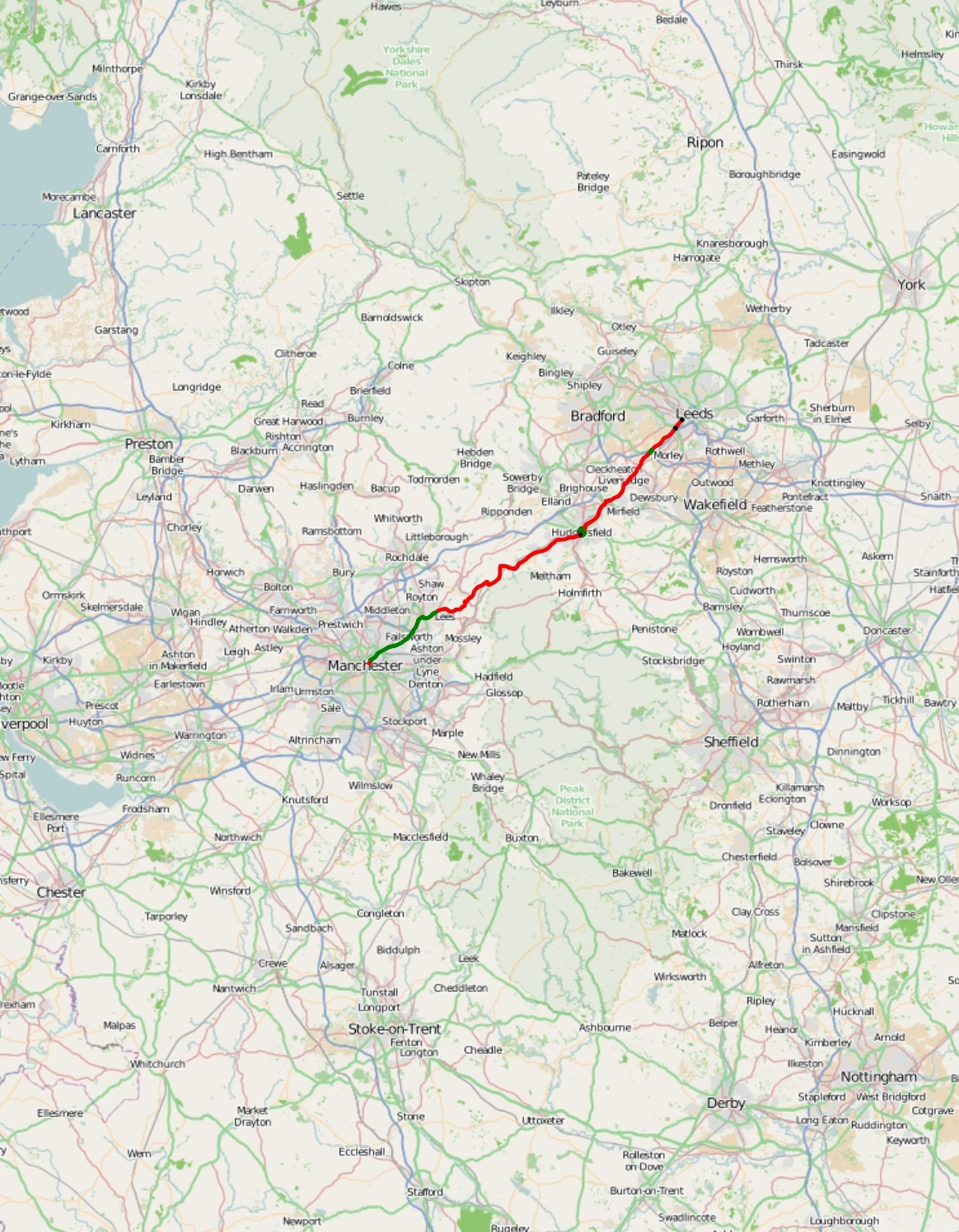
- Click map to enlarge

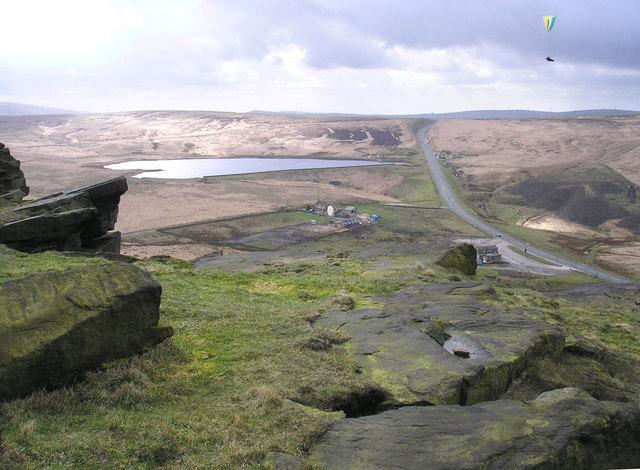
- Standedge seen from the top of nearby Pule Hill. Standedge cutting and Redbrook Reservoir can be seen

Route information
- Length: 38.6 mi (62.1 km)

Major junctions
- West end: A665 in Manchester; 53.4849°N 2.2327°W

- M60 near Oldham M62 / M621 / A650 near Birstall
- East end: A58 in Leeds; 53.7878°N 1.5709°W

Location
- Country: United Kingdom
- Counties: Greater Manchester; West Yorkshire
- Primary destinations: Oldham; Huddersfield; Liversedge

Road network
- Roads in the United Kingdom; Motorways; A and B road zones
← A61	→ A63

The A62 road in Northern England runs between the cities of Leeds in West Yorkshire and Manchester in Greater Manchester covering a distance of 38.5 miles (62.0 km). It passes through Heckmondwike, Huddersfield, Oldham and Failsworth. The highest part of the motorway is in the Pennines.

== Route ==
The A62 begins at a junction with the A58 road as Gelderd Road in Leeds. It runs through West Yorkshire, passing through Birstall, Heckmondwike, Liversedge, Huddersfield, Linthwaite, Slaithwaite, and Marsden. It crosses the Pennines at Standedge, and continues through Saddleworth and into Oldham. From there, the A62 runs into Manchester as Oldham Street and Oldham Road through Failsworth, ending at the Manchester Inner Ring Road.

== History ==
It is paralleled at some distance by part of the M62 Trans-Pennine motorway. Before the M62 was built, the A62 was the main trans-Pennine road between Oldham and Huddersfield. The M62 is numbered after the A62 and now takes most of the long-distance traffic between Manchester and Leeds (2023 Average daily traffic figures: M62: 110,000 A62: 5,885.)

== Junction list ==
County	Location	mi	km	Destinations	Notes
Greater Manchester	Manchester	0.0	0.0	Manchester Inner Ring Road (A665) / M62 / A6 / A56 / A57 / A635 – Liverpool, Salford, Bury, Sheffield, Ashton-under-Lyne	Western terminus
Greater Manchester	Manchester	1.2	1.9	Queens Road / Hulme Hall Lane (A6010) – Cheetham Hill, Harpurhey, Collyhurst, Clayton, Beswick	Destinations signed westbound only
Greater Manchester	Failsworth	3.0	4.8	A663 north (Broadway) to M62 / A627(M) / M60 – Leeds, Rochdale, Chadderton	To M62, M60 and Leeds signed eastbound only; southern terminus of A663
Greater Manchester	Failsworth– Oldham– Chadderton boundary	4.4– 4.6	7.1– 7.4	M60 south / M67 / M56 – Ashton-under-Lyne, Sheffield A6104 to M60 north / A663 – Chadderton, Oldham South	M60 junction 22
Greater Manchester	Oldham	5.8	9.3	A6048 north (Featherstall Road South) to A671 – Royton	No access from A62 west to A6048; southern terminus of A6048
Greater Manchester	Oldham	6.2	10.0	A669 (A627 north) / Manchester Street to A627(M) – Town centre, Rochdale, Chadderton	To A669 and Chadderton signed eastbound only; western terminus of A627 / A669 concurrency
Greater Manchester	Oldham	6.3– 6.7	10.1– 10.8	A627 south – Town centre, Ashton-under-Lyne	Junction; no eastbound entrance; eastern terminus of A627 concurrency
Greater Manchester	Oldham	7.2	11.6	A669 east / A635 – Lees, Holmfirth, Stalybridge	Westbound access via B6194; Stalybridge signed westbound only
Greater Manchester	Oldham	7.8	12.6	A672 northeast (Ripponden Road) to M62 – Halifax, Denshaw, Saddleworth	Saddleworth signed westbound only; southwestern terminus of A672
Greater Manchester	Delph	11.5	18.5	A6052 (The Sound / Delph New Road) to A670 – Denshaw, Delph, Dobcross, Uppermill	Brief concurrency
Greater Manchester	Diggle	13.3	21.4	A670 south (Standedge Road) – Uppermill, Diggle, Saddleworth	Saddleworth signed westbound only; northern terminus of A670
West Yorkshire	Huddersfield	24.3	39.1	A629 south to M1 south / A616 / A6024 – Holmfirth, Wakefield, Sheffield, Meltham	A629, To M1, Wakefield and Sheffield signed northbound only, To A6024 and Meltham southbound only; southern terminus of A629 concurrency
West Yorkshire	Huddersfield	24.5	39.4	A640 west (Trinity Street) to M62 west – Rochdale	Eastern terminus of A640
West Yorkshire	Huddersfield	24.6– 24.8	39.6– 39.9	A629 north to M62 east – Halifax	Junction; eastern terminus of A629 concurrency
West Yorkshire	Huddersfield	25.1	40.4	A641 north – Brighouse, Bradford	Southern terminus of A641
West Yorkshire	Huddersfield	25.2	40.6	A62 to M1 south / A642 / A629 – Oldham, Wakefield, Sheffield, Kingsgate	To M1, A642, A629, Oldham, Wakefield and Sheffield signed westbound only, Kingsgate eastbound only
West Yorkshire	Bradley	28.1	45.2	A6107 west (Bradley Road) to M62 / A640 / B6118 – Rochdale, Elland	To M62, B6118 and Elland signed westbound only; eastern terminus of A6107
West Yorkshire	Calderdale– Mirfield boundary	28.5	45.9	A644 northwest (Wakefield Road) to M62 – Brighouse	Western terminus of A644 concurrency
West Yorkshire	Mirfield	28.8	46.3	A644 southeast (Huddersfield Road) – Mirfield, Ravensthorpe	Ravensthorpe signed eastbound only; eastern terminus of A644 concurrency
West Yorkshire	Liversedge	31.2	50.2	A649 (Halifax Road / Wakefield Road) to A638 – Halifax, Batley, Dewsbury, Heckmondwike	To A638, Batley, Dewsbury and H'wike signed eastbound only
West Yorkshire	Liversedge	31.3	50.4	A638 (Bradford Road / Frost Hill) – Dewsbury, Bradford, Cleckheaton, Heckmondwike	A638, Dewsbury, Bradford and H'wike signed westbound only
West Yorkshire	Heckmondwike	31.8	51.2	A651 north (Gomersal Road) / B6117 (New North Road) to A650 – Bradford, Dewsbury, Heckmondwike, Gomersal	Southern terminus of A651
West Yorkshire	Birstall	33.0	53.1	A652 (Bradford Road) to A651 – Bradford, Batley, Dewsbury	
West Yorkshire	Birstall	33.2	53.4	A643 (Nelson Street / Leeds Road) – Birstall, Morley	
West Yorkshire	Birstall– Gildersome boundary	34.5– 34.9	55.5– 56.2	M62 to M1 – Halifax, Manchester, Hull, Pontefract M621 east – Leeds A650 (Wakefield Road) – Bradford, Wakefield, Morley	M62 junction 27
West Yorkshire	Leeds	37.7	60.7	A6110 (Leeds Outer Ring Road) / M621 / M62 / M1 / A647 / A653 – Bradford, Dewsbury, Huddersfield	Huddersfield signed westbound only
West Yorkshire	Leeds	38.6	62.1	A58 (Whitehall Road) to M621 / M62 / M1 / A58(M) / A61 / A64 – City centre, Halifax, Wortley, Wetherby, Harrogate, York	Eastern terminus
1.000 mi = 1.609 km; 1.000 km = 0.621 mi
