= Grotton =

Coordinates: 53.534°N 2.051°W

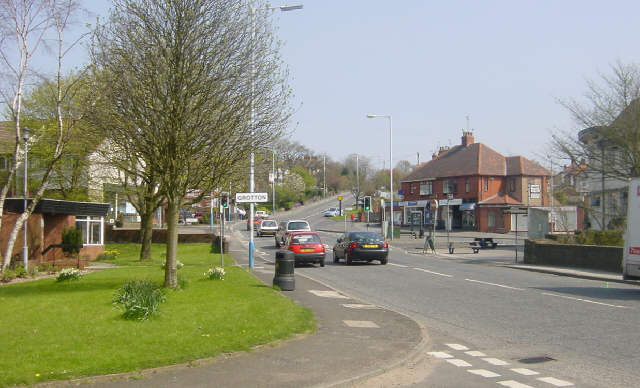
- A view of Grotton along the A669 road

- Location within Greater Manchester
- OS grid reference: SD965042
- Civil parish: Saddleworth
- Metropolitan borough: Oldham
- Metropolitan county: Greater Manchester
- Region: North West
- Country: England
- Sovereign state: United Kingdom
- Post town: OLDHAM
- Postcode district: OL4
- Dialling code: 0161
- Police: Greater Manchester
- Fire: Greater Manchester
- Ambulance: North West
- UK Parliament: Oldham East and Saddleworth

Grotton is a residential area in Saddleworth, a civil parish of the Metropolitan Borough of Oldham, in Greater Manchester, England. Located along the A669 road, it forms a continuous urban area with Austerlands and Springhead, which in turn link to Lees and Oldham, all of which are to Grotton's west.

Historically a part of the West Riding of Yorkshire, Grotton was anciently a rural hamlet close to the boundary with Lancashire, and was centred on Grotton Hall, a former manor house. The hall was purchased by Edmund Buckley in the 1840s and inherited by his son Sir Edmund Buckley in 1864. Buckley sold the hall after he was declared bankrupt in 1876.

Although some buildings date from the 17th and 18th century, the urbanisation of Grotton broadly took place following the Industrial Revolution; Grotton became a large suburb of Oldham following a residential building boom in the 1930s. The 1930s housing being brick built are in stark contrast to the millstone grit farm houses dotted around the hamlet.

Before the inter-war residential development, Grotton was home to light industry, including brickworks and a couple of textile mills. All of these are now closed and demolished. During the 1930s new leisure buildings were constructed. Some still prominently featured, such as the Grade II listed Grotton pub built in 1938 have now been converted to a Co-op along with a lido and tennis courts added in 1935 to serve the leisure needs of the burgeoning community. However, these were closed in 1939. The former railway line to Oldham Mumps railway station closed in 1962, has been converted into a linear country park, providing a largely traffic-free walk for most of the way into Oldham. The old Grotton and Springhead railway station is also preserved. The platforms are visible, and the buildings are now a private house. East of Grotton, the line ran to join the current trans-pennine railway line at Greenfield railway station, but while it is possible to walk east from the station to the western portal of Lydgate Tunnel, the tunnel itself is blocked off and impassable, although it is maintained by the former British Railways Property Board in order to prevent subsidence.

== Transport ==
Bus services running through Grotton using the A669 road are operated by Stagecoach Manchester under the Bee Network and connect to Manchester and Oldham via Uppermill, Hyde to Oldham Greenfield, Diggle and Huddersfield.

== See also ==
- Listed buildings in Saddleworth
