= Heights, Greater Manchester =

Coordinates: 53.576°N 2.030°W

Heights
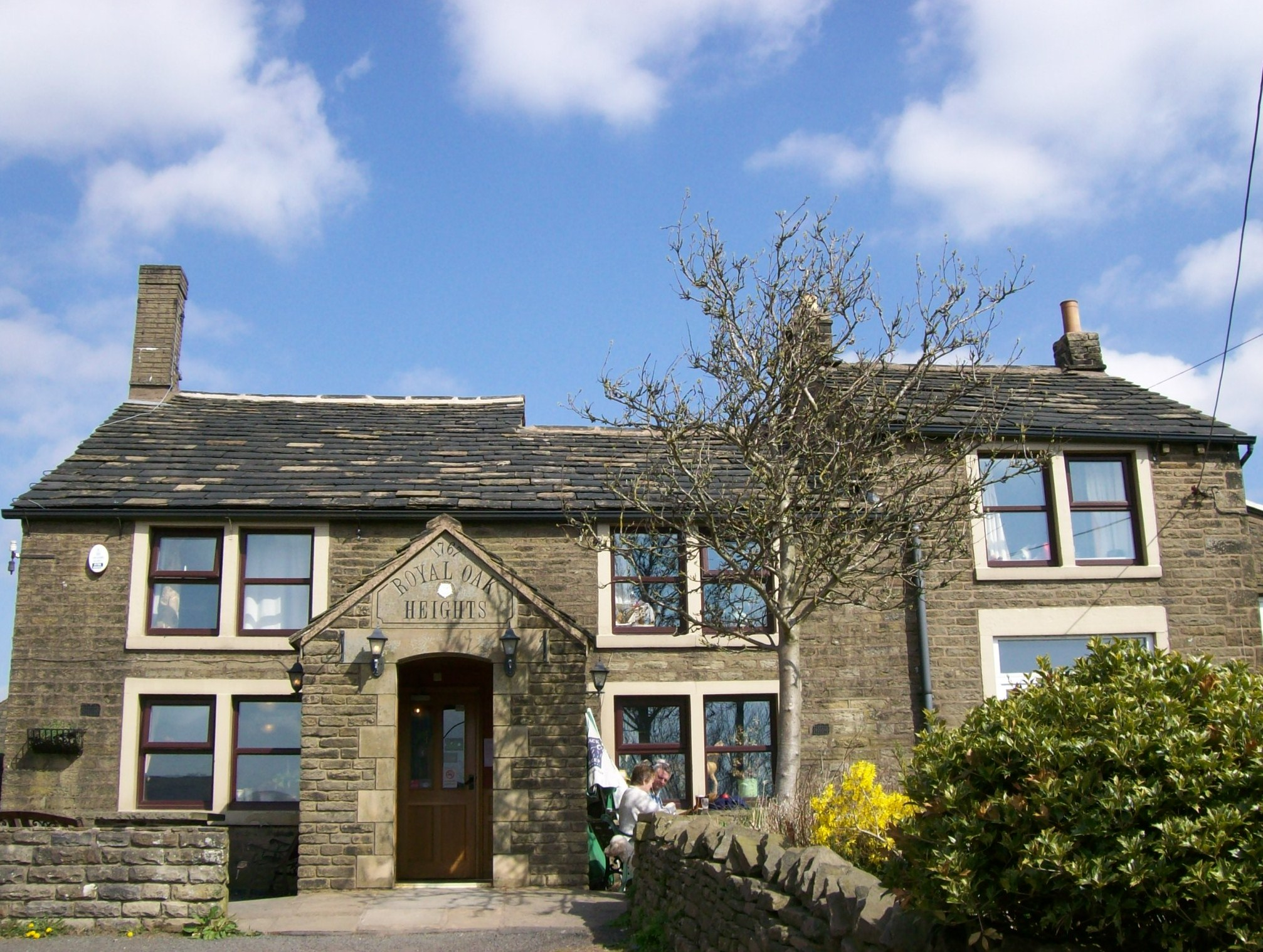
- The Royal Oak public house, Heights

- Location within Greater Manchester
- OS grid reference: SD981089
- Civil parish: Saddleworth
- Metropolitan borough: Oldham
- Metropolitan county: Greater Manchester
- Region: North West
- Country: England
- Sovereign state: United Kingdom
- Post town: OLDHAM
- Postcode district: OL3
- Dialling code: 01457
- Police: Greater Manchester
- Fire: Greater Manchester
- Ambulance: North West
- UK Parliament: Oldham East and Saddleworth

Heights is a hamlet in the Saddleworth parish of the Metropolitan Borough of Oldham, in Greater Manchester, England. It is directly north of Delph, and four miles northeast of Oldham. It lies within the ancient county boundaries of the West Riding of Yorkshire.

Heights consists of a former pub (the Royal Oak Heights) which closed in 2020, some residential buildings and St Thomas' Church, Friarmere. The church is no longer in regular use; burials still take place and the graveyard is maintained. The churchyard and graveyard were featured in the film The Parole Officer starring Steve Coogan.

== Notable people ==
Becket Whitehead, folksong collector ("A Beggin' I Will Go", "Gallant Poacher", "Four Loom Weaver", "Mowing Match", "Jim the Carter's Lad"), lived in Heights Lane Cottage and was buried at St. Thomas Church 1966.
