= Mallalieu =

Mallalieu is a surname, and may refer to:

- Albert Mallalieu (1904–1991) English cricketer
- Andrew Mallalieu, Barbadian politician
- Ann Mallalieu, Baroness Mallalieu (born 1945) English politician and lawyer, daughter of William Mallalieu
- Aubrey Mallalieu (1873–1948) English actor
- Frederick Mallalieu (1860–1932) English politician; father of Lance and William Mallalieu
- H. L. Mallalieu (born 1946), Irish writer on art and antiques
- Harry Mallalieu (1896–1981), English footballer
- J. P. W. Mallalieu (1908–1980) English politician
- Sir Lance Mallalieu (1905–1979) English politician
- Thomas Mallalieu (c.1858–1935), British trade unionist
- Willard Francis Mallalieu (1828–1911) American Methodist bishop
- William Mallalieu (1908–1980), British politician, journalist and author
