= Spotland =

Coordinates: 53.618133°N 2.173114°W

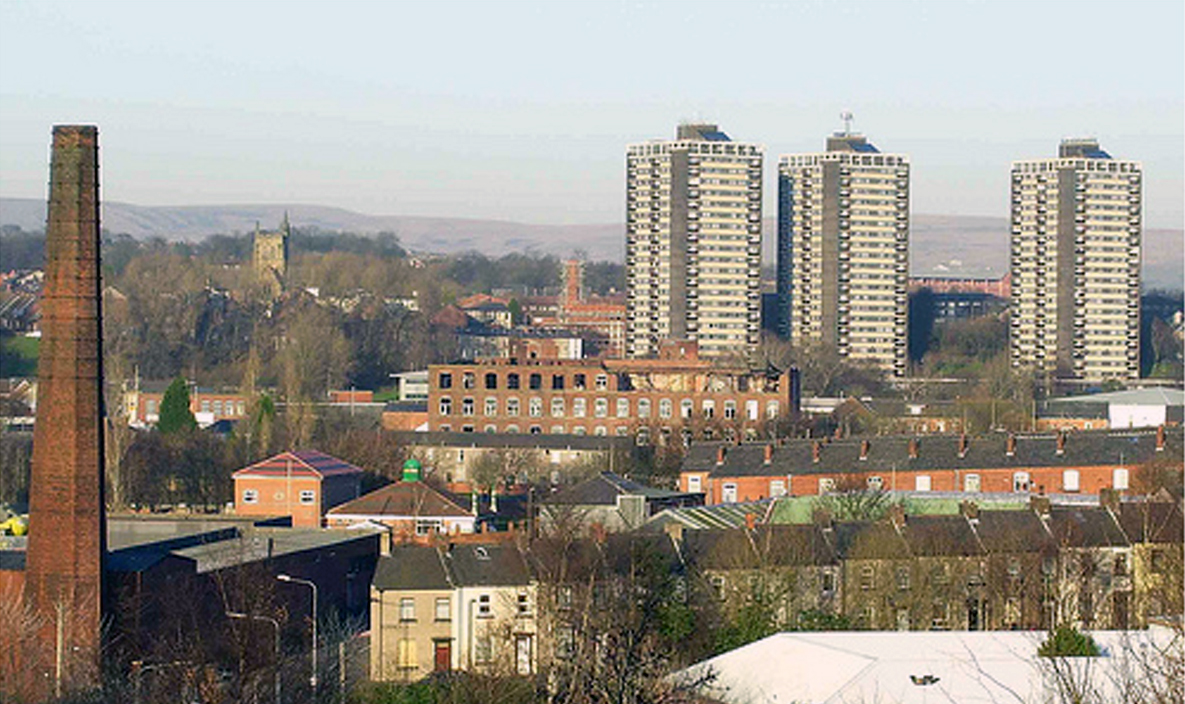
- A view over Spotland in 2008

- Location within Greater Manchester
- Population: 10,805 (2011.Spotland and Falange Ward)
- OS grid reference: SD885135
- Metropolitan borough: Rochdale
- Metropolitan county: Greater Manchester
- Region: North West
- Country: England
- Sovereign state: United Kingdom
- Post town: ROCHDALE
- Postcode district: OL12
- Dialling code: 01706
- Police: Greater Manchester
- Fire: Greater Manchester
- Ambulance: North West

Spotland (/ˈspɒtlænd/ SPOT-land) is a district in the town of Rochdale in Greater Manchester, England. The Rochdale ward name is Spotland and Falinge. The population of this ward at the 2011 census was 10,805. It lies on the River Spodden, and is the home of Spotland Stadium.

Historically a part of Lancashire, Spotland was formerly its own township and chapelry within the ancient parish of Rochdale, in 1866 Spotland became a separate civil parish, in 1894 the parish was abolished to form Rochdale, Whitworth, Bacup and Norden. In 1891 the parish had a population of 37,828.

The name Spotland means "area around the Spodden", Spodden referring to the River Spodden, which itself means "spouting stream".

Spotland Primary School lies within the locality on Edmund Street.
