= Oldham Titans Basketball Club =

The Oldham Titans Basketball Club is the largest recreational Basketball Club in Oldham and Greater Manchester, England. The team is for Men (open age).

The Men's Team has evolved from the former Saddleworth/Salem Basketball Team that has traditionally competed in the Manchester Area Basketball League for over 15 years. The 2004-2005 season brought promotion to Division One of the league. The team finished mid-table in the 2005-2006 season.

Oldham Titans evolved under new ownership (Mark Hamilton) who has progressed the club further so that all youth ages (U13-U18) are all competing at national league standard. As of the 2011-2012 season Mark has set up a new men's league that will compete in the northern national league conference.
