= Dobcross =

Coordinates: 53.557°N 2.014°W

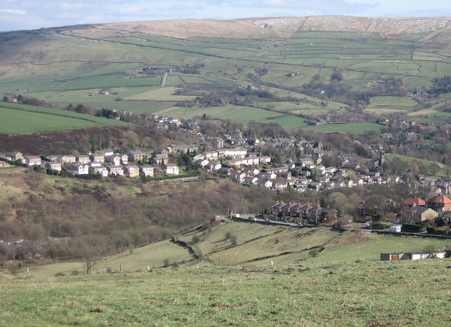
- A view over Dobcross

- Location within Greater Manchester
- OS grid reference: SD990067
  - London: 162 mi (261 km) SSE
- Civil parish: Saddleworth
- Metropolitan borough: Oldham
- Metropolitan county: Greater Manchester
- Region: North West
- Country: England
- Sovereign state: United Kingdom
- Post town: OLDHAM
- Postcode district: OL3
- Dialling code: 01457
- Police: Greater Manchester
- Fire: Greater Manchester
- Ambulance: North West
- UK Parliament: Oldham East and Saddleworth

Dobcross is a village in the civil parish of Saddleworth in the Metropolitan Borough of Oldham in Greater Manchester, England. It is in a valley in the South Pennines, along the course of the River Tame and the Huddersfield Narrow Canal, 4.2 miles (6.8 km) east-northeast of Oldham and 13 miles (21 km) west-southwest of Huddersfield.

Historically a part of the West Riding of Yorkshire, Dobcross was once part of the Lordsmere division of Saddleworth. For centuries, Dobcross was a hamlet sustained by domestic flannel and woollen cloth production. Many of the original 17th and 18th century barns and weavers' cottages survive today as listed buildings.

Together with neighbouring Delph, Dobcross is, geographically, "considered the centre of Saddleworth", although it is not its largest village centre by some margin. Industrial tycoon Henry Platt was born in Dobcross in 1770. John Schlesinger's 1979 film Yanks was filmed on location in Dobcross, and an annual Yanks festival, coupled with a brass band contest on Whit Friday, each contribute to the village's cultural calendar.

== History ==
Dobcross is located at an ancient crossing point of two ancient routes through Saddleworth, one formerly used by trans Pennines traffic between Lancashire and Yorkshire. The name probably originates from ‘Daub’Cross - A muddy crossroads.

At the crossing point of the River Tame lies the site of Walk Mill, a seventeenth century fulling mill. The name derives from the way cloth was once trodden before the introduction of mechanical stocks by which the cloth was beaten with fulling hammers to felt and thicken it.

Beginning with Richard, the Lawton family ran the mill from the mid-seventeenth century. The size of the business can be estimated in that, by 1792, Saddleworth saw the production of 36,637 cloth pieces. From wool to the innkeeping business, the Lawton family continued to be a prominent family in Dobcross through to the early 19th century.

On the morning of Whit Friday, the traditional Whit Walks, a church procession followed by a service, take place in Saddleworth. Saddleworth and District Whit Friday Brass Band contests take place every year on the afternoon and evening of Whit Friday.

The playwright Henry Livings (1929–1998) lived in the village and a Henry Livings Memorial Prize is open to bands who have played on any of the morning's walks.

A former public house in the village, The Nudger, was once owned by the Olympic swimming champion Henry Taylor of Oldham. The pub eventually went bust.

== Governance ==
Lying within the ancient county boundaries of Yorkshire since a very early time, during the Middle Ages, Dobcross lay within the Saddleworth chapelry of the ancient parish of Rochdale. Like the other Yorkshire areas of the ancient parish, it was in the wapentake of Agbrigg, with the Lancashire areas of the ancient parish being in Salfordshire.

Dobcross was created an ecclesiastical parish in 1797. It is currently in Saddleworth Deanery, part of the Archdeaconry of Rochdale, in the Anglican Diocese of Manchester.

From 1894 to 1900, Dobcross lay within the Saddleworth Rural District, a local government district in the administrative County of York, West Riding. In 1900, Dobcross was merged into Saddleworth Urban District, where it stayed until 1974. Under the Local Government Act 1972, the Saddleworth Urban District was abolished, and Dobcross has, since 1 April 1974, formed part of the Metropolitan Borough of Oldham, within Greater Manchester.

Since 1997, Dobcross has formed part of the parliamentary constituency of Oldham East and Saddleworth, and is represented in the House of Commons by Debbie Abrahams, a member of the Labour Party. Between 1983 and 1997 it was in the Littleborough and Saddleworth constituency.

== Demography ==
Dobcross/Uppermill ethnicity compared
2001 UK census	Dobcross/Uppermill	Oldham (borough)	England
Total population	7,475	217,273	49,138,831
White	98.3%	86.1	91%
Asian	0.6%	11.9	4.6%
Black	0.2%	0.6	2.3%

The villages of Dobcross and Uppermill were treated as a single entity by the Office for National Statistics in the 2001 United Kingdom Census. As such, there are no demographic statistics for the village on its own. The statistics given here are for the combined population of Dobcross and Uppermill, which are about half a mile apart.

At the 2001 census, the area had a population of 7,475. Its population density was 10,324 inhabitants per square mile (3,986/km^{2}), with a female-to-male ratio of 100 to 92.6. Of those over 16 years old, 22.5% were single (never married), 49.6% married, and 7.8% divorced. The 3,225 households in the area included 27.7% one-person, 43.2% married couples living together, 8.1% were co-habiting couples, and 6.9% single parents with their children. Of those aged 16–74, 21.1% had no academic qualifications, significantly below the averages of Oldham (37.7%) and England (28.9%).

At the 2001 UK census, 79.6% of residents in the area reported themselves as being Christian, 0.3% Muslim, 0.3% Hindu, 0.2% Buddhist, and 0.2% Jewish. The census recorded 13.3% as having no religion, 0.2% had an alternative religion and 6.0% did not state their religion.

== Transport (as of January 2025) ==
Dobcross railway station closed in 1955 when the Delph Donkey passenger train service from Oldham to Delph via Greenfield was withdrawn. The line remained in use for goods traffic until 1963. The nearest railway station to the village as of January 2024 is Greenfield on the Huddersfield line. An hourly service is provided by TransPennine Express in both directions to Huddersfield and Manchester Piccadilly.

One of the bus routes operated within a nearby proximity of the village of Dobcross is the 184, operated by Stagecoach Manchester as part of the Bee Network. This runs from Huddersfield, and in the opposite direction to Oldham. This service runs along Wool Road, lying just to the east of the village, which is a 5 minute walk from the square. Another service, which runs through Dobcross Square, is the 356 which runs from Oldham, Diggle and Denshaw to Ashton-under-Lyne. This service is operated by Diamond North West under the Bee Network.

Other services operating through the village include Stagecoach Manchester (Bee Network) service 350 (Ashton - Oldham, every 30 minutes) which serves Dobcross New Road.

== See also ==
- Listed buildings in Saddleworth
