= Listed buildings in Saddleworth =

Saddleworth is a civil parish in the Metropolitan Borough of Oldham, Greater Manchester, England. It lies between the town of Oldham and the Pennine hills, and it is largely rural, with agricultural land and moorland. It also includes suburban areas to the east of Oldham. The principal settlements are Austerlands, Delph, Denshaw, Diggle, Dobcross, Grasscroft, Greenfield, Grotton, Lydgate, Springhead, and Uppermill. The parish contains 385 listed buildings that are recorded in the National Heritage List for England. Of these, five are listed at Grade II*, the middle grade, and the others are at Grade II, the lowest grade.

The list has been divided into two sections according to the dates of earliest construction as follows:

- Listed buildings in Saddleworth to 1800
- Listed buildings in Saddleworth from 1800
