= Thomas Steele (VC) =

Recipient of the Victoria Cross and rugby league footballer

- Born: 6 February 1891; Springhead, Yorkshire, England
- Died: 11 July 1978 (aged 87); Springhead, Greater Manchester, England
- Military career
- Allegiance: United Kingdom
- Branch: British Army
- Rank: Sergeant
- Units: The Seaforth Highlanders
- Conflicts: World War I
- Awards: Victoria Cross
- Other work: Rugby league player

Thomas Steele VC (6 February 1891 – 11 July 1978) was an English recipient of the Victoria Cross, the highest and most prestigious award for gallantry in the face of the enemy that can be awarded to British and Commonwealth forces. A soldier with the Seaforth Highlanders during the First World War, he was awarded the VC for his actions on 22 February 1917, during the Mesopotamian campaign.

== VC action ==
He was 26 years old, and a sergeant in the 1st Battalion, Seaforth Highlanders (Ross-shire Buffs, Duke of Albany's), British Army during the First World War when the following deed took place for which he was awarded the VC.

On 22 February 1917 near Sanna-y-Yat, Mesopotamia, at a critical moment when a strong enemy counter-attack had temporarily regained some of the captured trenches, Sergeant Steele helped a comrade to carry a machine-gun into position. He kept this gun in action until relieved and was mainly instrumental in keeping the rest of the line intact. Some hours later another counter-attack enabled the enemy to reoccupy a portion of the captured trenches and Sergeant Steele rallied the troops, encouraging them to remain in their trenches and leading a number of them forward, helped to re-establish our line. On this occasion he was severely wounded.

== Rugby league ==
Steele played three matches as a professional for Broughton Rangers, one of rugby league's founding clubs, and enjoyed a distinguished career as an amateur with his local club, Healey Street.
