= Scouthead =

Coordinates: 53.549°N 2.047°W

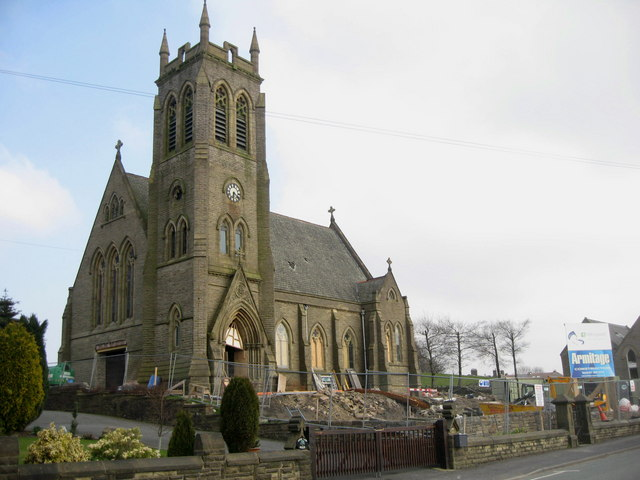
- St Paul's, Scouthead

- Location within Greater Manchester
- OS grid reference: SD968058
- Civil parish: Saddleworth
- Metropolitan borough: Oldham
- Metropolitan county: Greater Manchester
- Region: North West
- Country: England
- Sovereign state: United Kingdom
- Post town: OLDHAM
- Postcode district: OL4
- Dialling code: 0161
- Police: Greater Manchester
- Fire: Greater Manchester
- Ambulance: North West
- UK Parliament: Oldham East and Saddleworth

Scouthead is a village in the civil parish of Saddleworth in the Metropolitan Borough of Oldham, in Greater Manchester, England. It is traversed by the A62 road, and occupies a hillside amongst the Pennines.

Historically a part of the West Riding of Yorkshire, Scouthead stands on the old Wool Road between Lancashire and Yorkshire and contains several hostelries which were once important staging posts along the road. Scouthead hosts an annual band contest on Whit Friday.

Scouthead occupies outlying land to the east of the Waterhead area of Oldham, and Austerlands area of Saddleworth. For purposes of the Office for National Statistics, Scouthead forms the eastern fringe of the Greater Manchester Urban Area.

== Transport ==
Buses servicing Scouthead travel to Oldham, Ashton via Saddleworth, Uppermill, Manchester Piccadilly Gardens. Delph, Scouthead and Springhead.
