= Albert Mallalieu =

English cricketer

Personal information
- Full name: Albert Edward Mallalieu
- Born: 13 January 1904; Delph, Yorkshire, England
- Died: March 1991 (aged 87); Huddersfield, Yorkshire, England
- Batting: Right-handed

Domestic team information
- Years: Team
- 1924–1930: Wales

Career statistics
Competition	First-class
Matches	6
Runs scored	137
Batting average	17.12
100s/50s	–/1
Top score	66
Balls bowled	–
Wickets	–
Bowling average	–
5 wickets in innings	–
10 wickets in match	–
Best bowling	–
Catches/stumpings	2/–
- Source: Cricinfo, 28 August 2011

Albert Edward Mallalieu (13 January 1904 – March 1991) was an English cricketer. Mallalieu was a right-handed batsman. He was born in Delph, Saddleworth, Yorkshire.

Mallalieu his first-class debut for Wales against Scotland in 1924. He made five further first-class appearances for Wales, the last of which came against the Marylebone Cricket Club in 1930. In his six first-class appearances, he scored 137 runs at an average of 17.12, with a high score of 66. His score, his only first-class fifty, came against Ireland in 1925.

He died in March 1991 in Huddersfield, Yorkshire.
