= Denshaw =

Village in Saddleworth, Greater Manchester

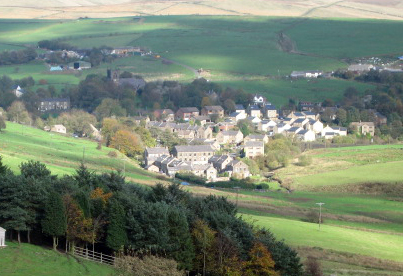
- View of Denshaw

- Location within Greater Manchester
- Population: 500
- OS grid reference: SD974106
  - London: 165 mi (266 km) SSE
- Civil parish: Saddleworth
- Metropolitan borough: Oldham
- Metropolitan county: Greater Manchester
- Region: North West
- Country: England
- Sovereign state: United Kingdom
- Post town: OLDHAM
- Postcode district: OL3
- Dialling code: 01457
- Police: Greater Manchester
- Fire: Greater Manchester
- Ambulance: North West
- UK Parliament: Oldham East and Saddleworth

Denshaw is a village in the civil parish of Saddleworth in the Metropolitan Borough of Oldham, in Greater Manchester, England. It lies by the source of the River Tame, high amongst the Pennines above the village of Delph, 4.6 miles (7.4 km) northeast of Oldham, 3.3 miles (5.3 km) north-northwest of Uppermill and Shaw and Crompton. It has a population of around 500.

Historically a part of the West Riding of Yorkshire, Denshaw and its surroundings have provided archaeological evidence of Stone and Bronze Age activity in the area. The name Denshaw is of Old Norse derivation, and the oldest part of the village is an ancient hamlet.

Built up around the junction of five major roads, until the 20th century, Denshaw consisted mainly of smallholdings and a few public houses such as the Junction Inn, originally built as a coaching house for travellers. Denshaw is noted for its annual Whit Friday brass band contest.

== History ==
There is evidence of Stone Age activity around Denshaw; in 2004 Saddleworth Archaeological Trust objected to the construction of a wind farm on a site on Denshaw Moor which had produced more than 200 Mesolithic artefacts. Human activity in Denshaw continued in the Bronze Age, as demonstrated by the discovery of a palstave on Wall Green in 1932, when a trench was being dug for a water pipe, and some tools from Denshaw Moor, on the site of the proposed wind farm, which include a ceremonial flint dagger. A Roman road may also cross the site.

The name Denshaw is derived from Old Norse, suggesting a settlement may have existed there during the period of the Danelaw. Denshaw Fold, the oldest part of the village, is an isolated hamlet of ancient origin. Many of the traditional stone dwellings are listed buildings and are descendants of the cluster of houses first built in the locality during the 16th century. Around 1795, the Junction Inn at Denshaw was erected. It served as a posting house on the Ripponden-to-Oldham turnpike road (opened in 1798) for the changing of horses and the provision of refreshments.

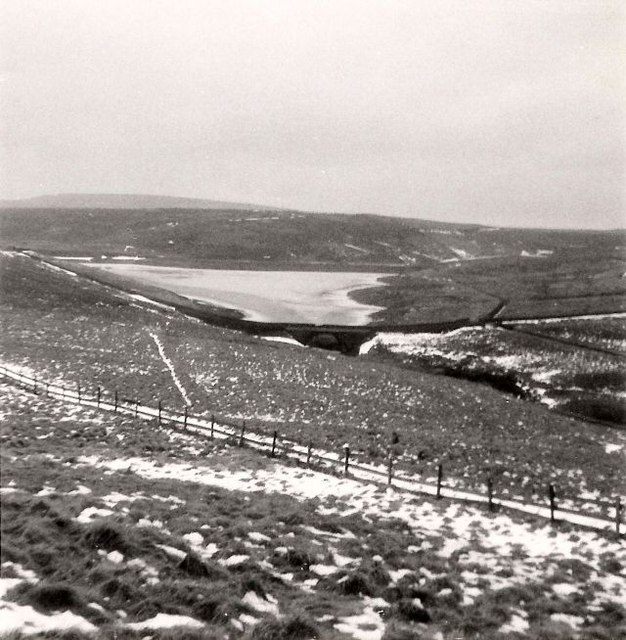
Dowry Reservoir, pictured here in 1967, was built in the late 19th century at the height of the Second Industrial Revolution.

Denshaw did not experience the same rate of urbanisation and industrialisation as its surrounding settlements during the Industrial Revolution, and it did not become a mill town or a centre of the local cotton mill boom as did nearby Rochdale, Milnrow and Oldham. However, Denshaw Vale was a calico printing factory which was "an important concern that employed a workforce of 150" during the 19th century. Furthermore, Denshaw was chosen as the site of a reservoir which local mills were to contribute monies and thereby use; In 1828, Rackenden Deign Reservoir was built by Denshaw to provide for 24 watermills. In 1818 an Oddfellows Lodge was erected in the village. In 1887, Denshaw was documented having a population of 1,279.

In 2003, energy company E.ON UK proposed the installation of seven 350-foot (107 m) wind turbines at Denshaw. This was met with opposition from the local and wider communities, culminating in the Saddleworth Moors Action Group, who were joined by environmentalist David Bellamy. The council received over 1,000 letters objecting to the proposed wind farm, and although initially accepted by the former Liberal Democrat local authority, the application was rejected by Labour-controlled Oldham Metropolitan Borough Council on 1 March 2006.

On 23 May 2007, Denshaw's post office (which doubled-up as the village's only shop) was the centre of a robbery. The "tiny premises" had been under threat of closure owing to Post Office's modernisation plans and has since closed.

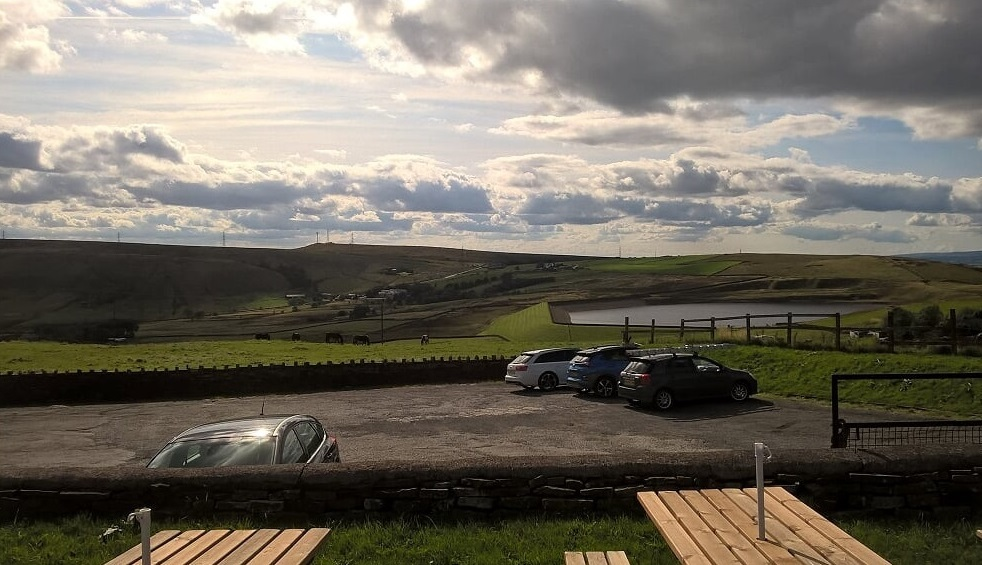
Crompton Moor, seen from The Rams Head Inn

On 17 April 2008, local, national and international media reported on Denshaw's entry on Wikipedia which had been vandalised with spoof information, although the offending material was removed after initial reports were published. The story featured on the BBC's North West Tonight, a regional news programme, and later picked up by news services as far away as Pakistan.

== Governance ==
Lying within the ancient county boundaries of Yorkshire since a very early time, during the Middle Ages, Denshaw lay within the Saddleworth chapelry of the ancient parish of Rochdale. Like the other Yorkshire areas of the ancient parish, it was in the wapentake of Agbrigg in Yorkshire, with the Lancashire areas of the ancient parish being in Salfordshire.

The Byrons (including Romantic poet George Gordon Byron) were prominent land owners in Denshaw. Denshaw was created an ecclesiastical parish in 1864, out of the former Friarmere parochial chapelry. It was in the deanery of Ashton-under-Lyne from 1864 to 1872. It then became part of Rochdale deanery until 1881 when it again became part of Ashton-under-Lyne. In 1929, it transferred to Oldham deanery. It is currently in Saddleworth Deanery, part of the Archdeanery of Rochdale, in the Anglican Diocese of Manchester.

From 1894 to 1900, Denshaw lay within Saddleworth Rural District, a local government district in the administrative County of York, West Riding. In 1900, Denshaw was merged into Saddleworth Urban District, where it stayed until 1974. Under the Local Government Act 1972, the Saddleworth Urban District was abolished, and Denshaw has, since 1 April 1974, formed part of the Metropolitan Borough of Oldham, within Greater Manchester. Denshaw lies within the Saddleworth North electoral ward.

Since 1997, Denshaw has formed part of the parliamentary constituency of Oldham East and Saddleworth, and is represented in the House of Commons by Debbie Abrahams, a member of the Labour Party. Between 1983 and 1997 it was in the Littleborough and Saddleworth constituency.

== Geography ==
At 53°35′32″N 2°2′19″W (53.5921°, −2.0385°) and 165 miles (266 km) north-northwest of London, Denshaw stands about 990 feet (302 m) above sea level, 11.4 miles (18.3 km) northeast of Manchester city centre, on elevated Pennine ground by the River Tame, which flows southwesterly from its source near the Dowry and New Year's Bridge reservoirs. The land-use of Denshaw, which centres on a road junction, is predominantly residential, the outlying land being a mixture of permanent grassland and heath.

Denshaw lies amongst the South Pennines, and is topographically characterised by hilly, upland terrain. Denshaw is not contiguous with any other settlement and for purposes of the Office for National Statistics, does not form part of the Greater Manchester Urban Area.

Denshaw experiences a temperate maritime climate, like much of the British Isles, with relatively cool summers and mild winters. There is regular but generally light precipitation throughout the year.

There are a number of small named-localities in and around Denshaw, including Denshaw Fold, Cherry Clough, Junction, Old Tame, Slackcote, Grains Bar, and Woodbrow.

== Landmarks ==
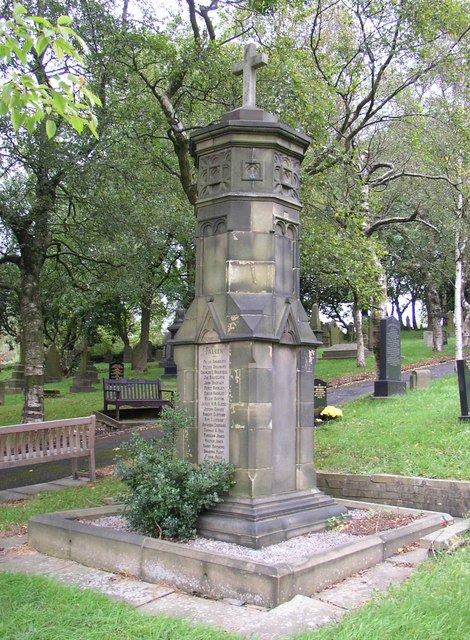
Denshaw's war memorial is situated in the village churchyard.

Christ Church is Denshaw's parish church. It is part of the Church of England and lies within the Anglican Diocese of Manchester. A Grade II listed building since 19 June 1967, Christ Church dates from 1863, the year before Denshaw became an ecclesiastical parish. It was built by Henry Gartside, a resident of Denshaw.

Denshaw War Memorial lies within the churchyard. It was erected by public subscription "in honour of the men who fell and served" in the First and Second World Wars. The monument has Rolls of Honour containing the 32 names of those from Denshaw who fought and died in these wars.

== Transport ==
Denshaw lies 2.5 miles (4.0 km) south of the M62 motorway, at a road junction where the A640, A672 and A6052 roads intersect. There are no rail services in Denshaw. Following closure of the Oldham Loop Line, the nearest railway station to Denshaw is located at Greenfield.

Denshaw is served by the 356 bus service previously ran by Nexus Move (Ashton-Under-Lyne) that runs between Oldham, Denshaw, Diggle, Uppermill, Greenfield, Mossley, Stalybridge and Ashton-under-Lyne. The service runs hourly on Weekdays and Saturdays, with service on Sunday dropping to every two hours. Since the 5th of January 2025, the 356 is now under the control of the Bee Network and is contracted to Diamond Bus North West as part of Tranche 3 of franchising.

Denshaw was previously served by routes such as the 407 between Denshaw and Oldham via Moorside. The 407 ran hourly daily with all days expect Sundays being run by Stotts Tours with Sunday runs being covered by Stagecoach Manchester. Additionally, Denshaw was served by the 354 bus route that ran towards Ashton-under-Lyne following the route of the modern day 356. During its time of operation, it was run by First Greater Manchester every two hours Mon-Sun with a Local Link Demand-responsive transport system covering the evening journeys.

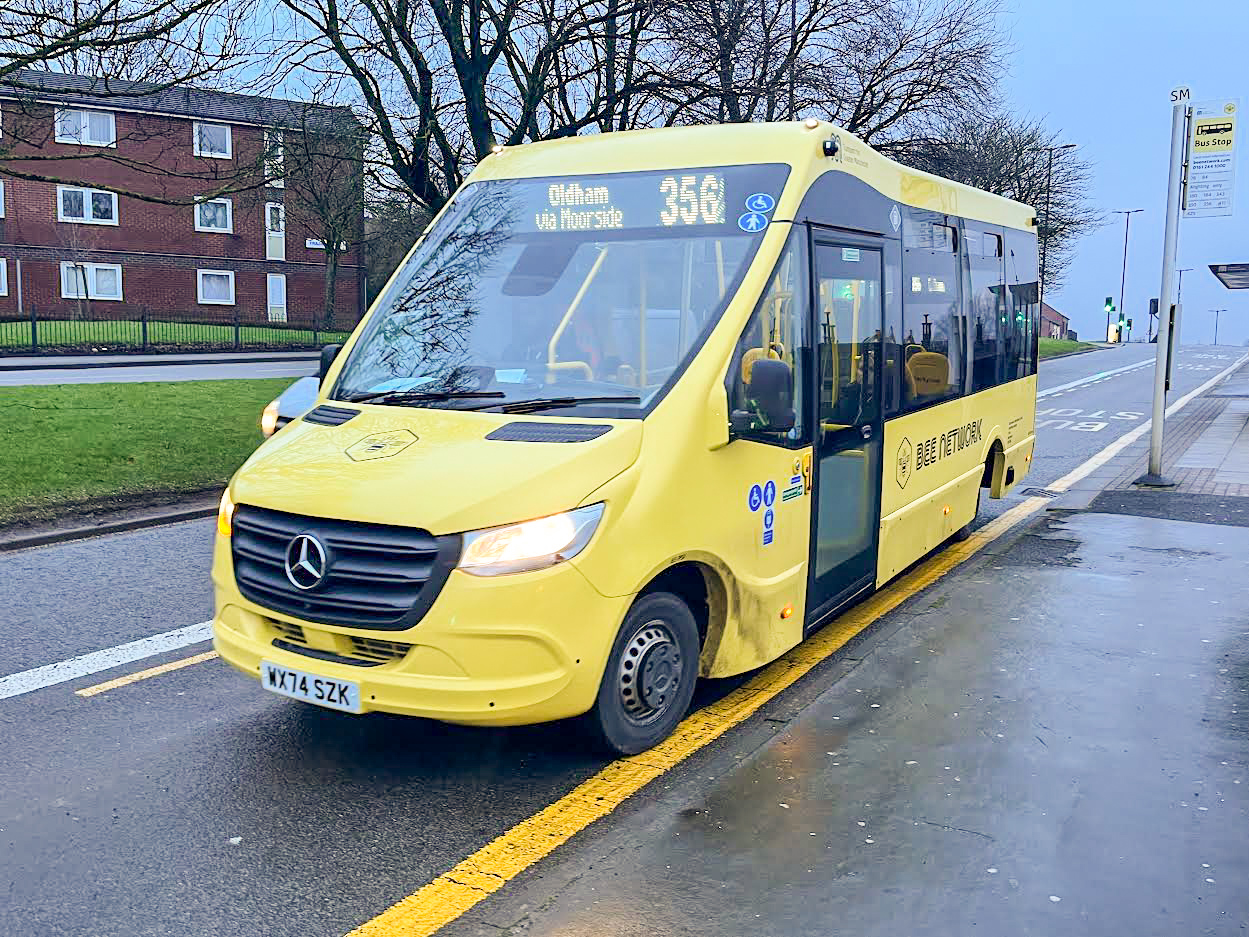
Bee Network Mellor Strata operating the 356 which runs through Denshaw.

== Culture and community ==
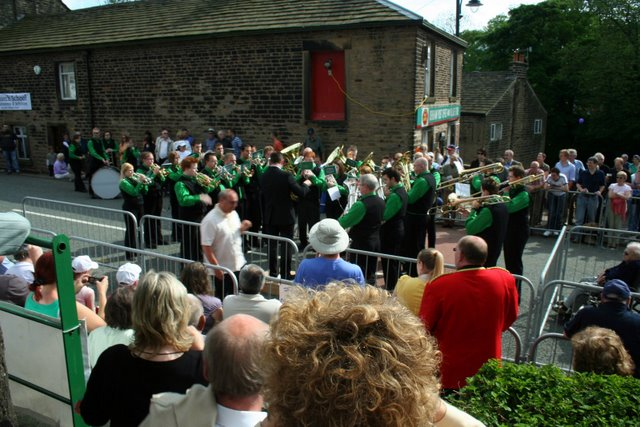
Since 1993, Denshaw has held an annual brass band contest.

Denshaw is noted for its annual brass band contest, held on every Whit Friday. The Denshaw Whit Friday Band Contest was established in 1993 and in its first year attracted 25 bands.

Denshaw has a primary school named Christ Church Primary. It is a denominational school with the Church of England, linked with Denshaw's parish church.

Denshaw village hall is the home of an amateur dramatic group and hosts various village activities; the hall was awarded a grant of £10,000 by the Awards for All scheme, a small grants scheme run by the National Lottery.

Denshaw is referred to in Barclay James Harvest's 1993 song Ballad of Denshaw Mill.

== Public services ==
Home Office policing in Denshaw is provided by the Greater Manchester Police. The force's "(Q) Division" have their headquarters for policing the Metropolitan Borough of Oldham at central Oldham; Denshaw's nearest police station is at Uppermill. Public transport is co-ordinated by Transport for Greater Manchester. Statutory emergency fire and rescue service is provided by the Greater Manchester Fire and Rescue Service.

There are no hospitals in Denshaw, the nearest being the Royal Oldham Hospital, in neighbouring Oldham. Pennine Acute Hospitals NHS Trust is the local NHS Trust. The North West Ambulance Service provides emergency patient transport to and from Denshaw. Other forms of health care are provided for locally by several small clinics and surgeries in and around Saddleworth.

Waste management is co-ordinated by the local authority via the Greater Manchester Combined Authority. Locally produced inert waste for disposal is sent to landfill at the Beal Valley. Denshaw's distribution network operator for electricity is United Utilities. United Utilities also manages Denshaw's drinking and waste water; water supplies being sourced from several local reservoirs, including Dovestone and Chew.

== See also ==
- Listed buildings in Saddleworth
