= Austerlands =

Coordinates: 53.5463°N 2.0550°W

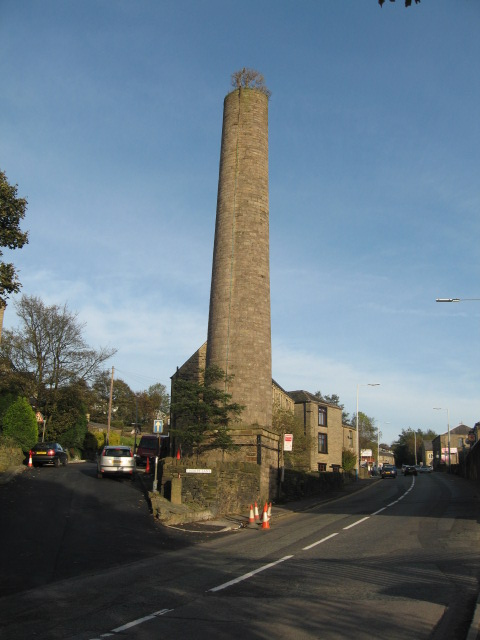
- The chimney of the former Austerlands Mill, a local landmark

- Location within Greater Manchester
- OS grid reference: SD963055
- Civil parish: Saddleworth
- Metropolitan borough: Oldham
- Metropolitan county: Greater Manchester
- Region: North West
- Country: England
- Sovereign state: United Kingdom
- Post town: OLDHAM
- Postcode district: OL4
- Dialling code: 0161/01457
- Police: Greater Manchester
- Fire: Greater Manchester
- Ambulance: North West
- UK Parliament: Oldham East and Saddleworth

Austerlands is a suburban area of Saddleworth, a civil parish within the Metropolitan Borough of Oldham, in Greater Manchester, England. It occupies a hillside amongst the Pennines, between the villages of Lees and Scouthead. It is traversed by the A62 road.

Historically, Austerlands has been positioned on the West Riding of Yorkshire side of the ancient county boundary with Lancashire. The chimney of the former Austerlands Mill is a local landmark.

Austerlands is contiguous with Waterhead area of Oldham, the village of Lees and Scouthead and Springhead areas of Saddleworth. For purposes of the Office for National Statistics, Austerlands forms the eastern fringe of the Greater Manchester Urban Area.

== See also ==
- Listed buildings in Saddleworth
