= Saddleworth =

Civil parish in Greater Manchester, England

Coordinates: 53.55°N 2°W

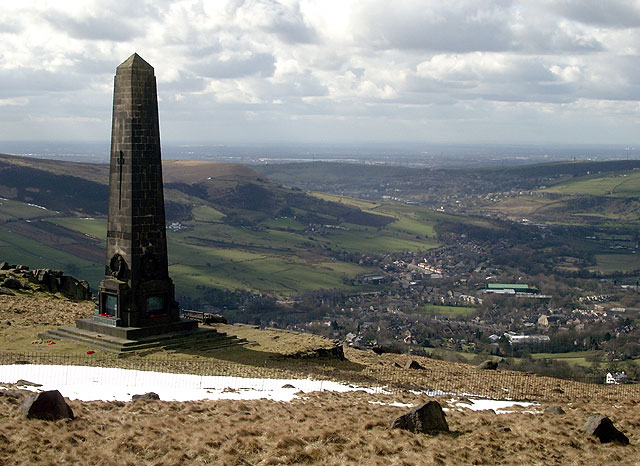
- The Obelisk on Alderman's Hill overlooking Greenfield towards Oldham

- Saddleworth shown within Greater Manchester
- Interactive map of Saddleworth
- Area: 29.4 sq mi (76 km^{2})
- Population: 30,755 (2011 Census)
  - Density: 828/sq mi (320/km^{2})
- OS grid reference: SD995061
  - London: 161 mi (259 km) SSE
- Civil parish: Saddleworth
- Metropolitan borough: Oldham
- Metropolitan county: Greater Manchester
- Region: North West
- Country: England
- Sovereign state: United Kingdom
- Post town: OLDHAM
- Postcode district: OL3, OL4
- Dialling code: 01457, 0161
- Police: Greater Manchester
- Fire: Greater Manchester
- Ambulance: North West
- UK Parliament: Oldham East and Saddleworth
- Website: Saddleworth Parish Council

Saddleworth is a civil parish of the Metropolitan Borough of Oldham in Greater Manchester, England. It comprises several villages and hamlets as well as suburbs of Oldham on the west side of the Pennine hills.

Areas include Austerlands, Delph, Denshaw, Diggle, Dobcross, Friezland, Grasscroft, Greenfield, Grotton, Lydgate, Scouthead, Springhead and Uppermill.

Saddleworth lies east of Oldham and 11 miles (18 kilometres) northeast of Manchester. It is broadly rural and had a population of 25,460 at the 2011 Census, making it one of the larger civil parishes in the United Kingdom.

Historically in the West Riding of Yorkshire and following the Industrial Revolution, in the 18th and 19th centuries, Saddleworth became a centre for cotton spinning and weaving. By the end of Queen Victoria's reign, mechanised textile production had become a vital part of the local economy. The Royal George Mill, owned by the Whitehead family, manufactured felt used for pianofortes, billiard tables and flags.

Following the Great Depression Saddleworth's textile sector declined. Much of Saddleworth's architecture and infrastructure dates from its textile processing days however, notably the Saddleworth Viaduct and several cottages and terraces, many built by the local mill owners.

For centuries Saddleworth was linked, ecclesiastically, with the parish of Rochdale and was long talked of as the part of Yorkshire where Lancastrians lived. The former Saddleworth Urban District was the only part of the West Riding to have been amalgamated into Greater Manchester in 1974. However, strong cultural links with Yorkshire remain amongst its communities. There are several brass bands in the parish.

== History ==
=== Early history ===
The first documentary evidence of Saddleworth appears in the Domesday Book of 1086, in which it is referred to as "Quick", spelt "Thoac"; where it is described as "Land of the King in Eurvicsire (Yorkshire), Agbrigg Wapentake."

The history of the region clearly dates further back than the Domesday Book however. Place names derived from Celtic and Anglian dialects, along with the discovery of flint arrowheads and gold Viking rings all point to a much earlier Saddleworth, possibly as old as the Stone Age. A Roman road from Chester to York passed through the area. Castleshaw Roman fort was built to defend and patrol the local section of the road. The first fort on the site was an Agricolan-period fort, built in turf and timber c. AD 79. This was refurbished soon after construction and then abandoned c. AD 95. Within the south eastern half of the fort, a fortlet was constructed, also in turf and timber, c. AD 105. This was redeveloped during its brief occupation and then abandoned again c. AD 125. In the Saddleworth area is a bowl barrow, which may be Bronze Age, located at grid reference SD98010746. Despite excavations, no grave goods or human remains have been found in the barrow.

=== Industrial history ===
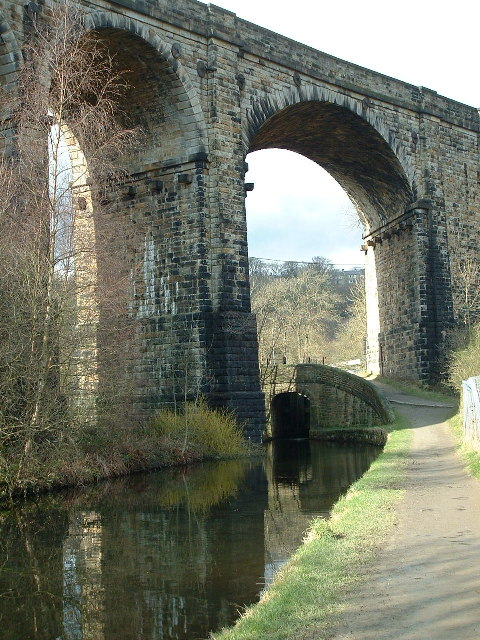
Saddleworth Viaduct was built originally to aid the transporting of goods during the Industrial Revolution, as was the Huddersfield Narrow Canal, which passes under it.

The steep slopes of the Saddleworth area and the acidic soils of the region have never been particularly conducive to intensive farming; meaning that long before the Victorian era, Saddleworth already had a long established, albeit domestic, textile tradition. Small, basic mills had been existent in Saddleworth before the industrial revolution, but these were increasingly replaced by larger more intensive establishments. By the end of Queen Victoria's reign, mechanised textile production had become a vital part of the local economy.

The boom in industry that had occurred in Saddleworth during the Industrial Revolution called for greater transport links. Construction of the Huddersfield Narrow Canal was begun in 1794, at the height of Canal Mania, connecting Huddersfield to Stalybridge via Saddleworth and completed seventeen years later in 1811; when the Standedge Canal Tunnel at Diggle was finally opened. The decline of canals and the rise of steam powered locomotives left the canal falling behind the competition, and so it was decided that a railway tunnel would be built parallel to the canal, which was completed in 1848. The rise in traffic demanded a second tunnel be built, completed in 1871. Both of these were single line tunnels and eventually superseded by the 1894 tunnel, a double line tunnel, which is the only one of the three still regularly carrying passengers.

The three brothers, Ralph Radcliffe Whitehead, James Heywood Whitehead and Francis Frederick Whitehead, were extremely philanthropic and amongst other bequests in the 1850s built Christ Church in Friezland along with the Parsonage, School and Headmaster's house. The land on which these were built was purchased in 1849 from L. & N.W. Railway Company. The Church School has been rebuilt and the Parsonage and grounds, built in the Gothic Revival style and referred to in Pevsner's Guide, has become a Grade II listed building, now in private hands. The boom in industry called for greater transport links, including the Huddersfield Narrow Canal and several railways.

Unlike the majority of the Oldham Metropolitan Borough, where the industrial architecture was generally constructed from Accrington redbrick, Saddleworth's textiles mills and supporting infrastructure was made from the local millstone grit. This is in keeping with other settlements amongst the southwest Pennines, such as Milnrow near Rochdale.

== Governance ==
Although on the western side of the Pennine watershed, Saddleworth, or 'Quick' as it was once known, has lain within the historic county boundaries of Yorkshire since the Middle Ages. From a very ancient time, the area formed part of the Agbrigg Wapentake, in the "Land of the King in Eurvicsire" (Yorkshire).

For a time, during the 17th century, Saddleworth constituted a chapelry within the ancient parish of Rochdale in Salfordshire, the other parts of which were entirely in the ancient county of Lancashire.

In 1866 it became a civil parish in its own right and in 1889 became part of the administrative county of the West Riding of Yorkshire. In 1894 the parish's boundaries were altered with the parts in Quickmere Middle Division (Springhead), Mossley and Uppermill becoming Urban Districts. The residue became a single-parish rural district.

In 1872, Saddleworth was recorded to be "a hamlet, a chapelry, a township, and a district, in Rochdale parish and West Riding of Yorkshire". At this time, a post office for the area was found under the name of Uppermill which was under Manchester.

In 1900 the boundaries were changed again with the inclusion of Uppermill, and the single-parish rural district being instead replaced by the "Saddleworth Urban District". In 1937 it incorporated Springhead Urban District.

Under the Local Government Act 1972, the West Riding County Council was abolished and Saddleworth was incorporated, for administrative purposes, into the Metropolitan Borough of Oldham in the metropolitan county of Greater Manchester.

Unlike neighbouring Shaw and Crompton, Saddleworth is a successor parish, and thus was automatically granted civil parish status in 1974, when its urban district status was abolished. Up until 1996, Saddleworth's official postal county was Lancashire, due to it forming part of the Oldham post town. Postal counties were abolished in 1996.

=== Parliamentary representation ===
Saddleworth forms part of the Oldham East and Saddleworth parliamentary constituency, of which the Member of Parliament is Debbie Abrahams. It is split into three electoral wards; Saddleworth North, Saddleworth South and Saddleworth West and Lees

== Geography ==
Saddleworth makes up around 52% 29.4 square miles (76 km^{2}) of the Metropolitan Borough of Oldham in terms of area, and remains largely rural. Saddleworth Moor in the Dark Peak area of the Peak District National Park is a moorland plateau that straddles the boundary with West Yorkshire.

Bounded directly to the west by Oldham and the Metropolitan Borough of Rochdale in the north, Tameside in the south and Kirklees in the east. Saddleworth is 12 miles (19 km) southwest of Huddersfield.

=== Settlements ===
Saddleworth contains a collection of villages and hamlets, including:

Settlement	Population	OS Grid reference	Image
Austerlands	c. 350		
Castleshaw	c. 350		
Delph	c. 2,000	grid reference SD984080	
Denshaw	c. 500	grid reference SD974106	
Diggle	c. 1,500	grid reference SE017083	
Dobcross	c. 1,000		
Friezland	c. 350		
Grasscroft	c. 900		
Greenfield	c. 5,000	grid reference SD995061	
Grotton	c. 3,000		
Heights	c. 10	grid reference SD981089	
Lydgate	c. 350		
Scouthead	c. 750		
Springhead	c.2,000	grid reference SD963052	
Uppermill	7,475	grid reference SD938090	

== Demography ==
At the 2001 UK census, Saddleworth had a total population of 24,351. For every 100 females, there were 94.7 males. The average household size was 2.39. Of those aged 16–74 in Saddleworth, 45.3% had no academic qualifications or one GCSE, lower than the figures for all of the Metropolitan Borough of Oldham (55.2%) and about the same for England (45.5%). According to the census, 1.9% were unemployed and 28.2% were economically inactive. 18.5% of the population were under the age of 16 and 7.3% were aged 75 and over; the mean age of the people of Saddleworth was 40.92. 71.5% of residents described their health as 'good'.

=== Population change ===
Population growth in Saddleworth since 1901
Year	1901	1911	1921	1931	1939	1951	1961	1971	2001	2011
Population	12,320	12,603	12,562	12,574	17,064	16,761	17,024	20,575	24,351	25,460
Source: A Vision of Britain through Time

== Culture ==
=== Identity ===
Since the local government reforms of 1974, some of the people of Saddleworth have been uneasy about their primary geographic reference frame, with parts of the local community feeling aggrieved at Saddleworth forming part of Greater Manchester. Saddleworth, where the local architecture of stone cottages is of the Yorkshire type, is the only part of the Metropolitan Borough of Oldham to come from the historic county boundaries of Yorkshire, the rest being from Lancashire. It is also the only part of the metropolitan county of Greater Manchester which lay within those borders.

The Saddleworth White Rose Society organises events every Yorkshire Day (1 August) to promote its contention that Saddleworth remains part of the West Riding of Yorkshire. The Prince of Wales referred to Saddleworth's continuing Yorkshire status when he visited the area in 2001 saying "The fact that Saddleworth is still part of the historic West Riding is extremely important".

In 2004, public meetings were held to discuss the feasibility of splitting Saddleworth from the Borough of Oldham. Some residents at the time said they would prefer to become part of the metropolitan county of West Yorkshire or a new South Pennine authority, connecting rural towns and villages on both sides of the border. Even though such a move could involve merging with the neighbouring Metropolitan Borough of Kirklees, Oldham councillors maintained the split was not feasible as Saddleworth does not have sufficient hospital provision, civic buildings, transport, schooling nor other infrastructure in its own right. Councillor Ken Hulme arranged a meeting for the matter to be discussed. One councillor remarked "They [Saddleworth] want a bigger slice of the pie than the rest of the borough. The people of the rest of Oldham are not going to subsidise Saddleworth, and Saddleworth can't go it alone. It couldn't afford to provide the services it needs."

In 2010, Oldham Metropolitan Borough Council erected new signs along its boundaries. Those marking the boundary of Saddleworth say 'in the historic County of York' at the top, alongside a white rose. Later in the year, signs were unveiled by local dignitaries at Grains Bar marking the historic border between Lancashire and Yorkshire.

=== Whit Friday ===
Saddleworth has a large number of annual customs and traditions, many of which are held during Whitsuntide. On Whit Friday morning, congregations from the churches of all of the Saddleworth villages hold their Walk of Witness and congregate in Uppermill to take part in a religious service. Later in the evening, the Whit Friday brass band contests take place. The band contests originated in Saddleworth and the nearby towns of Mossley and Stalybridge in 1884 and are still centred on the local area. The first band to win in Uppermill was the Wyke Temperance Band. Bands from around the country, and indeed the world, travel to the area annually to compete. Due to the huge popularity of the event, Whit Friday band contests are now held in others of Saddleworth's surrounding villages. In the village of Dobcross a Henry Livings memorial prize is open to bands who play on any of the morning's walks on Whit Friday.

=== Sadd Fest ===
The Festival spotlights musical talent from local bands and artists to raise money for charity. This event was started in 2013 by the Saddleworth branch of the Round Table as an alternative to the prior 'Beer Walk' event which was cancelled in 2011. The beer walk started in 1973. Participants walked around Saddleworth in fancy dress, stopping at pubs. Spectators were encouraged to donate money for charity. It was organised for 39 years, however due to 4,000 (approx) unofficial walkers taking part in the event, in addition to the 2,500 official walkers, the police estimated it would cost £58,000 to stage the walk in 2012. However, some people continue to do the walk unofficially.

=== Yanks Weekend ===
The event started in 2001 to celebrate the local filming of the Hollywood film Yanks in 1979 starring Richard Gere. Many locations in Uppermill and neighbouring Dobcross were used in the film.

=== Sport ===
- Saddleworth Cricket Club play home matches at their Well-i-Hole ground in Friezland. They are members of the Greater Manchester Cricket League.
- Saddleworth Rangers are an amateur rugby league club who play home matches at Greenfield.
- Saddleworth Clarion is the area's cycling club, catering for on and off-road club cycling
- Tame Valley Tennis and Squash Club (TVTSC) is located in Greenfield providing four tennis courts and three squash courts.

== See also ==
- Listed buildings in Saddleworth
