= Delph =

Village in Saddleworth, Greater Manchester, England

Coordinates: 53.568°N 2.023°W

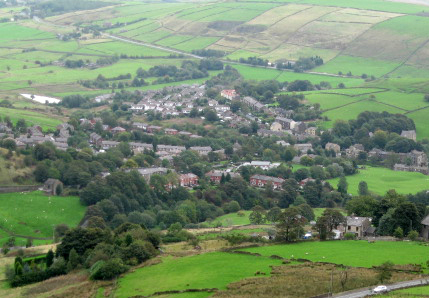
- A view of Delph

- Location within Greater Manchester
- Population: 1,899
- OS grid reference: SD984080
  - London: 164 mi (264 km) SSE
- Civil parish: Saddleworth
- Metropolitan borough: Oldham
- Metropolitan county: Greater Manchester
- Region: North West
- Country: England
- Sovereign state: United Kingdom
- Post town: OLDHAM
- Postcode district: OL3
- Dialling code: 01457
- Police: Greater Manchester
- Fire: Greater Manchester
- Ambulance: North West
- UK Parliament: Oldham East and Saddleworth

Delph (Old English (ge)delf a quarry) is a village in the civil parish of Saddleworth in the Metropolitan Borough of Oldham, in Greater Manchester, England. Historically within the West Riding of Yorkshire, it lies amongst the Pennines on the River Tame below the village of Denshaw, four miles (six kilometres) east-northeast of Oldham and 1 3/4 miles (3 km) north-northwest of Uppermill.

The centre of the village has barely changed from the 19th century, when a number of small textile mills provided employment for the local community. There is a significant first century AD Roman fort at Castleshaw.

== Culture ==
The village is home to one of the Saddleworth Whit Friday brass band contests, with in the region of seventy-five bands from across the UK and beyond marching down the main street at five-minute intervals on the evening of the contest which often continues into the early hours. In the village of Dobcross, a Henry Livings memorial prize is open to bands who play on any of the morning's walks on Whit Friday.

It is also home to the Millgate Arts Centre, the home of the Saddleworth Players. This group puts on six plays a year, as well as hosting a number of other events throughout the year.

Delph has featured in several films:

- The main street running through the centre of Delph was used in some of the external shots of the 2001 feature film The Parole Officer, starring Steve Coogan, Om Puri and Jenny Agutter.
- It was used in the filming of the Whit Friday scene in the 1996 film Brassed Off.
- The legendary landmark above Delph 'St Thomas Church at The Heights' was featured in the blockbuster movie A Monster Calls starring Liam Neeson.

Delph is mentioned in the song "This One's For Now" by the band Half Man Half Biscuit, on their 2014 album Urge for Offal.

== Transport ==
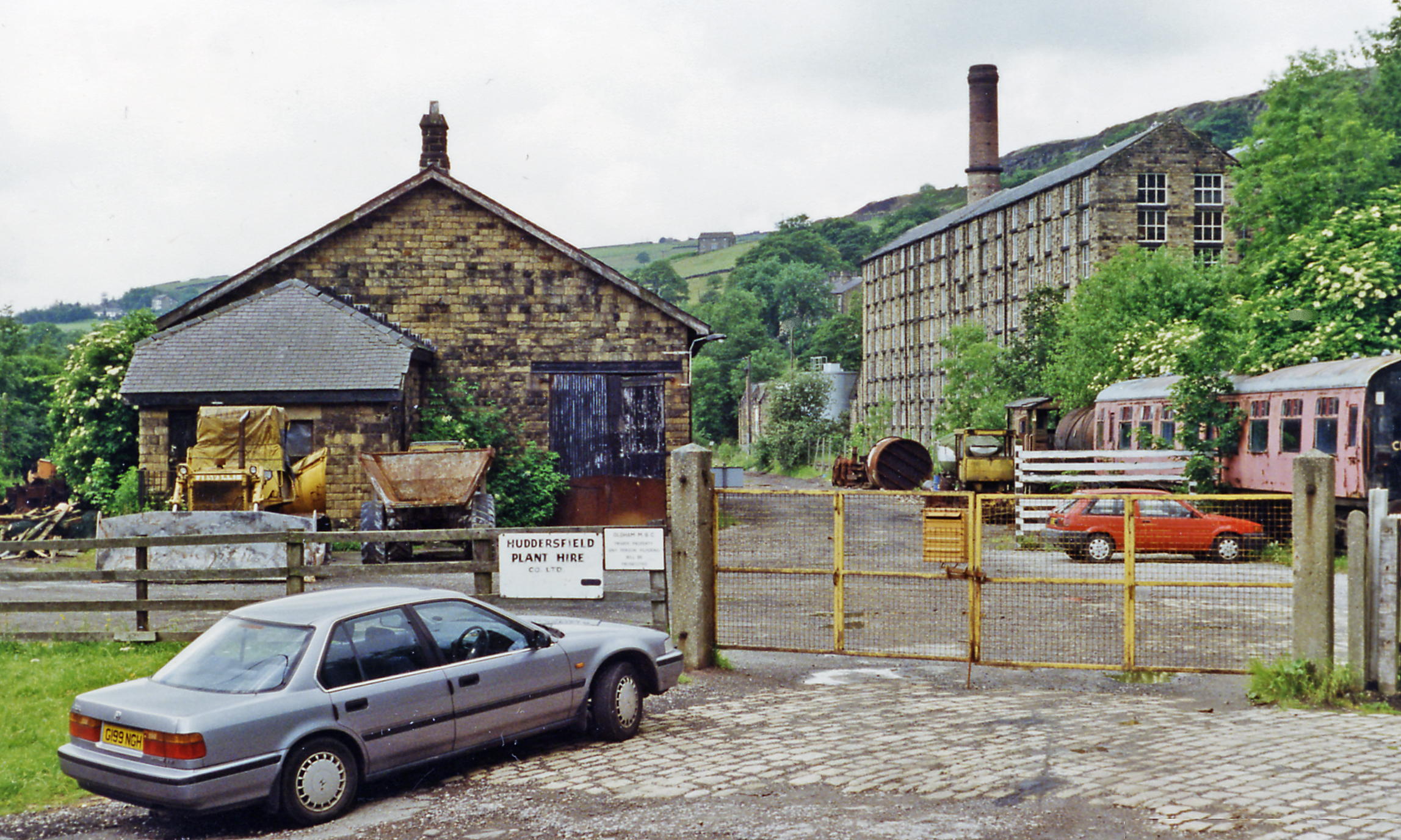
The remains of Delph station in 1996

Delph railway station was opened in 1851 as part of the London and North Western Railway route from Oldham to Delph. The station closed in May 1955, when the Delph Donkey passenger train service via Greenfield was withdrawn.

Local bus services are operated primarily by Stagecoach Manchester and Diamond North West (as part of the Bee Network). Routes run to Oldham, Ashton-Under-Lyne, Stalybridge and other parts of Saddleworth.

The A62 road runs just south of the village and was previously the main thoroughfare from Manchester and Oldham into Huddersfield and Leeds. The road now sees comparatively lower traffic levels since the opening of the M62 motorway, which passes around 5 miles north of Delph.

== Notable people ==
- Henry Livings (1929–1998), playwright and actor
- Albert Mallalieu (1904–1991), English cricketer

== See also ==
- Listed buildings in Saddleworth
