= Grasscroft =

Village in Greater Manchester, England

Coordinates: 53.537°N 2.026°W

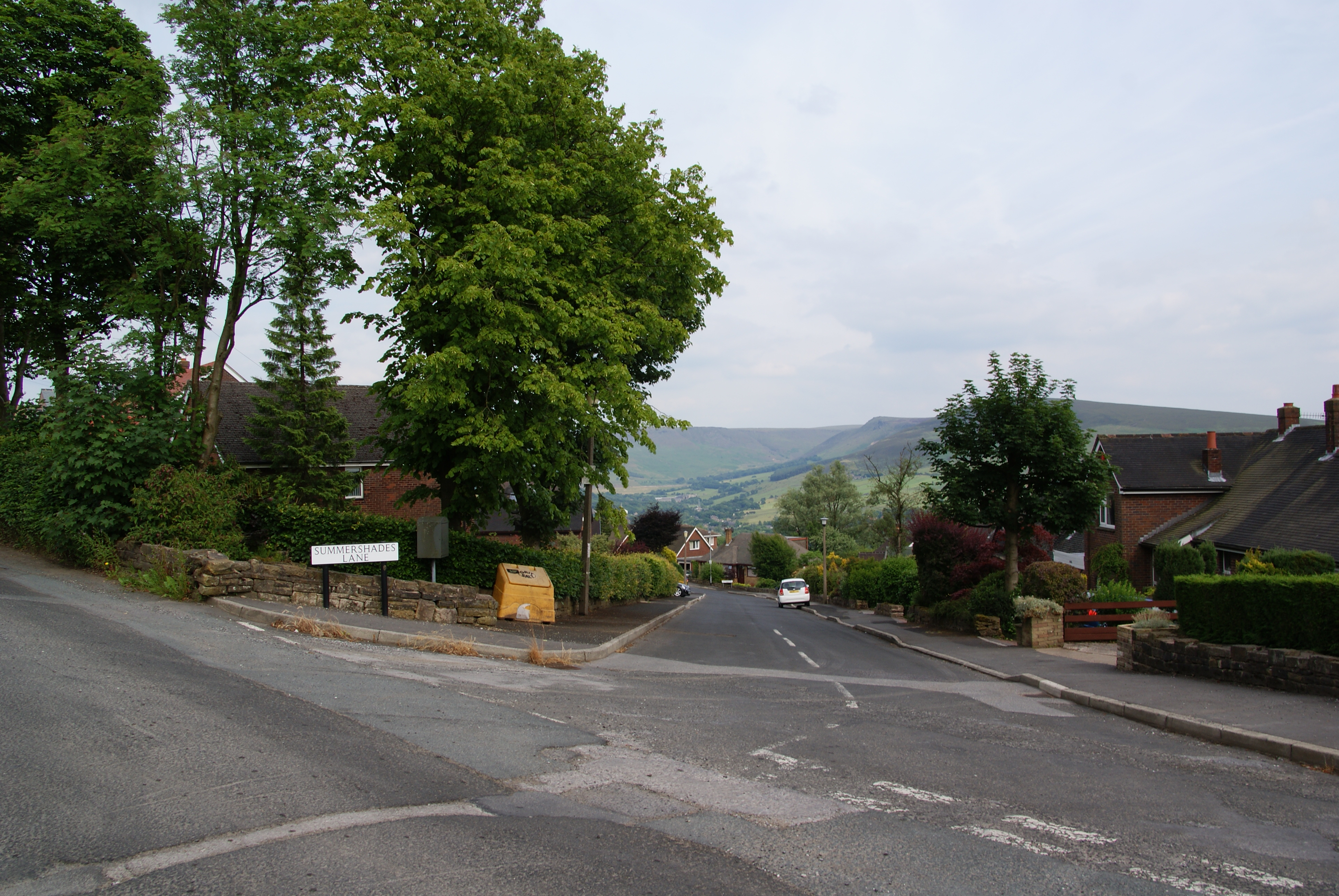
- The top of Summershades Lane, Grasscroft

- Location within Greater Manchester
- OS grid reference: SD982045
- Civil parish: Saddleworth
- Metropolitan borough: Oldham
- Metropolitan county: Greater Manchester
- Region: North West
- Country: England
- Sovereign state: United Kingdom
- Post town: OLDHAM
- Postcode district: OL4
- Dialling code: 01457
- Police: Greater Manchester
- Fire: Greater Manchester
- Ambulance: North West
- UK Parliament: Oldham East and Saddleworth

Grasscroft is a village in the civil parish of Saddleworth in the Metropolitan Borough of Oldham, in Greater Manchester, England. It is historically part of the West Riding of Yorkshire.

The village has had two notable residents - former Manchester United and England footballer Paul Scholes and physicist Brian Cox.

== See also ==
- Listed buildings in Saddleworth
- Grasscroft Halt railway station
