= Diggle, Greater Manchester =

Village in Greater Manchester, England

Coordinates: 53.568°N 1.995°W

Diggle
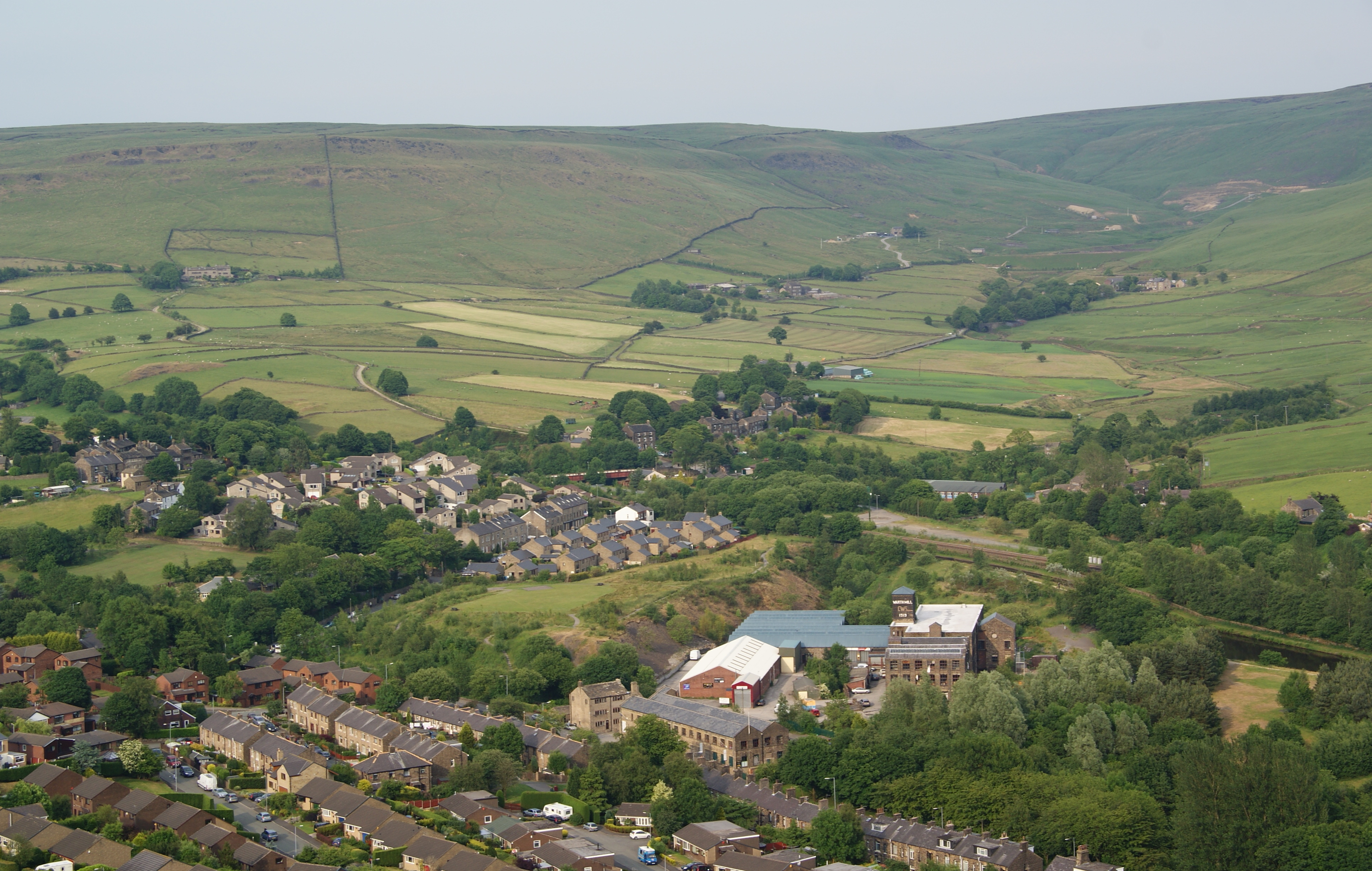
- Diggle from Harrop Edge

- Location within Greater Manchester
- OS grid reference: SE017083
- Civil parish: Saddleworth
- Metropolitan borough: Metropolitan Borough of Oldham
- Metropolitan county: Greater Manchester
- Region: North West
- Country: England
- Sovereign state: United Kingdom
- Post town: OLDHAM
- Postcode district: OL3
- Dialling code: 01457
- Police: Greater Manchester
- Fire: Greater Manchester
- Ambulance: North West
- UK Parliament: Oldham East and Saddleworth

Diggle is a village in the civil parish of Saddleworth, in the Metropolitan Borough of Oldham, Greater Manchester, England. It lies on the moorlands of the Pennine hills.

== History ==
The name Diggle comes from the Saxon word degle meaning "valley". Like many of Saddleworth's villages, it traces its history back to a collection of hamlets.

The Gate pub and a post office/off-licence is a listed building.

== Location ==
Historically part of the West Riding of Yorkshire, it is located at one end of the restored Standedge Canal Tunnel, Britain's longest, deepest and highest canal tunnel.

== Transport ==
Diggle railway station served the village between 1849 and 1968; the Huddersfield Line continues to pass through the former station site. The nearest National Rail station is now at Greenfield, where TransPennine Express provides services between Manchester Piccadilly, Huddersfield, Wakefield Kirkgate and York.

Diggle is served by two bus routes, both operated under the Bee Network brand:

- 184 is run by Stagecoach Manchester between Oldham and Huddersfield
- 356 is operated by Diamond North West, which runs between Oldham and Ashton-under-Lyne, via Denshaw, Uppermill, Greenfield, Mossley and Stalybridge.

== Sport ==
Diggle is home to Diggle F.C., an FA-registered amateur football club, which plays its home games at Churchill playing fields in Uppermill. It competes in the Huddersfield and District Association Football League.

Saddleworth Clarion Cycling Club hosts the annual Beard Cup Hill Climb out of Diggle each September.

== See also ==
- Listed buildings in Saddleworth
