= OL postcode area =

Postcode area within the United Kingdom

Oldham
- Postcode area
- Coordinates: 53.583°N 2.125°W
- Country: United Kingdom
- Postcode area: OL
- Postcode area name: Oldham
- Post towns: 7
- Postcode districts: 17
- Postcode sectors: 70
- Postcodes (live): 13,044
- Postcodes (total): 17,647
- Statistics as at May 2020

The OL postcode area, also known as the Oldham postcode area, is a group of sixteen postcode districts in north-west England, within seven post towns. These cover northeast Greater Manchester (Oldham, Rochdale, Ashton-under-Lyne, Heywood and Littleborough), and small parts of east Lancashire (Bacup) and West Yorkshire (Todmorden).

Mail for the OL postcode area is processed at Manchester Mail Centre, along with mail for the M, BL and SK postcode areas.

== Coverage ==
The approximate coverage of the postcode districts are:

Postcode district	Post town	Coverage	Local authority area(s)
OL1	OLDHAM	Chadderton, Higginshaw, Oldham	Oldham
OL2	OLDHAM	Heyside, Royton, Shaw	Oldham
OL3	OLDHAM	Delph, Denshaw, Diggle, Dobcross, Greenfield, Uppermill	Oldham
OL4	OLDHAM	Austerlands, Grasscroft, Grotton, Lees, Lydgate, Oldham, Scouthead, Springhead, Waterhead	Oldham
OL5	ASHTON-UNDER-LYNE	Mossley, Mossley Cross	Tameside
OL6	ASHTON-UNDER-LYNE	Ashton-under-Lyne (centre and east)	Tameside
OL7	ASHTON-UNDER-LYNE	Ashton-under-Lyne (west), Guide Bridge	Tameside
OL8	OLDHAM	Bardsley, Oldham	Oldham
OL9	OLDHAM	Chadderton, Oldham, Westwood, Freehold	Oldham
OL10	HEYWOOD	Heywood	Rochdale
OL11	ROCHDALE	Rochdale (south), Ashworth, Balderstone, Castleton, Norden	Rochdale
OL12	ROCHDALE	Rochdale (north), Buckley, Facit, Great Howarth, Healy, Hurstead, Shawforth, Wardle, Whitworth	Rochdale, Rossendale
OL13	BACUP	Bacup, Britannia, Stacksteads	Rossendale
OL14	TODMORDEN	Cornholme, Todmorden, Eastwood, Walsden	Calderdale
OL15	LITTLEBOROUGH	Littleborough, Shore, Smithybridge, Summit	Rochdale
OL16	LITTLEBOROUGH		non-geographic
OL16	ROCHDALE	Rochdale (east), Burnedge, Firgrove, Hurstead, Milnrow, Smallbridge, Thornham	Rochdale
OL95	OLDHAM	British Gas	non-geographic

== Map ==
OL postcode area map, showing postcode districts in red and post towns in grey text, with links to nearby BB, BL, HD, HX, M and SK postcode areas.

== See also ==
- Postcode Address File
- List of postcode areas in the United Kingdom
