= Oldham East and Saddleworth =

UK Parliament constituency (since 1997)

Coordinates: 53°36′N 2°06′W

- County constituency for the House of Commons
- Interactive map of boundaries since 2010
- Location within North West England
- County: Greater Manchester
- Electorate: 72,997 (March 2020)
- Major settlements: Oldham (part); Saddleworth; Shaw and Crompton

Current constituency
- Created: 1997
- Member of Parliament: Debbie Abrahams (Labour)
- Seats: One
- Created from: Littleborough and Saddleworth and Oldham Central and Royton

Oldham East and Saddleworth is a constituency in outer Greater Manchester represented in the House of Commons of the UK Parliament since January 2011 by Debbie Abrahams of the Labour Party.

== Constituency profile ==
Oldham East and Saddleworth is a constituency in Greater Manchester in North West England. It covers the eastern half of the town of Oldham (including the neighbourhoods of Glodwick, Abbey Hills, Derker and Waterhead), the outer residential areas of Lees, Moorside, Sholver, Shaw and Crompton, and the parish of Saddleworth which includes the connected villages of Springhead, Grasscroft, Greenfield, Uppermill, Dobcross, Delph and Diggle.

Oldham is a large town that was traditionally reliant on the textile trade, especially cotton spinning. It grew rapidly as a mill town during the Victorian era, and in the early 20th century the town hosted more than one-tenth of the world's operational cotton-spinning machines. Oldham also has a history of coal mining; however, neither industry survived into the 21st century. Dense terraced housing, built to house factory workers, is typical of the town's central neighbourhoods. Saddleworth is a mostly rural area at the foot of the Pennine hills; its villages also had textile-based economies.

As with much of industrial Northern England, the decline of the textile and coal industries in the late 20th century left the area highly deprived; most of eastern Oldham falls within the top 10% most deprived areas in England. Lees, Shaw and Crompton are wealthier and more suburban in character, while rural Saddleworth is mostly affluent. House prices across the constituency are generally lower than the regional and UK averages. For the constituency's 2011 by-election, The Guardian commented on the diversity in the area by describing it as a "shotgun marriage [...] Coronation Street meets Last of the Summer Wine".

Dove Stone Reservoir, in the more rural Saddleworth area of the constituency.

Residents of Oldham East and Saddleworth have a similar age profile to the rest of the country. They have below-average levels of income and average rates of homeownership. The child poverty rate is nearly double the UK-wide figure. Residents have low levels of education and a high proportion work in the manufacturing sector. The percentage claiming unemployment benefits is high. White people made up 72% of the population at the 2021 census. Asians, mostly of Pakistani origin, were the largest ethnic minority group at 21%. The Asian community was concentrated close to the town centre around Glodwick where they made up around three-quarters of the population, while the areas outside the town centre were over 90% White.

At the local borough council, the dense urban areas are represented by Labour Party, Workers Party and independent councillors. The outer suburbs elected Conservative and Reform UK representatives and Saddleworth elected Conservatives and Liberal Democrats. An estimated 59% of voters in Oldham East and Saddleworth supported leaving the European Union in the 2016 referendum, higher than the UK-wide figure of 52%.

== History ==
The seat was established for the 1997 general election from parts of the former Littleborough and Saddleworth and Oldham Central and Royton constituencies. Oldham Central and Royton was a safe Labour seat whereas Littleborough and Saddleworth had had a Conservative MP, Geoffrey Dickens, from its creation until a 1995 close three-party fought by-election where it was lost to a Liberal Democrat. Ahead of the 1997 general election the new seat was notionally Conservative, though from 1997 to 2011 the seat was a Labour/Liberal Democrat marginal; (Note: The phrase comes from the estimated size of the winner's majority.) Phil Woolas of the Labour Party (defeated candidate in the 1995 by-election) was victorious in all four general elections in that period, but his majorities were not substantial and the Conservative vote increased from 16% to 24%.

At the 2001 general election, the far-right British National Party gained over 5,000 votes (an 11.2% share), retaining their deposit partly as Nick Griffin stood in the neighbouring West seat. Along with the BNP's showing in the neighbouring Oldham West and Royton constituency, this was interpreted as a reaction to the 2001 Oldham riots. At the 2005 election the BNP's share of the vote dropped to 4.9%.

For the 2010 general election the seat lost the Milnrow and Newhey ward to the neighbouring Rochdale constituency and gained part of Alexandra ward from Oldham West and Royton.

After losing the 2010 general election by 103 votes, Liberal Democrat candidate Elwyn Watkins submitted a petition for a hearing by an election court, claiming that campaign literature issued by his Labour opponent Phil Woolas breached the Representation of the People Act 1983 by making false statements about his personal character. On 5 November 2010, the election court (Note: Determined by High Court of England and Wales Judges Mr Justice Nigel Teare and Mr Justice Griffith Williams) upheld the petition and declared the election void after reporting Phil Woolas guilty of making false election statements. Woolas sought a judicial review of the decision in the Administrative Division of the High Court, which upheld the decision of the Election Court in relation to two statements, whilst quashing the decision in relation to a third. As a result, the 2011 Oldham East and Saddleworth by-election was needed. By the time it was held, the Liberal Democrats had supported an increase in tuition fees, despite a manifesto commitment to oppose any such increase. This caused a significant drop in their polling numbers nationally, but one media report nevertheless stated the seat was "ultra-marginal between Labour and the Liberal Democrats". The by-election took place on 13 January 2011 and was contested by ten candidates. The Labour Party candidate Debbie Abrahams won, and held the seat in subsequent general elections.

== Boundaries ==
1997–2010: The Metropolitan Borough of Oldham wards of Crompton, Lees, St James', St Mary's, Saddleworth East, Saddleworth West, Shaw, and Waterhead, and the Metropolitan Borough of Rochdale ward of Milnrow.

2010–present: The Metropolitan Borough of Oldham wards of Alexandra, Crompton, St James', St Mary's, Saddleworth North, Saddleworth South, Saddleworth West and Lees, Shaw, and Waterhead.

The 2023 review of Westminster constituencies, which was based on the ward structure in place at 1 December 2020, left the boundaries unchanged.

== Members of Parliament ==
Election	Member	Party	Notes
1997	Phil Woolas	Labour	
2011 by-election	Debbie Abrahams	Labour	Shadow Secretary of State for Work and Pensions (2016-2018)

== Elections ==
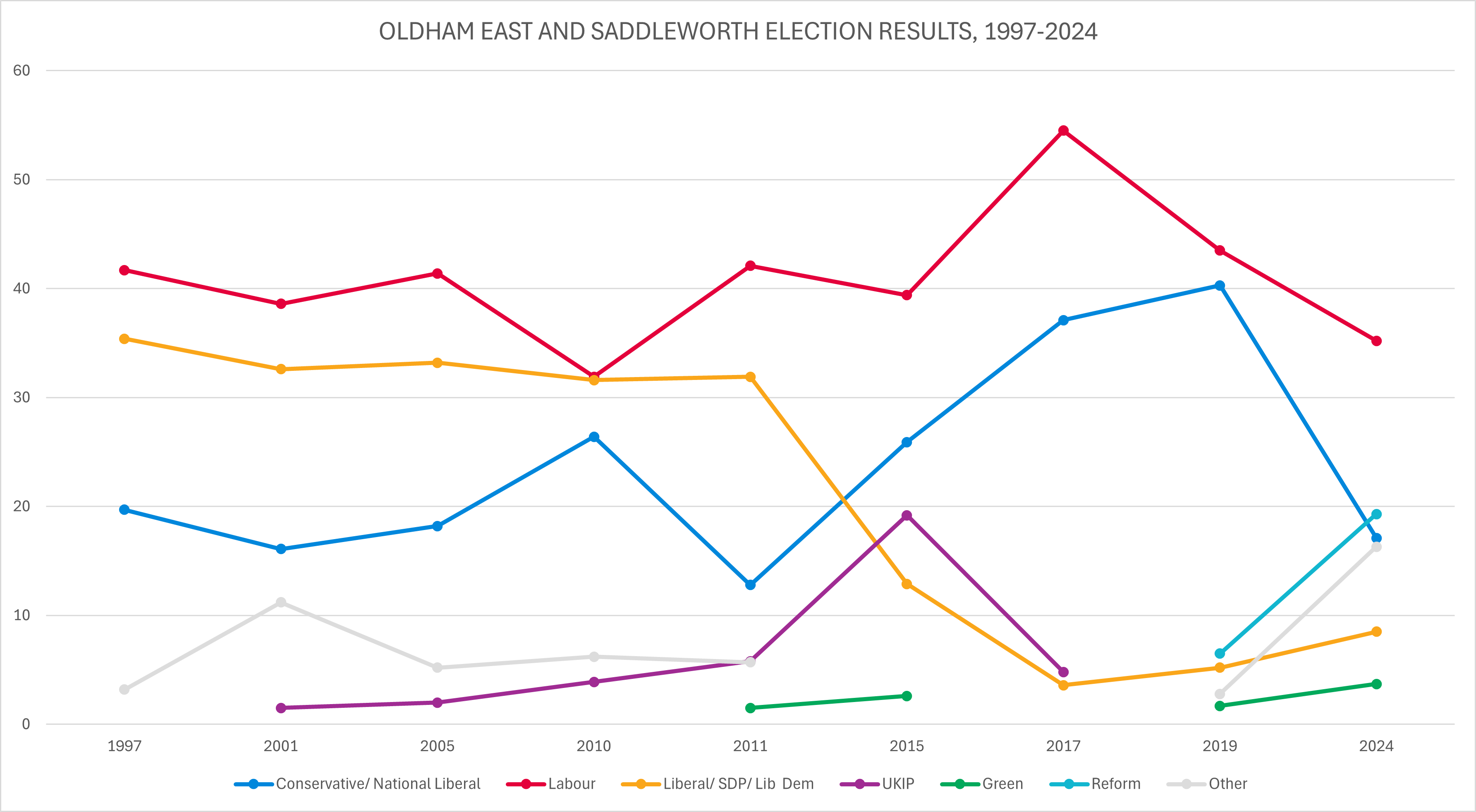
Election results 1983-2024

=== Elections in the 2020s ===
General election 2024: Oldham East and Saddleworth
Party	Candidate	Votes	%	±%
Labour	Debbie Abrahams	14,091	35.2	−8.3
Reform	Jacob Barden	7,734	19.3	+12.8
Conservative	Tom Fish	6,838	17.1	−23.2
Workers Party	Shanaz Saddique	4,647	11.6	N/A
Liberal Democrats	Sam Al-Hamdani	3,386	8.5	+3.3
Green	Fesl Reza-Khan	1,490	3.7	+2.0
Independent	Paul Errock	1,362	3.4	N/A
Independent	Nick Buckley	517	1.3	N/A
Majority		6,357	15.9	+12.7
Turnout		40,065	54.8	−8.9
Registered electors		72,760		
Labour hold		Swing	-10.6	

=== Elections in the 2010s ===
General election 2019: Oldham East and Saddleworth
Party	Candidate	Votes	%	±%
Labour	Debbie Abrahams	20,088	43.5	−11.0
Conservative	Tom Lord	18,589	40.3	+3.2
Brexit Party	Paul Brierley	2,980	6.5	N/A
Liberal Democrats	Sam Al-Hamdani	2,423	5.2	+1.6
Proud of Oldham and Saddleworth	Paul Errock	1,073	2.3	N/A
Green	Wendy Olsen	778	1.7	N/A
Independent	Amoy Lindo	233	0.5	N/A
Majority		1,503	3.2	−14.2
Turnout		46,164	64.0	−1.3
Labour hold		Swing	-7.1	

General election 2017: Oldham East and Saddleworth
Party	Candidate	Votes	%	±%
Labour	Debbie Abrahams	25,629	54.5	+15.1
Conservative	Kashif Ali	17,447	37.1	+11.2
UKIP	Ian Bond	2,278	4.8	−14.4
Liberal Democrats	Jonathan Smith	1,683	3.6	−9.3
Majority		8,182	17.4	+3.9
Turnout		47,037	65.3	+3.5
Labour hold		Swing	+2.0	

General election 2015: Oldham East and Saddleworth
Party	Candidate	Votes	%	±%
Labour	Debbie Abrahams	17,529	39.4	+7.5
Conservative	Sajjad Hussain	11,527	25.9	−0.5
UKIP	Peter Klonowski	8,557	19.2	+15.3
Liberal Democrats	Richard Marbrow	5,718	12.9	−18.7
Green	Miranda Meadowcroft	1,152	2.6	N/A
Majority		6,002	13.5	+13.2
Turnout		44,483	61.8	+0.6
Labour hold		Swing	+4.0	

By-election 2011: Oldham East and Saddleworth
Party	Candidate	Votes	%	±%
Labour	Debbie Abrahams	14,718	42.1	+10.2
Liberal Democrats	Elwyn Watkins	11,160	31.9	+0.3
Conservative	Kashif Ali	4,481	12.8	−13.6
UKIP	Paul Nuttall	2,029	5.8	+1.9
BNP	Derek Adams	1,560	4.5	−1.2
Green	Peter Allen	530	1.5	N/A
Monster Raving Loony	Nick "The Flying Brick" Delves	145	0.4	N/A
English Democrat	Stephen Morris	144	0.4	N/A
Pirate	Loz Kaye	96	0.3	N/A
Bus-Pass Elvis	David Bishop	67	0.1	N/A
Majority		3,558	10.2	+9.9
Turnout		34,930	48.0	−13.2
Labour hold		Swing	+4.95	

General election 2010: Oldham East and Saddleworth
Party	Candidate	Votes	%	±%
Labour	Phil Woolas	14,186	31.9	−10.7
Liberal Democrats	Elwyn Watkins	14,083	31.6	−0.5
Conservative	Kashif Ali	11,773	26.4	+8.7
BNP	Alwyn Stott	2,546	5.7	+0.8
UKIP	David Bentley	1,720	3.9	+1.8
Christian	Gulzar Nazir	212	0.5	N/A
Majority		103	0.3	−10.1
Turnout		44,520	61.2	+4.4
Void election result		Swing	−5.1	

=== Elections in the 2000s ===
General election 2005: Oldham East and Saddleworth
Party	Candidate	Votes	%	±%
Labour	Phil Woolas	17,968	41.4	+2.8
Liberal Democrats	Tony Dawson	14,378	33.2	+0.6
Conservative	Keith Chapman	7,901	18.2	+2.1
BNP	Michael Treacy	2,109	4.9	−6.3
UKIP	Valerie Nield	873	2.0	+0.5
Independent	Philip O'Grady	138	0.3	N/A
Majority		3,590	8.2	+2.2
Turnout		43,367	57.3	−3.7
Labour hold		Swing	+1.1	

General election 2001: Oldham East and Saddleworth
Party	Candidate	Votes	%	±%
Labour	Phil Woolas	17,537	38.6	−3.1
Liberal Democrats	Howard Sykes	14,811	32.6	−2.8
Conservative	Craig Heeley	7,304	16.1	−3.6
BNP	Michael Treacy	5,091	11.2	N/A
UKIP	Barbara Little	677	1.5	N/A
Majority		2,726	6.0	−0.3
Turnout		45,420	61.0	−12.9
Labour hold		Swing	+0.13	

=== Elections in the 1990s ===
General election 1997: Oldham East and Saddleworth
Party	Candidate	Votes	%	±%
Labour	Phil Woolas	22,546	41.7	+11.5
Liberal Democrats	Chris Davies	19,157	35.4	+1.0
Conservative	John Hudson	10,666	19.7	−15.7
Referendum	Douglas Findlay	1,116	2.0	
Socialist Labour	John Smith	470	0.9	
Natural Law	Ian Dalling	146	0.3	
Majority		3,389	6.3	
Turnout		54,101	73.92	
Labour win (new seat)				

Chris Davies was MP for the former Littleborough and Saddleworth seat since the 1995 by-election.

== See also ==
- Parliamentary constituencies in Greater Manchester
