= Uppermill =

Village in Greater Manchester, England

Coordinates: 53.549°N 2.004°W

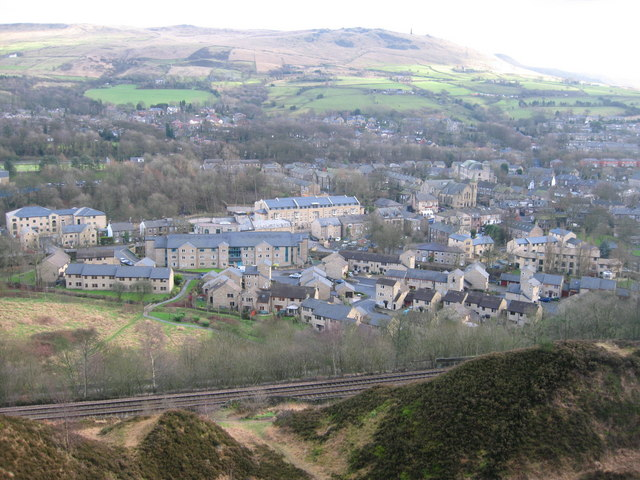
- View over Uppermill

- Location within Greater Manchester
- OS grid reference: SD938090
  - London: 161 miles (261 km) SSE
- Civil parish: Saddleworth
- Metropolitan borough: Oldham
- Metropolitan county: Greater Manchester
- Region: North West
- Country: England
- Sovereign state: United Kingdom
- Post town: OLDHAM
- Postcode district: OL3
- Dialling code: 01457
- Police: Greater Manchester
- Fire: Greater Manchester
- Ambulance: North West
- UK Parliament: Oldham East and Saddleworth

Uppermill is a village in the civil parish of Saddleworth in the Metropolitan Borough of Oldham, Greater Manchester, England. Historically in the West Riding of Yorkshire, it lies on the River Tame in a valley amongst the South Pennines with the Peak District National Park directly to the east, 5 miles (8.0 km) east of Oldham and 11 miles (17.7 km) northeast of Manchester. Uppermill and the neighbouring village of Dobcross have a combined population of 7,500.

== History ==
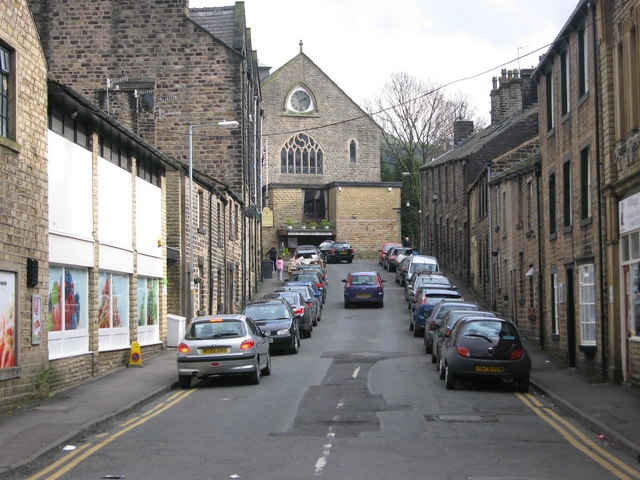
Uppermill Civic Hall (in the centre of the picture)

Although there is evidence of Roman activity in the area, the history of Uppermill is dominated by the expansion of wool and cotton spinning into the area during the Industrial Revolution, with the construction of several mills. Uppermill Civic Hall was completed in 1859.

From 1894 to 1900 Upper Mill was an urban district. In 1894 Upper Mill became a civil parish, being formed from the part of Saddleworth in Upper Mill Urban District, on 1 April 1900 the parish was abolished and merged with Saddleworth.

== Demography ==
Dobcross/Uppermill compared
| 2001 UK census | Dobcross/Uppermill | Oldham (borough) | England |
|---|---|---|---|
| Total population | 7,475 | 217,273 | 49,138,831 |
| White | 98.3% | 86.1 | 91% |
| Asian | 0.6% | 11.9 | 4.6% |
| Black | 0.2% | 0.6 | 2.3% |

The villages of Uppermill and Dobcross were treated as a single entity by the Office for National Statistics in the 2001 United Kingdom Census. As such, there are no demographic statistics for the village on its own. The statistics given here are for the combined population of Uppermill and Dobcross, which are about half a mile apart.

At the 2001 census, the area had a population of 7,475. Its population density was 10,324 inhabitants per square mile (3,986/km^{2}), with a 100 to 92.6 female-to-male ratio. Of those over 16 years old, 22.5% were single (never married), 49.6% married, and 7.8% divorced. The 3,225 households in the area included 27.7% one-person, 43.2% married couples living together, 8.1% were co-habiting couples, and 6.9% single parents with their children. Of those aged 16–74, 21.1% had no academic qualifications, significantly below the averages of Oldham (37.7%) and England (28.9%).

At the 2001 UK census, 79.6% of residents in the area reported themselves as being Christian, 0.3% Muslim, 0.3% Hindu, 0.2% Buddhist and 0.2% Jewish. The census recorded 13.3% as having no religion, 0.2% had an alternative religion and 6.0% did not state their religion.

== Transport ==
The nearest railway station to Uppermill is Greenfield with an hourly service provided in both directions by TransPennine Express between Manchester Piccadilly and Huddersfield.

Bus services through the village provided by Stagecoach Manchester (Bee Network) operate to Oldham and Piccadilly Gardens and Ashton-under-Lyne. South Pennine Community Transport provide a service to Holmfirth. Diamond North West provide a service between Oldham, Greenfield station and Ashton-under-Lyne.
