= Listed buildings in Saddleworth to 1800 =

Saddleworth is a civil parish in the Metropolitan Borough of Oldham, Greater Manchester, England. It lies between the town of Oldham and the Pennine hills, and it is largely rural, with agricultural land and moorland. It also includes suburban areas to the east of Oldham. The principal settlements are Austerlands, Delph, Denshaw, Diggle, Dobcross, Grasscroft, Greenfield, Grotton, Lydgate, Springhead, and Uppermill. The parish contains 385 listed buildings that are recorded in the National Heritage List for England. Of these, five are listed at Grade II*, the middle grade, and the others are at Grade II, the lowest grade.

Most of the listed buildings are houses and farmhouses, and many have been used as loom workshops and have windows with multiple lights. Almost all the buildings are in stone and have roofs of stone-slate or slate, and the windows are mullioned. The Huddersfield Narrow Canal runs through the parish, and the listed buildings associated with this are bridges, locks, a milestone, and an aqueduct. The other listed buildings include farm buildings, churches and associated structures, village stocks, public houses, bridges, shops, a former mill, milestones, a boundary stone, tenter posts, a railway viaduct, two war memorials, and three telephone kiosks.

This list contains the listed buildings dated up to 1800.

== Key ==
Grade	Criteria
II*	Particularly important buildings of more than special interest
II	Buildings of national importance and special interest

== Buildings ==
Name and location	Photograph	Date	Notes	Grade
Heys Cottage and The Cottage, Delph; 53.56849°N 2.03612°W	—	1616	The Cottage is the earlier, although most of it now dates from the 18th century, and Heys Cottage is dated 1759. The cottages are in stone with stone-slate roofs, each has two storeys, and they are built back-to-back, forming two parallel ranges. Heys Cottage is one bay wide, and has a later wing and a 20th-century porch. The cottage also has a later porch, and both cottages have mullioned windows.	II
Pinfold Farmhouse, Uppermill; 53.54220°N 1.99382°W		Early 17th century	The farmhouse was much altered and extended in the 18th century. It is in stone and has a stone-slate roof with coped gables, a single-depth plan, three storeys, three bays, and lean-to extensions to both sides. The windows are mullioned, one has a hood mould, others have ten and 13 lights, and there are two blocked taking-in doors.	II
Boots Cottage, Uppermill; 53.55294°N 1.98992°W	—	1633	A house with a barn added to the left, later used for other purposes, it is in stone with quoins and a stone-slate roof. The house has a single-depth plan, two storeys and two bays. Above the doorway is a dated lintel, two garage doors have been inserted, and the windows are mullioned. The barn has a cart entry with a massive stone lintel, a doorway, a winnowing door at the rear, and the remains of mullioned windows.	II
The Old Vicarage and Barn, Uppermill; 53.54973°N 1.99213°W	—	Early to mid-17th century	The house and barn are in millstone grit with a stone-slate roof. The house was extended to the south in the later 17th century and the barn was added in the 18th century. The house is on a projecting plinth, and has quoins, a single-depth plan, two storeys, and five bays. The doorways have chamfered surrounds, and the windows are mullioned. The barn has a central cart entry with chamfered monolithic jambs, and two blocked shippon doors, and at the rear is a blocked winnowing door.	II
Fur Lane Farmhouse and Cottage, Greenfield; 53.53956°N 1.99952°W	—	1645 (probable)	The farmhouse and cottage date mainly from the 18th and early 19th centuries. They are in stone and have stone-slate roofs with coped gables. Each building has three storeys and two bays, and they form an L-shaped plan. The cottage has a single-depth plan, quoins, and shaped eaves gutter brackets, and the farmhouse has a double-depth plan. All the windows are mullioned, and include a 13-light workshop window.	II
Windy Nook, Grotton; 53.53326°N 2.05025°W	—	1648	A house with a cottage added later, in stone on a projecting plinth with quoins and a stone-slate roof. There are two storeys, the house has two bays, and the cottage has one, with a lean-to extension on the cottage. The doorway has a chamfered surround, and the windows are mullioned.	II
1 Millcroft Lane, Delph; 53.57771°N 2.02078°W	—	Mid-17th century	The house, which was much altered in the 18th century, is in stone with quoins and a stone-slate roof. There are two storeys, three bays, and a later rear outshut. The windows are mullioned, including a seven-light window on the upper floor.	II
2 Millcroft Lane, Delph; 53.57761°N 2.02062°W	—	Mid-17th century	The house, which was later altered, is in stone with quoins and a stone-slate roof. There are two storeys, two bays on the front and four at the rear. Most of the windows are mullioned, and some have arched heads. Inside there is a full-height wattle and daub timber-framed partition with an ogee-shaped door lintel.	II
Cottage and barn, Grotton Hall, Lydgate; 53.54009°N 2.04334°W	—	1656 (possible)	The barn is the older, the cottage dating from the 18th century. They are in stone, the barn with a slate roof, and the cottage with a roof of stone-slate. The cottage has an eaves cornice, coped gables, one with a finial, a double-depth plan, two storeys, a doorway with a chamfered surround, and mullioned windows. The barn has a projecting plinth, quoins, two tiers of ventilation slits, a cart entry, and a blocked doorway with one chamfered jamb.	II
Manor House, Austerlands; 53.54200°N 2.05410°W	—	Mid- to late 17th century	A stone house on a projecting plinth with quoins and a stone-slate roof. It has two storeys, two bays, and a gabled wing to the right. The windows on the upper floor on the front date from the 20th century, and the other windows are mullioned with hood moulds.	II
7 Tame Lane, Delph; 53.57928°N 2.04052°W	—	Late 17th century	Two stone houses with a stone-slate roof, the later house dated 1742, that were later combined into one house, the earlier part forming a gabled wing at right angles to the later part. Both parts have two storeys and two bays each. The earlier part has a projecting plinth, quoins, and a doorway with a square head. The later part has a former doorway with a chamfered surround converted into a window. At the rear are two doorways, one with a chamfered basket-headed lintel, and the other with a recessed spandrel lintel. The windows in both parts are mullioned.	II
Lower Cottage, Dobcross; 53.55522°N 2.01128°W	—	Late 17th century	The house was extended in 1742. It is in stone with a stone-slate roof, a single-depth plan, two storeys, and three bays. The doorway has a square head, most of the windows are mullioned, including a seven-light and a nine-light window, and at the rear are 20th-century replacements.	II
Peter's Farmhouse, Uppermill; 53.55224°N 1.98935°W		Late 17th century	A farmhouse, later a private house, with later alterations and extensions, it is in stone with quoins and has a stone-slate roof with coped gables. There is a single-depth plan, two storeys, and seven bays, the seventh bay being a flat-roofed 20th-century addition. On the front are three 20th-century porches, and the windows are mullioned.	II
Woolleys Hill Cottage, Greenfield; 53.52823°N 2.01141°W		Late 17th century	A stone house on a projecting plinth, with quoins and a stone-slate roof. It has a single-depth plan, two storeys, two bays, and a 20th-century porch on the right gable end. The doorway has a square head, and the windows are mullioned.	II
Grotton Head Farmhouse and barn, Lydgate; 53.53996°N 2.04357°W	—	1678	The barn is the older, the farmhouse dated 1845, both in stone, the barn with a slate roof, and the house with a roof of stone-slate. The house has a double-depth plan with two storeys. It has a central doorway with a chamfered surround, a fanlight and a re-used lintel, the windows are mullioned, and the gables are coped. The barn has a projecting plinth, quoins, cart entries, outshuts, two doors with chamfered surrounds, one with a dated lintel, and three tiers of ventilation slits.	II
Grotton Hall, Lydgate; 53.54037°N 2.04381°W	—	1686	A country house that was restored in 1844 and extended in 1984. It is in stone on a projecting plinth, and has a stone-slate roof with coped gables and ball finials. There are two storeys, five bays, a one-bay extension, and a lean-to rear extension. The porch has a moulded surround, a dated lintel, constellations, and ball finials. The windows are mullioned with hood moulds, and there are circular windows in the gables.	II*
7 and 9 Stone Breaks Road, Austerlands; 53.54227°N 2.05427°W	—	1687	Two stone houses that were later altered and extended. They are on a projecting plinth, with quoins and a stone-slate roof. There are two storeys, two bays, and a rear wing. The central doorway has a chamfered surround and an initialled and dated lintel. The windows are mullioned.	II
Rose Cottage No. 1, Rose Cottage, Hill View Cottage and Old Well Cottage; 53.53764°N 1.99443°W	—	1687	A group of four stone cottages with stone-slate roofs, and dating mainly from the mid and late 18th century. They have two storeys, single and double depth plans, and mullioned windows. One cottage has a 20th-century porch, one has quoins, and one has a pebbledashed gable.	II
Barn, Fairbanks Farm, Diggle; 53.56368°N 1.98929°W	—	1689	The barn and shippon, which date from the early 18th century, incorporate an earlier house at the east end. They are in stone with quoins and a corrugated metal roof, and there is a parallel range to the rear. The two-storey two-bay house contains mullioned windows. The barn has a doorway, two hay doors, a loft hatch, and a small pigeon-cote, and there is a lean-to extension on the left.	II
Village stocks, Uppermill; 53.55415°N 1.99002°W		1698	The stocks are outside St Chad's Church, and consist of two stone posts with replaced timber foot restraints. The posts have cylindrical heads, they are carved with concentric circles, and are dated.	II
2 Saddleworth Fold, Uppermill; 53.55106°N 1.99607°W	—	1699	Originally a house and a cottage, later combined into one house, it is in stone on a projecting plinth, with quoins, and a stone-slate roof. There are two storeys, two bays, a cottage to the left, a two-storey rear wing, and a 20th-century porch. The windows are mullioned.	II
Hollins Cottage, Greenfield; 53.53320°N 1.99244°W	—	Late 17th to early 18th century	A stone house, extended in the 20th-century, with quoins and a stone-slate roof. It has two storeys and four bays, and 20th-century extensions on the front, rear, and left. On the front is a 20th-century porch, and the windows are mullioned.	II
Higher Grange Farmhouse, Delph; 53.57766°N 2.02218°W	—	1701	The farmhouse is in stone on a projecting plinth with quoins and a stone-slate roof. There are two storeys and three bays. The doorway has a dated and initialled lintel, and there is another doorway to the right with a chamfered surround. The windows are mullioned.	II
Castle Hill Cote, Diggle; 53.58156°N 2.00714°W	—	1715	A stone house on a projecting plinth with a slate roof. There are two storeys, two bays, and a lean-to extension at the rear. Above the door is a dated and initialled lintel, and the windows have moulded surrounds.	II
Fur Lane House, Greenfield; 53.53920°N 1.99845°W	—	1715	Originally a two-bay single-depth house, it was extended in 1750 giving an L-shaped plan, and the angle was infilled in the 19th century with a loomshop and coach house. The house is in stone and has a stone-slate roof with coped gables. There are two storeys, a front of four bays, a doorway with a moulded surround, a dated lintel, a cornice, and mullioned windows. At the rear, the coach house is on the ground floor, and the former loomshop above has a nine-light workshop window.	II
16, 16A and 16B Clough Lane, Grasscroft; 53.53788°N 2.03294°W	—	1717	Three stone cottages with quoins, an eaves cornice, and a stone-slate roof. There is a single-depth plan, two storeys, three bays, a right wing, and an addition in the angle. The doorway on the front has a chamfered surround, and the windows are mullioned.	II
37 Huddersfield Road, Denshaw; 53.59073°N 2.03565°W	—	1718	A stone house with quoins and a stone-slate roof with coped gables, the front dating from the 18th century. It has a single-bay plan, two storeys, three bays, and later extension to the rear. The windows are mullioned.	II
Upper and Lower Gate Head, Delph; 53.56113°N 2.02059°W	—	1718	Originally a farmhouse, later two private houses, it is in stone with a stone-slate roof. There are two storeys, two bays, a wing to the left at the rear, and a 20th-century extension on the right. The windows are mullioned, and above the doorway in the gable end is an initialled and dated lintel.	II
Thurston Clough Farmhouse, Delph; 53.56094°N 2.03680°W	—	1720	The farmhouse was largely rebuilt in the late 18th century. It is in stone with quoins, a modillion eaves cornice, and a stone-slate roof. There is a double-depth plan, three storeys and three bays. Above the central doorway is a four-light fanlight, the windows are mullioned, and there is a blocked taking-in door.	II
Gatehead Cottage, Delph; 53.56132°N 2.02109°W	—	c. 1720 (probable)	A stone house with a stone-slate roof, two storeys and two bays. The doorway has a square head, the windows are mullioned, and there is a blocked taking-in door in the gable end.	II
Thurstons, Diggle; 53.57641°N 1.98896°W	—	c. 1720	A stone house with quoins and a stone-slate roof. It has a single-depth plan, two storeys, two bays, a garage to the left, and a lean-to porch to the right. The windows are mullioned.	II
Yew Tree Farmhouse, Diggle; 53.57353°N 1.99408°W	—	c. 1720	A stone house with a stone-slate roof that was later extended. It has two storeys, the original part has two bays, with one bay added later at each end. The original part has quoins and a lean-to conservatory, and the left bay has a lean-to extension on its gable end. The windows on the front are mullioned. and at the rear some are mullioned, and others are later.	II
Boothstead, Denshaw; 53.59451°N 2.04705°W	—	1724	A stone house with quoins, a stone-slate roof, two storeys, and two bays. The windows on the front are mullioned, and at the rear are 20th-century windows. In the right gable end is a 20th-century porch with a re-sited dated and initialled lintel.	II
7, 8 and 18 Harrop Green, Diggle; 53.57009°N 1.99274°W	—	Early 18th century	A row of three stone houses, some later, with a stone-slate roof, quoins, three storeys, three bays, and a rear outshut containing the entrance to No. 18 and a dormer window. On the front are square-headed doorways, and the windows are mullioned.	II
7, 9 and 11 Clough Lane, Grasscroft; 53.53807°N 2.03302°W	—	Early 18th century	A row of three stone cottages with quoins, a stone-slate roof, and an L-shaped plan. They have two storeys, three bays, and a wing to the rear of the right bay. On the front is a 20th-century porch, and the windows are mullioned.	II
15 Harrop Green, Diggle; 53.57028°N 1.99252°W	—	Early 18th century	A stone house on a projecting plinth with quoins and a stone-slate roof. Originally with a single-depth plan, a rear range was added in the 19th century, and there are two bays. The doorway has a square head, and the windows are mullioned.	II
Dumfries Farmhouse, Denshaw; 53.59429°N 2.03934°W	—	Early 18th century	A stone farmhouse with quoins and a stone-slate roof. There are two storeys and two bays. On the front is a 20th-century porch and a square-headed doorway, and the windows are mullioned.	II
Hawk Yard, Greenfield; 53.53553°N 1.98877°W	—	Early 18th century	The house was extended in the late 18th century, and altered in the 20th century. It is in stone with quoins, a slate roof, and has two and three storeys, two bays, a lean-to extension on the right, and a 20th-century porch on the left. The windows are mullioned, and there are no windows on the rear.	II
Higher Castleshaw Farmhouse, Diggle; 53.58183°N 1.99845°W	—	Early 18th century	The farmhouse is in stone with quoins and a stone-slate roof with coped gables. There are two storeys, three bays, and two later wings at the rear. The central doorway has impost blocks, and the windows are mullioned.	II
Higher Tunstead, Greenfield; 53.53797°N 1.99456°W	—	Early 18th century	A stone house with quoins and a stone-slate roof. It has two storeys, two bays, and entrances in the gable ends. The windows are mullioned, there is a 20th-century porch in the right gable, and a blocked doorway in the left gable.	II
Oak Dene Farmhouse, Diggle; 53.58194°N 1.98842°W	—	Early 18th century	The farmhouse is in stone with a slate roof. It has a single-depth plan, two storeys, two bays, and a 20th-century bay and garage added to the right. On the front is a 20th-century porch, and the windows are mullioned, including an eleven-light window on the upper floor.	II
Raid House, Diggle; 53.56879°N 1.98812°W	—	Early 18th century	A stone house with quoins and a stone-slate roof. It has a single-depth plan, three storeys and two bays. On the front is a timber porch, a blocked taking-in door, and a 13-light mullioned workshop window. There are more mullioned windows at the rear, including one with 17 lights.	II
The Farmhouse and The Cottage, Greenfield; 53.53638°N 2.00091°W	—	Early 18th century	Most of the building was added in phases up to the early 19th century. It is in stone with quoins and a stone-slate roof, and consists of a double-depth three-storey three-bay main block, with a two-storey gabled wing to the right. The windows are mullioned, many of them being workshop windows.	II
The Holden Smithy, Diggle; 53.56347°N 2.00293°W	—	1720s	A house with an adjoining former smithy in stone with a stone-slate roof. The house has two storeys and three bays, with the single-storey former smithy to the left, and a small wing containing a porch. There is a blocked taking-in door at the front, and the windows are mullioned, including a twelve-light workshop window at the rear.	II
6 and 7 Top o' th' Meadow Lane, Austerlands; 53.55290°N 2.05968°W	—	1726	Most of the house dates from the late 18th century. It is in stone on a projecting plinth, and has quoins and a slate roof. There are two storeys and three bays, the left bay recessed and containing a door with a dated lintel. On the front is a 20th-century porch, and the windows are mullioned.	II
43 Platt Lane, Dobcross; 53.55714°N 2.01674°W	—	1726	A house and a barn, which is now incorporated into the house, in stone with quoins and a slate roof. The house has two storeys, two bays, a rear lean-to, and a barn to the left. The windows are mullioned. In the barn is a cart entry and a chamfered shippon door.	II
Higher Barn, Delph; 53.57573°N 2.03081°W	—	1728	The house and adjoining barn are in stone with a stone-slate roof. The house is on a projecting plinth, and has quoins, two storeys and two bays. To the rear left is a barn wing, and to the right is a small extension. Above the door is an initialled and dated lintel, and the windows are mullioned. In the barn is a segmental-headed door, and a shippon door with a chamfered segmental head.	II
Lower Tunstead, Greenfield; 53.53681°N 1.99432°W	—	1730	A pair of stone houses with quoins and a stone-slate roof. They have partly a single and partly a double-depth plan, two storeys, four bays, a rear outshut, a 20th-century left extension, and a 20th-century brick lean-to addition on the right. The windows are mullioned.	II
Barn, Manor House Farm, Dobcross; 53.55299°N 2.03265°W	—	1735	The barn and shippon are in stone that has a stone-slate roof with finials, three bays, an outshut to the left, the shippon to the right, and 20th-century extensions to the front and the rear. The barn has a cart entry with a semicircular head and a keystone, and the shippon has a segmental-headed doorway with a keystone and a datestone above.	II
45 Huddersfield Road, Denshaw; 53.59067°N 2.03519°W	—	Early to mid-18th century	A stone house with quoins, a stone-slate roof, two storeys, two bays, and a recessed bay to the right added in the 19th century. On the front is a blocked square-headed doorway, and the windows are mullioned, those on the top floor having six lights.	II
Barn, Rye Top, Uppermill; 53.54221°N 1.99412°W	—	Early to mid-18th century	A barn with a cottage to the right, the building is in stone with quoins and a stone-slate roof. There are two storeys and three bays. The barn has a segmental-headed cart entrance with a keystone and a winnowing door at the rear. The windows in the cottage are mullioned.	II
Fairbanks Farmhouse and Cottages, Diggle; 53.56386°N 1.98923°W		Early to mid-18th century	The farmhouse and cottages are in stone with stone-slate roofs. The farmhouse has a double-depth plan, three storeys and three bays, and at right angles to the rear is a three-storey three-bay wing added in the late 18th century. The windows are mullioned.	II
Hillcot, Dobcross; 53.55528°N 2.01126°W	—	Early to mid-18th century	A stone house with quoins and a stone-slate roof. It has two storeys and two bays. On the front are 20th-century windows and doors, and at the rear the windows are mullioned.	II
Mowhalls, Dobcross; 53.55266°N 2.01318°W	—	Early to mid-18th century	Originally a house with attached shippon, and a wing added probably in the early 19th century. The building is in stone with quoins, a stone-slate roof, a single-depth plan, two storeys and a total of three bays. The doorways have square heads, and the windows are mullioned.	II
Edgehill, Delph; 53.57546°N 2.03207°W	—	1737	Originally a farmhouse with an attached barn, a later extension to the right, and the barn converted for residential use. The building is in stone with quoins and a slate roof. There are two storeys, the original part had two bays, with a one-bay extension to the right, and the barn to the left. The windows in the house are mullioned. In the barn are replaced windows and a blocked winnowing door at the rear.	II
9 Grains Road, Delph; 53.56694°N 2.02465°W	—	1740	The house was extended to the left in the late 18th century. It is in stone on a projecting plinth, and has quoins and a stone-slate roof. There are two storeys and three bays. On the upper floor of the right bay is a sash window, and the other windows are mullioned.	II
Higher Slack Farmhouse and barn, Delph; 53.58219°N 2.03212°W	—	1740	The house and barn are in stone with a stone-slate roof. The house has quoins, two storeys and two bays, and the barn is to the left. The left bay has a single-depth plan and a doorway with chamfered surround. The right bay is earlier and has a double-depth plan. The windows are mullioned.	II
Manor House, Grasscroft; 53.53841°N 2.03273°W	—	1744	The house was extended in the 18th century and altered in the 19th century. It is in stone with quoins and a stone-slate roof, and has two storeys, two bays, and a two-storey rear wing. Most of the windows are mullioned, and some are mullioned and transomed.	II
Cross Keys public house 53.55299°N 1.98889°W		1745	The public house was extended with two parallel ranges from the rear in the 19th century. It is in stone with quoins and a stone-slate roof. There is a single-depth plan, two and three storeys, and a three-bay front. On the front are two doorways, one with a moulded surround, and a 20th-century window. The other windows are mullioned, and there is another doorway with a moulded surround at the rear.	II
Delph Slack Farmhouse and barn, Denshaw; 53.58225°N 2.03392°W	—	1745	The farmhouse has been converted into three cottages, the barn is to the left, and the building is in stone with a stone-slate roof. It has a single-depth plan, two storeys, five bays, and a later range at the rear. Most of the windows are mullioned, and there are some inserted 20th-century casements. In the barn are a cart entry and a shippon door.	II
Foul Rake House, Greenfield; 53.53634°N 2.00471°W	—	1746	The house was extended in the 18th century with the addition of gabled wings, and the space between them was infilled. The house is in stone with quoins, and a stone-slate roof with finials on the gables. There are two storeys and three bays. The central doorway has pilasters, a tripartite keystone, and a decorative fanlight, and the windows are mullioned.	II
Higher Cross Farmhouse and barn, Uppermill; 53.54580°N 1.99526°W	—	1746	The farmhouse with a later barn to the left are in stone with quoins and a stone-slate roof. The house has shaped eaves gutter brackets, two storeys and two bays. Above the doorway is a dated and initialled lintel. The windows on the front are mullioned, and at the rear are sash windows. The barn has a segmental-headed cart entry and a shippon door.	II
6 Church Fields and cottage, Dobcross; 53.55596°N 2.01351°W	—	1747	The house was later altered and extended. It is in stone with quoins, an eaves cornice, and a stone-slate roof. It has an L-shaped plan and two storeys. There is a central doorway flanked by 19th-century windows, and mullioned windows on the upper floor. The entrance in the gable end has a decorated and dated lintel. The cottage has a projecting plinth and sash windows.	II
Cockleshell Cottage, Dobcross; 53.55764°N 2.01775°W		1747	The house is in stone with quoins and a stone-slate roof. There are two storeys, two bays, and a recessed bay to the right. The windows were originally mullioned; some of the mullioned windows remain, and others have been replaced. At the left is a lean-to garage.	II
Lane View, Grotton; 53.53373°N 2.05009°W	—	1749	A stone house on a projecting plinth, with quoins and a slate roof. It has two storeys, two bays, a rear wing and a 20th-century garage extension to the right. In the centre is a doorway with a square head, with a canted bay window to the right. The other windows are mullioned.	II
1 Ward Lane, Diggle; 53.56476°N 1.99787°W	—	Mid-18th century	A stone house with quoins and a stone-slate roof. It has a single-depth plan, two storeys and four bays. On the front is a gabled porch, and the windows are mullioned, those in the first two bays being replacements.	II
4 Church Fields, Dobcross; 53.55604°N 2.01339°W	—	Mid-18th century	A stone house with quoins and a stone-slate roof. There are two storeys and three bays. The doorway has a chamfered surround, and the windows are mullioned.	II
9 and 10 New Houses, Austerlands; 53.54830°N 2.04299°W	—	Mid-18th century	A pair of houses at right angles forming an L-shaped plan. They are in stone with a dentilled eaves cornice and roofs partly of slate and partly of 20th-century tiles. Each range has two bays. The south range has a lean-to extension to the left, a doorway with an architrave and a cornice, mullioned windows on the front, and a Venetian window in the gable. The east range has quoins, a lean-to porch, a doorway with a keystone lintel, and two Venetian windows on the upper floor. To the right is a lean-to garage and a blocked taking-in door.	II
11 Stone Breaks Road, Austerlands; 53.54237°N 2.05431°W	—	Mid-18th century	A stone house with quoins and a stone-slate roof. It has a double-depth plan, two storeys, two bays, a 20th-century extension to the left, and a small wing set back at the right. The windows are mullioned.	II
45, 47 and 49 Huddersfield Road, Diggle; 53.56062°N 2.00338°W	—	Mid-18th century	Three stone houses with quoins and stone-slate roofs. Facing the road is a two-storey two-bay range, and at right angles to the rear is a three-storey two-bay range. The doorways have square heads, and the windows are mullioned, including workshop windows on the upper floors.	II
Ambrose Cottage and barn, Diggle; 53.56289°N 2.00340°W	—	Mid-18th century	The house and barn are in stone with roofs partly of slate and partly of stone-slate. The house originally had a single-depth plan and two storeys, and later in the century was extended to have a double-depth plan and three storeys. There is a small lean-to brick extension, the windows are mullioned, and the square-headed doorway is in the gable end. The barn is at right angles to the rear, it is earlier, and contains mullioned windows, and has a small single-story extension.	II
Ballgrove Cottage, Uppermill; 53.54344°N 2.00155°W		Mid-18th century	A house that was later altered and expanded, it is in stone with quoins, and has a 20th-century roof covering. There is a double-depth plan, three storeys, two bays, and a small 20th-century extension at the rear. On the front is a 20th-century porch, and the windows are mullioned, including a twelve-light workshop window on the top floor.	II
Bentley Farmhouse, Diggle; 53.58761°N 1.98521°W	—	Mid-18th century	A stone farmhouse on a plinth with a stone-slate roof. It has a double-depth plan, quoins, two storeys, three bays, and a later porch wing at the gable end. The windows are mullioned, including a ten-light window on the upper floor.	II
Birches Farmhouse and cottage, Uppermill; 53.54681°N 1.99288°W	—	Mid-18th century	The farmhouse and the attached cottage to the right are in stone with quoins and a stone-slate roof. There is a single-depth plan, two storeys and six bays, and a 20th-century extension at the rear. On the front is a 20th-century porch, the doorways have square heads, and the windows are mullioned.	II
Brow Farmhouse, Diggle; 53.57802°N 1.99393°W	—	Mid-18th century	The farmhouse, which was altered in the 20th century, is in stone with quoins and a stone-slate roof. It has a double-depth plan, two storeys, five bays, and a later rear wing. The windows are mullioned.	II
Building north of Holly Grove Cottage, Diggle; 53.56099°N 1.99501°W	—	Mid-18th century	A stone house with quoins and a roof partly in slate and partly in stone-slate. It has a single-depth plan, two storeys and three bays. The windows are mullioned, and in the right gable end is a blocked taking-in door.	II
Butterhouse and Lindum Cottage, Dobcross; 53.55572°N 2.00188°W		Mid-18th century	Originally one house, later divided into two dwellings, it is in stone with quoins and a stone-slate roof. There are three storeys, and the windows are mullioned, with a ten-light workshop window on the top floor. On the gable ends are lean-to extensions.	II
Causeway Sett, Delph; 53.57423°N 2.01240°W	—	Mid-18th century	A stone farmhouse with quoins and a slate roof. It has two storeys, three bays, a 20th-century garage to the left, a porch to the right, and an extension at the rear. The windows are mullioned, and some mullions are missing. In the left bay is a blocked taking-in door.	II
Edge End, Dobcross; 53.56047°N 2.00996°W	—	Mid-18th century	A row of five cottages and a barn in stone with a stone-slate roof. It originated as a cottage with an attached barn, and the other cottages were added later. They have two storeys, a total of eight bays, and two lean-to extension to the rear. The windows are mullioned, and on the front are three 20th-century porches. The barn has been converted for residential use, and has a segmental-headed cart entry, now glazed.	II
Grotton Farmhouse and Cottages, Grotton; 53.53742°N 2.05004°W	—	Mid-18th century	The farmhouse and two cottages are in stone with a stone-slate roof, two storeys and a total of seven bays, the right two bays recessed. They have partly single- and partly double depth plans, and the windows are mullioned.	II
Heights Farmhouse, Dobcross; 53.55449°N 2.03580°W	—	Mid-18th century	The farmhouse, later a private house, is in stone with rendered gables, quoins, and a stone-slate roof. It has two storeys, two bays, and 20th-century lean-to extensions to the right, left and rear. The windows are mullioned.	II
Hey Garners Farmhouse and Cottage, Delph; 53.56733°N 2.04042°W	—	Mid-18th century	The cottage is the earlier part, with the farmhouse dating from later in the 18th century. They are in stone with a roof partly in stone-slate and partly in 20th-century tiles. The house has a single-depth plan, three storeys, two bays, an outshut to the right, and a wing to the left. There is a central square-headed blocked doorway. The cottage to the right has quoins, two storeys, and a 20th-century porch. The windows in both parts are mullioned.	II
Higher Castleshaw Cottages, Diggle; 53.58196°N 1.99879°W	—	Mid-18th century	A pair of stone cottages with quoins and a stone-slate roof. There are two storeys, each cottage has one bay, and there is a lean-to extension to the right. The windows are mullioned.	II
Higher Quick Farmhouse, Lydgate; 53.53122°N 2.03842°W	—	Mid-18th century	A stone farmhouse with a slate roof, a single-depth plan, and two storeys. There is a left wing at the rear, a later three-storey rendered right wing at the rear, and a 20th-century lean-to extension on the left. In the centre is a square-headed doorway, and the windows are mullioned.	II
Hilltop House and cottages, Dobcross; 53.56374°N 2.03381°W	—	Mid-18th century	The house, and cottages added to the rear in the 19th century, are in stone and have a stone-slate roof with coped gables. The house has quoins, an eaves cornice, a double-depth plan, two storeys with attics, and two bays. On the front is a 20th-century porch, the windows are mullioned, and there is a blocked taking-in door.	II
Hollin Grove, Dobcross; 53.55739°N 1.99741°W	—	Mid-18th century	A stone house with a stone-slate roof, two storeys and two bays. The windows are mullioned.	II
Holly Grove Cottage, Diggle; 53.56075°N 1.99516°W	—	Mid-18th century	A stone house with quoins and a 20th-century tiled roof. It has two storeys, one bay, and a 20th-century extension and porch. The windows are mullioned.	II
Holly Grove Farm Cottage, Diggle; 53.56165°N 1.99485°W	—	Mid-18th century	A stone house with quoins and a stone-slate roof. There are two storeys, two bays, and a 20th-century extension to the west. The windows are mullioned.	II
Hook Farm Cottage, Diggle; 53.58139°N 1.99381°W	—	Mid-18th century	A stone house with a stone-slate roof and two storeys. It has two bays, with a lean-to porch on the left. The right bay was extended in the late 18th century and projects forward. The windows are mullioned, and in the right bay is a blocked taking-in door.	II
Husteads Farmhouse, cottage and barn, Dobcross; 53.55396°N 2.02587°W	—	Mid-18th century	The building is in stone with quoins and a stone-slate roof. It has two storeys, four bays, a single-depth plan, and a parallel range added later to the rear. There are two square-headed doorways, one with a lintel and a keystone, and the other with a 20th-century porch, and the windows are mullioned. In the barn are two segmental-headed cart entries and a shippon door.	II
Knowl Farmhouse, Uppermill; 53.54413°N 1.99430°W	—	Mid-18th century	A stone farmhouse with quoins and a stone-slate roof. It has two storeys, two bays, a single-storey wing to the left with a 20th-century brick extension to the rear, and an 18th-century rear wing. The windows are mullioned.	II
Ladhill Bridge, Greenfield; 53.53468°N 2.00782°W		Mid-18th century	Originally a horse and footbridge, later a road bridge, it carries Oak View Road over the Chew Brook. The bridge is in stone, and consists of two semicircular arches. It has a stone band, above which is a parapet of upright slabs.	II
Lane Cottage, Grotton; 53.53344°N 2.05078°W	—	Mid-18th century (probable)	The house was restored in 1900. It is in stone on a projecting plinth, with quoins and a stone-slate roof. There are two storeys, two bays, a rear wing to the right, and a lean-to at the rear. The left bay is gabled, and the right bay has a coped parapet. There is a central doorway with a square head, and the windows are mullioned with hood moulds.	II
Manor House, Lydgate; 53.52992°N 2.03936°W	—	Mid-18th century	An additional range was added to the front and a lean-to garage to the right in the 19th century. The house is in stone with a 20th-century tiled roof, and ha stwo storeys. The front range has three bays and a doorway with a square head. The windows in both parts are mullioned.	II
Millcroft Farmhouse and Cottage, Delph; 53.57759°N 2.01701°W	—	Mid-18th century	The house and cottage are in stone with quoins and 20th-century tiled roofs. The main block has three storeys and three bays, there is a two-storey single-bay wing to the right, a 20th-century wing to the left, and a parallel rear range probably dating from the 18th century. The windows are mullioned, and above some are hood moulds.	II
Sett Stones and Set Stones Farmhouse, Dobcross; 53.55954°N 2.03535°W	—	Mid-18th century	Originally one house, later divided into two, the building is in stone with quoins, and has a roof partly of slate and partly of 20th-century tiles. It has a single-depth plan, two storeys and a basement, two bays, a later bay to the left, and a lean-to extension on the right. The doorways have square heads, and the windows are mullioned, with some mullions missing.	II
Wood Barn Farmhouse and barn, Denshaw; 53.58435°N 2.01370°W	—	Mid-18th century	The farmhouse and barn are in stone with a stone-slate roof. The house has a double-depth plan, quoins, two storeys, and two bays. The doorways have chamfered surrounds, the windows are mullioned, and at the rear is a blocked taking-in doorway. The barn to the right has a blocked cart entry.	II
Wood Farmhouse and barns, Denshaw; 53.58530°N 2.01296°W	—	Mid-18th century	The farmhouse was largely rebuilt and the barns were added in the 19th century, and they are in stone with a stone-slate roof. The house is on a projecting plinth and has quoins, a double-depth plan, two storeys, and a symmetrical front. The central doorway has a fanlight, a keystone, and an archivolt, and above it is a moulded panel. The windows on the front contain 20th-century casements, and the window above the door has an enriched lintel and a cornice. In the gable is a round-headed window, and at the rear the windows are mullioned. The barns are on each side of the farmhouse and contain cart entrances with segmental and elliptical arches.	II
Lawton chest tomb, Uppermill; 53.55431°N 1.98970°W	—	18th century	The chest tomb is in the churchyard of St Chad's Church, and commemorates members of the Lawton family. It is in stone, and consists of a slab carried on blind balustrading with half-balusters. The slab is carved with a decorative panel, and an inscription including the names of those buried.	II
Mayfield, Springhead; 53.54378°N 2.05883°W	—	18th century	A stone house on a projecting plinth, with quoins, a moulded eaves cornice, and a slate roof. It has a single-depth plan, two storeys, two bays, a single-bay extension to the right, and a rear lean-to extension. There is a central doorway, and the windows are mullioned, including an eleven-light workshop window on the upper floor.	II
The Farmhouse, Uppermill; 53.54516°N 1.99930°W	—	18th century	A stone house, rendered at the front, with quoins and a stone-slate roof. It has a single-depth plan with two storeys and three bays, and a 20th-century lean-to extension to the right. There is a central doorway, and the windows are mullioned.	II
Thurstons and barn, Diggle; 53.57572°N 1.98914°W	—	18th century	The barn is the earlier, with the house dating from the late 18th century, and both are in stone with stone-slate roofs. The house has two storeys, two bays, and a continuous rear outshut. In the centre is a 20th-century porch, and the windows are mullioned, including an eleven-light workshop window on the upper floor. The barn is at right angles to the rear, and has quoins, opposing cart entrances, a shippon door, coped gables, and a small extension at the gable end.	II
Ivy Cottage, Dobcross; 53.55604°N 2.01456°W	—	1756	A stone house with quoins and a slate roof. It has two storeys and three bays, and the windows are mullioned.	II
39 Thorpe Lane, Austerlands; 53.54672°N 2.06280°W	—	Soon after 1758	Originally a toll house for the Austerlands to Wakefield turnpike road, and later a private house. It is in stone with a stone-slate roof, and has two storeys, one bay, and a lean-to extension to the right. On the front is a doorway with a square head, a four-light mullioned window on the upper floor, and a paired sash window divided by a mullion on the ground floor.	II
Lower Slack Farmhouse and barn, Denshaw; 53.58183°N 2.03353°W	—	1760	The farmhouse and barn are in stone with a stone-slate roof. The original house had two storeys and two bays, a bay was added to the right, and a barn to the left, and there is a small single-story extension to the right. The barn extends as an outshut in front of the house, and has quoins and an elliptical-arched cart entry. The windows in the house are mullioned.	II
Milestone, Austerlands; 53.54631°N 2.06202°W	—	c. 1760	The milestone was provided for the Austerlands turnpike road. It consists of a plain square shaft inscribed with the distances in miles to Manchester and to Huddersfield.	II
Pastures Farmhouse, Austerlands; 53.55179°N 2.06026°W	—	1764 (probable)	A stone farmhouse with quoins and a slate roof. It has a single-depth plan, three storeys and one bays. At the rear is a 20th-century porch and a square-headed doorway. In the gable end is a blocked doorway with a keystone lintel, and the windows are mullioned, including eight-light windows on the two upper floors.	II
Heights Chapel, Delph; 53.57817°N 2.02837°W		1765	The church is now redundant and under the care of the Churches Conservation Trust. It is in stone with quoins and has a stone-slate roof with coped gables. The church consists of a nave, a small chancel and a vestry, and on the west gable is a bellcote. At the west end are double doors in architraves with dated lintels and a cornice. In the east ends of the chancel and the vestry are Venetian windows. Inside there are galleries on three sides.	II*
Hillside Cottage, Dobcross; 53.55518°N 2.01092°W	—	1765	A stone house with a stone-slate roof, a single-depth plan, two storeys, and two bays. The central doorway has been blocked and a doorway inserted to the right. The windows are mullioned, there is a datestone, and a blocked taking-in door.	II
The Swan Inn, Dobcross; 53.55635°N 2.01300°W		1765	The public house is in stone with quoins and a stone-slate roof. It has a double-depth plan, two storeys with a basement and attic, two bays, and a later recessed two-storey wing to the left. The windows are mullioned, and the entrance with a datestone above is in the left gable end.	II
Lower Carr, Diggle; 53.57261°N 1.99678°W	—	1765 (probable)	A stone house with a stone-slate roof, a double-depth plan, three storeys, and later extensions. It has a central doorway with a rusticated surround and a lintel with a keystone. The windows are mullioned, including a ten-light workshop window on the top floor, and there is a blocked taking-in door at the rear.	II
1 and 3 Streethouse Lane, Dobcross; 53.55396°N 2.02078°W	—	Mid- to late 18th century	A pair of stone houses with a stone-slate roof and three storeys. Each house has one bay, and there is a small entrance wing on the right. The windows are mullioned, and most have five or six lights each.	II
12 Church Fields, Dobcross; 53.55610°N 2.01348°W	—	Mid- to late 18th century	A stone house with quoins and a stone-slate roof. It has three bays, and three and four storeys. On the front is a lean-to on the ground floor, and mullioned windows above. A flight of external steps gives access to the upper floors.	II
25 Huddersfield Road, Diggle; 53.56010°N 2.00349°W	—	Mid- to late 18th century	A stone house with a stone-slate roof, two storeys, and three bays, the right two bays being gabled. The left bay contains mullioned windows, and in the right bays are a 20th-century doorway and windows.	II
Clarke's Cottage, Uppermill; 53.55417°N 1.98817°W	—	Mid- to late 18th century	A stone house with quoins and a stone-slate roof. It has a single-depth plan, two storeys, two bays, and a 20th-century outshut at the rear. On the front is a 20th-century porch, and the windows are mullioned, including an eight-light workshop window on the upper floor.	II
Hollin Greave, Dobcross; 53.55735°N 1.99732°W	—	Mid- to late 18th century	A stone house with quoins and a stone-slate roof. It has a double-depth plan, two storeys and two bays. On the front is a 20th-century porch, and the windows are mullioned.	II
Holly Grove Cottage, Diggle; 53.56078°N 1.99545°W	—	Mid- to late 18th century	A stone house on a projecting plinth with quoins and a stone-slate roof. It has two storeys and one bay. On the front are mullioned windows, and in the left gable is a doorway and a replaced window.	II
Running Hill Farmhouse, Dobcross; 53.55896°N 1.98651°W	—	Mid- to late 18th century	Originally a farmhouse, later a private house, it is in stone with quoins and a stone-slate roof. It has a single-depth plan, two storeys, two bays, and a 20th-century extension to the right. The windows on the front are mullioned, including an eight-light workshop window on the upper floor. On the front is a 20th-century porch, and at the rear some windows have been replaced.	II
Slack Field Farmhouse, Dobcross; 53.56358°N 2.02766°W	—	Mid- to late 18th century	Originally a farmhouse, later a private house, in stone with quoins, shaped eaves gutter brackets, and a slate roof with coped gables. It has three storeys, two bays, a rear wing, and a small lean-to on the left. On the front is a 20th-century porch, and the windows are mullioned.	II
The Old Cottage and 5 Saddleworth Fold, Uppermill; 53.55125°N 1.99657°W	—	Mid- to late 18th century	Two stone houses with a stone-slate roof, a single-depth plan, two storeys, four bays, and a former barn wing at the rear. On the front is a 20th-century porch and mullioned windows, including a 14-light workshop window on the upper floor. The former barn wing has been converted into a house, and has a blocked cart entry, mullioned windows, and a former shippon door with a chamfered surround.	II
Wharf Cottages, Greenfield; 53.53823°N 2.01354°W	—	Mid- to late 18th century	A row of three stone houses incorporating an earlier house, and with later additions. The building is in stone with quoins and a stone-slate roof. It has three storeys and four bays, the fourth bay being later and taller and with an eaves cornice. The doorways have square heads, and the windows are mullioned.	II
White Lion public house, Delph; 53.56906°N 2.02359°W		Mid- to late 18th century	Originally three cottages, later combined into a public house, it is in stone with a stone-slate roof and has three bays. The first bay has three storeys, quoins, a blocked doorway with a rusticated keystone lintel, and to the right an inserted doorway with a chamfered surround. The former two cottages to the right have two storeys and doorways are blocked. The windows in all parts are mullioned; in the right two bays the upper floor contains a twelve-light workshop window.	II
Woodbrook Farmhouse, Austerlands; 53.54522°N 2.04931°W	—	Mid- to late 18th century	A stone house with a stone-slate roof. It has two storeys and three bays, and a lean-to extension at the rear. In the front is a 20th-century porch, and the windows are mullioned.	II
Upper House and Upper House Farmhouse, Dobcross; 53.55281°N 2.03484°W	—	1766	The oldest part is the farmhouse, with later added extensions including the attached house in the 19th century. The building is in stone with a stone-slate roof, two storeys, five bays, and a rear wing on the right. The first two bays form the original farmhouse and have mullioned windows and later doors, the third bay also has mullioned windows, it is on a plinth and has quoins, and the other two bays forming the house have 20th-century casement windows and a doorway.	II
Well Croft and Well Croft House, Diggle; 53.58139°N 1.99415°W	—	1768 (possible)	A pair of houses that were extended in the 18th century and again in the 20th century. They are in stone with stone-slate roofs, and have quoins, a double-depth plan, three storeys and two bays. The windows are mullioned, and at the rear is a lean-to and a blocked taking-in door.	II
Delph Fish and Chip Shop; 53.56812°N 2.02404°W		1769	Originally two houses, later incorporating a shop, it is in stone with quoins and a stone-slate roof. There are two storeys and two bays. To the right of each bay is a doorway, each with an initialled and dated lintel. There is one 19th-century mullioned window, and the other three windows contain original double-chamfered moulded mullions.	II
9 Sugar Lane, Dobcross; 53.55581°N 2.01229°W	—	Before 1770	A stone house with a stone-slate roof, two storeys, two bays, the left bay protruding forward, and a lean-to extension to the right. In the left bay is a square-headed doorway, most of the windows are mullioned, and there are some sash windows.	II
Brimmy Croft Farmhouse, Denshaw; 53.59746°N 2.04171°W	—	1770	The farmhouse is in stone with quoins and a slate roof. It has two storeys, the original part has two bays, two bays were later added to the right, and a wing and an outshut to the rear. In the centre of the original part is an initialled datestone. The windows are mullioned.	II
Hillend, Austerlands; 53.54384°N 2.05330°W	—	c. 1770	A stone house with a stone-slate roof, it has a single-depth plan, two storeys, two bays, and a rear outshut. The door is in the right gable end, and the windows are mullioned.	II
Rye Top, Uppermill; 53.54345°N 1.99143°W	—	c. 1770	The second bay was added in the late 18th century. The house is in stone with quoins and a stone-slate roof with a coped right gable. It has two storeys, two bays, and a porch on the right gable end. The windows are mullioned.	II
Sandbed House, Delph; 53.57206°N 2.01433°W	—	c. 1770	A stone house with quoins and a stone-slate roof. It has a single-depth plan, three storeys, two bays, and a lean-to extension to the right. The central doorway has a square head, the windows on the front are mullioned, and at the rear they are 20th-century replacements.	II
Brownhill Bridge Mill, Dobcross; 53.55420°N 2.00926°W	—	1772	A former water-powered woollen mill, in stone with a roof partly in slate and partly in stone-slate. There are three storeys and four bays. On the right side is a segmental-headed tail race opening. The windows are mullioned, including workshop windows with 12 and 13 lights. Some windows on the upper floor have been replaced by large vented openings.	II
Hillend House and Hill End Cottage, Austerlands; 53.54375°N 2.05367°W	—	1773	Originally one house, later divided into two, it is in stone with quoins and a 20th-century tiled roof. There is a single-depth plan, two storeys, two bays, and a 20th-century wing on each side. The windows are mullioned, and there is a decorative datestone also containing initials with a moulded hood.	II
Diggle Edge Farmhouse, barn and cottages, Diggle; 53.57385°N 1.98017°W	—	1770s	A farmhouse and barn, with cottages to the right dating from about 1800, in stone with stone-slate roofs. The house has a single-depth plan, two storeys, two bays, a lean-to the left, a square-headed doorway, and mullioned windows. The barn has a corbelled lintel, a cornice, and a shippon door. The cottages have a timber lean-to in front of the ground floor, the windows are mullioned, and at the rear is a first-floor taking-in door.	II
1 New Barn, Delph; 53.57728°N 2.04485°W	—	Late 18th century	A stone house with a stone-slate roof, three storeys, two bays, and a single-storey extension to the rear. The doorways have square heads, and the windows are mullioned, some of them with nine lights. In the right gable end stone steps lead up to a doorway on the middle floor.	II
1 Woods Lane, Dobcross; 53.55649°N 2.01350°W		Late 18th century	Originally back-to-back houses, they were put under a single roof in the 19th century, used as a bank and a shop, and then as two private houses. They are in stone with quoins and a stone-slate roof. There are two storeys and two bays. The right house has a shop window on the ground floor, and the other windows are sashes. In the right return is a blocked taking-in door.	II
1 and 2 Rush Hall Road, Uppermill; 53.54356°N 2.00156°W		Late 18th century	A pair of stone houses with quoins, a stone-slate roof, three storeys, two bays, and entrance wing to the left, and a rear outshut. On the front is a blocked doorway with a square head. The windows are mullioned, including a 14-light workshop window on the top floor.	II
1, 3, 5 and 7 Quick Road, Lydgate; 53.53030°N 2.03914°W	—	Late 18th century	A row of four stone houses with stone-slate roof, and double-depth plans. Nos. 1 and 3 have three storeys and one bay each. Nos. 5 and 7 were originally one house with four storeys and three bays. The doorways have square heads, and the windows are mullioned.	II
2 Laureate's Place, Austerlands; 53.54514°N 2.04920°W	—	Late 18th century	A stone house with a stone-slate roof, it has two storeys with a basement, and two bays. The central doorway has a square head, and the windows are mullioned, including a 17-light window on the upper floor.	II
2 Saint Mary's Gate and 73 High Street, Uppermill; 53.54855°N 2.00577°W	—	Late 18th century	Two houses and a shop in stone with a stone-slate roof and four storeys. The oldest part is the house at the rear which has mullioned windows including a seven-light window. The other house and the shop date from the early 19th century, with three bays on Saint Mary's Gate and two on High Street. On both fronts are sash windows, quoins and an eaves cornice, on the Saint Mary's Gate front are blocked loading doors, and on the High Street front is a shop window.	II
2 and 2A Thurstons House, Diggle; 53.57554°N 1.98924°W	—	Late 18th century	A pair of stone houses incorporating earlier material, with a stone-slate roof, quoins, three storeys, three bays, and a two-storey extension at the rear. On the front is a 20th-century porch and a bow window, and the other windows are mullioned.	II
2, 3 and 4 The Shaws, Uppermill; 53.54558°N 1.99973°W		Late 18th century	Originally two houses, now three, they are in stone with quoins and a stone-slate roof. They are partly in a single-depth plan and partly in a double-shaped plan, with three storeys and three bays. The doorway has a square head, and the windows are mullioned, including 14-light windows at the front and the rear. Also at the rear are two blocked taking-in doorways.	II
2 and 4 Bunkers, Greenfield; 53.53866°N 1.99552°W	—	Late 18th century	A pair of stone houses with a stone-slate roof, three storeys, and each house has three bays. No. 4 is pebbledashed, and has a single-depth plan, quoins, and a 21-light workshop window. No. 2 has a double-depth plan and a central doorway. The windows are mullioned.	II
3 Crib Lane, Dobcross; 53.55736°N 2.01467°W	—	Late 18th century	A stone house with a stone-slate roof, it has a single-depth plan, two storeys and two bays. On the front is a 20th-century porch, and the windows are mullioned.	II
3 Shaws Fold, Austerlands; 53.54190°N 2.05371°W	—	Late 18th century	A stone house with a roof in stone-slate at the front and 20th-century tiles at the rear. It has a single-depth plan, three storeys, two bays, and a small 20th-century extension to the right. Above the door is a fanlight, and the windows are mullioned.	II
3 Tame Lane, Delph; 53.57919°N 2.04040°W	—	Late 18th century	The house, which incorporates a 17th-century cruck-frame, originated as two cottages. It is in stone with a stone-slate roof, a single-depth plan, two storeys, and two bays. There are two doorways, one blocked, and the windows are mullioned.	II
3 Thorpe Lane, Austerlands; 53.54651°N 2.06435°W	—	Late 18th century	A house and cottage, now combined into one dwelling, in stone with stone-slate roofs. The former house has three storeys, two bays, and a central square-headed doorway. The former cottage to the left dates from the 19th century, and has a round-headed doorway with a fanlight and a keystone. The windows in both parts are mullioned.	II
4 Crib Lane, Dobcross; 53.55820°N 2.01373°W	—	Late 18th century	A stone house with quoins and a stone-slate roof. It has a single-depth plan, three storeys and two bays, and the windows are mullioned.	II
4 Tame Lane, Delph; 53.57916°N 2.04027°W	—	Late 18th century	A stone house with a stone-slate roof, a double-depth plan, two storeys, two bays, a 20th-century porch, and a 20th-century garage. The windows are mullioned and include ten- and twelve-light workshop windows on the upper floor.	II
4 and 6 Laureate's Place, Austerlands; 53.54528°N 2.04940°W	—	Late 18th century	Originally a house with a double-depth plan, later back-to-back houses, the building is in stone with a stone-slate roof. It has three storeys, one bay, and a lean-to extension at the rear. The windows are mullioned, including a nine-light window in each upper floor.	II
4 and 6 Woods Lane, 1, 14 and 16 Church Fields, Dobcross; 53.55618°N 2.01379°W	—	Late 18th century	A group of stone houses with quoins, and a stone-slate roof. There are three storeys and a total of four bays, the first bay having a canted corner. The windows are mullioned.	II
5 Tame Lane, Delph; 53.57935°N 2.04033°W	—	Late 18th century	A stone house with ground-floor quoins, a stone-slate roof, a double-depth plan, three storeys, and one bay. The doorway has a keystone lintel, and the windows are mullioned.	II
6 Tame Lane, Delph; 53.57933°N 2.04041°W	—	Late 18th century	A stone house with quoins on the lower two floors, a stone-slate roof, a double-depth plan, three storeys, and one bay. There is a 20th-century doorway, and the windows are mullioned.	II
6, 8 and 10 Hill End Road, Delph; 53.56666°N 2.01919°W	—	Late 18th century	Two stone houses with a stone-slate roof, a single-depth plan, three storeys and three bays. The windows are mullioned, there is a small porch in the left gable end, and at the rear is a blocked taking-in door.	II
7 Diglee and Heather Cottage, Diggle; 53.56892°N 1.98880°W	—	Late 18th century	A pair of stone houses with a stone-slate roof. They have three storeys, each house has one bay, and there are 20th-century extensions to the right and the rear. The windows are mullioned.	II
7 and 8 Wall Hill and barn, Dobcross; 53.55429°N 2.03183°W	—	Late 18th century	The building is in stone with stone-slate roofs. Each house has two storeys and one bays, and the barn is at the rear of No. 7. The windows of No. 7 are mullioned. No. 8, to the right, later, lower and smaller has a 19th-century window on the ground floor and a mullioned window above. The barn has stables on the lower level.	II
8 and 6 Saint Mary's Gate, Uppermill; 53.54858°N 2.00603°W	—	Late 18th century	A pair of stone houses with a stone-slate roof. They have a single-depth plan, three storeys, one bay each, and there is a small two-storey entrance bay to the left. The doorways have square heads, and the windows are mullioned.	II
8 and 10 Oldham Road, Delph; 53.56344°N 2.02259°W	—	Late 18th century	A pair of stone houses with a stone-slate roof. They have three storeys, each house has one bay, and at the rear of No. 8 is a later two storey wing. There is a five-light mullioned window on the ground and middle floors of both houses, and on the top floor is a continuous 13-light mullioned window.	II
9 and 11 High Street, Delph; 53.56862°N 2.02388°W		Late 18th century	A pair of stone houses, later incorporating a shop, with quoins and a stone-slate roof. There are three storeys and three bays, each bay stepping back. In the first bay is a 20th-century shop front, and the third bay contains a doorway with a shaped lintel. The windows are mullioned.	II
10 Saint Mary's Gate, Uppermill; 53.54855°N 2.00605°W	—	Late 18th century	A stone house with a stone-slate roof, a single-depth plan, three storeys, and one bay. On the front is a flight of steps leading to a square-headed doorway on the middle floor and three 20th-century windows, one inserted into a former taking-in door. The principal elevation is the rear, with a doorway and mullioned windows.	II
11 Harrop Green, Diggle; 53.57011°N 1.99251°W	—	Late 18th century	A stone house with quoins and a stone-slate roof. It has a double-depth plan, two storeys, and two bays. On the front is a 20th-century porch and a square-headed doorway, and the windows are mullioned.	II
12 Saint Mary's Gate, Uppermill; 53.54845°N 2.00610°W	—	Late 18th century	A stone house with a stone-slate roof, a single-depth plan, three storeys, and one bay. The windows are mullioned, the doorways have square heads, and at the rear is a blocked taking-in doorway.	II
13 The Shaws, Uppermill; 53.54513°N 1.99917°W		Late 18th century	A stone house with quoins and a stone-slate roof. There are two storeys and one bay, and the windows are mullioned.	II
14 The Shaws, Uppermill; 53.54517°N 1.99917°W	—	Late 18th century	A stone house on a projecting plinth, with quoins and a stone-slate roof. It has three storeys and one bay. The windows are mullioned, and on the right gable end are two 20th-century porches.	II
14 and 16 Sandy Lane, Dobcross; 53.55675°N 2.01303°W	—	Late 18th century (or earlier)	A pair of stone houses with a stone-slate roof. They have a double-depth plan, three storeys and two bays, and lean-to extensions to the left and at the rear. The windows are mullioned.	II
15, 17 and 19 Woods Lane, Dobcross; 53.55615°N 2.01419°W		Late 18th century	A row of three stone houses with quoins, a stone-slate roof, and three storeys. No. 19 has two bays, and the other houses have one bay each. No. 19 has a central door and mullioned windows, on the top floor is a workers' window with twelve lights. No. 17 has a 19th-century door and window on the ground floor, and on the upper floor mullioned windows have been inserted into tanking-in doors. No. 15 is entered at the side and has a three-light mullioned window in each floor.	II
18 and 12A Sandy Lane, Dobcross; 53.55675°N 2.01289°W	—	Late 18th century	A house and a flat in stone with a stone-slate roof. There are four storeys and three bays. In the centre is a doorway, and the windows are mullioned. At the rear is a lean-to extension, and external steps leading up to the flat.	II
25 and 27 Spurn Lane, Diggle; 53.56337°N 2.00298°W	—	Late 18th century	A pair of stone cottages with a slate roof, two storeys, and a double-depth plan. Each cottage has two bays, a 20th-century porch, a doorway with a square head, and mullioned windows.	II
27–29 Wool Lane, Dobcross; 53.55740°N 2.00633°W	—	Late 18th century	Originally one house, later divided into two, it is in stone with quoins and a stone-slate roof. There are three storeys and a symmetrical front of three bays. In the central bay is a square-headed doorway and a single-light window on the upper floors. The outer bays have a five-light mullioned window in each floor.	II
29–31 Wool Lane, Dobcross; 53.55752°N 2.00620°W	—	Late 18th century	Originally one house, with a rear wing added in the early 19th century, and later three houses. The building is in stone with a stone-slate roof, three storeys, a front of two bays, and a rear wing. In each wing is a square-headed doorway to the left, the middle floor contains two three-light windows, and on the top floor is an eight-light window, all the windows being mullioned.	II
41 Huddersfield Road, Denshaw; 53.59071°N 2.03533°W	—	Late 18th century	A pair of cottages combined into one house, in stone with a stone-slate roof. It has a single-depth plan, two storeys, two bays, and the windows are mullioned.	II
43 Woods Lane, Dobcross; 53.55554°N 2.01553°W	—	Late 18th century	A stone house with a 20th-century tiled roof. It has three bays, the first bay has three storeys, and the others have two. On the ground floor of the first bay are a doorway and a window. The windows are mullioned, the workshop window on the top floor having twelve lights.	II
45 Platt Lane, Dobcross; 53.55716°N 2.01682°W	—	Late 18th century	A stone house with quoins and a stone-slate roof. It has a single-depth plan, two storeys at the front, three storeys at the rear, and one bay. On the front is a lean-to at the left, and a doorway to the right. The windows are mullioned.	II
52 and 54 Clough Lane, Grasscroft; 53.53800°N 2.03010°W	—	Late 18th century	A pair of stone houses with quoins, and a roof partly of slate and partly of stone-slate. Each house has a double-depth plan, three storeys and one bay. The windows are mullioned, and there is a blocked dovecote in the gable.	II
73, 75 and 77 Stockport Road, Lydgate; 53.53505°N 2.04101°W	—	Late 18th century	A row of three stone houses with plain eaves gutter brackets and a stone-slate roof. They have a double-depth plan, two storeys and five bays. On the front are two blocked doorways, a doorway with a square head, and two doors with fanlights. The windows are mullioned.	II
207 and 207A Oldham Road and 2 and 4 Cooper Street, Springhead; 53.53750°N 2.05866°W	—	Late 18th century	A pair of back-to-back houses in stone with quoins, a sill band, a rendered gable, and a stone-slate roof. They have three storeys and two bays. There are entrances on the front and on the middle floor on the Cooper Street face, and the windows are mullioned.	II
Ackers Farmhouse, Diggle; 53.58014°N 1.99220°W	—	Late 18th century	A stone house with quoins and a stone-slate roof. It is built into a hillside, and has a double-depth plan and three storeys. On the front is a 20th-century porch, the windows are mullioned, and at the rear is a conservatory.	II
Albion Farmhouse, Dobcross; 53.55810°N 2.03299°W	—	Late 18th century	The farmhouse is in stone with a stone-slate roof, a single-depth plan, two storeys, three bays, and a rear wing on the right. The front is symmetrical with a central 20th-century surround, and two six-light mullioned windows in each floor.	II
Ash Cottage, Greenfield; 53.53613°N 2.00061°W	—	Late 18th century	A stone house with quoins, a stone-slate roof, two storeys, and two bays. There are two doorways, one blocked, both with chamfered lintels, and the windows are mullioned.	II
Back o'th'Lee, Diggle; 53.56481°N 1.98629°W	—	Late 18th century	A house, barn, and cottage, incorporating a former dairy, are in stone with a stone-slate roof. The house is in the centre with two storeys and two bays, with the cottage to the left and the barn to the right. The house has a central 20th-century porch, mullioned windows and a blocked taking-in door. The cottage has a 20th-century porch and 19th-century windows, and in the barn is a segmental-headed cart entry and a shippon door.	II
Blackleach Farmhouse, Springhead; 53.54399°N 2.05846°W	—	Late 18th century	A stone farmhouse with a stone-slate roof. It has a double-depth plan, two storeys, and a rendered extension to the right. There is a central doorway and the windows are mullioned.	II
Bont, Dobcross; 53.55745°N 1.99760°W		Late 18th century	A stone house incorporating earlier material, with quoins, three storeys and one bay. On the front is a 20th-century porch, and there is a doorway in the left gable end. Most of the windows are mullioned.	II
Bridge House, Dobcross; 53.55527°N 2.01173°W	—	Late 18th century	A stone house with a roof partly of stone-slate and partly of slate. It has a U-shaped plan, a main range of three storeys and three bays, the first and third bays projecting, and a single-storey wing to the right. Most of the windows are mullioned, including a twelve-light workshop window, and there is one casement window. In the second bay is a square-headed doorway, and a flight of external steps.	II
Broadhead, Denshaw; 53.58822°N 2.00849°W	—	Late 18th century	A stone house with quoins and a stone-slate roof. It has a single-depth plan, two storeys, three bays, a parallel rear range to the left, and a 20th-century garage to the left. The windows are mullioned.	II
Building between 10 and 12 Saint Mary's Gate, Uppermill; 53.54848°N 2.00608°W	—	Late 18th century	A house, later converted into a workshop, it is in stone with a stone-slate roof. The building has four storeys and four bays. In the front is a doorway with a square head, a later inserted doorway, and four 20-pane casement windows. At the rear the windows are mullioned.	II
Bunkers Farmhouse, Greenfield; 53.53868°N 1.99493°W	—	Late 18th century	This originated as a farmhouse with attached barn, it has since been altered, and was extended in the 20th century. The building is in stone with quoins and has a stone-slate roof with a coped gable. The house has three storeys and one bay, with the former barn to the right, a 20th-century extension to the left, and a former dairy wing at the rear. The winnowing door has a corbelled lintel, and has been converted into a doorway, the segmental-headed cart entry has been glazed, and garage doors have been inserted. Most windows are mullioned, and there is one 20th-century window.	II
Candy Cottage, Uppermill; 53.55203°N 1.98811°W	—	Late 18th century	A stone house with a rendered right gable, quoins, and a stone-slate roof. It has a single-depth plan, two storeys and two bays. The windows are mullioned, and at the rear is a small arched window, and a blocked window and door on the upper floor.	II
Carr Farmhouse, Spring Cottage and adjoining cottage, Diggle; 53.57275°N 1.99709°W	—	Late 18th century	Originally one house, later extended and divided into three dwellings. It is in stone with a stone-slate roof, a double-depth plan, three storeys, a later three-storey wing, and a conservatory at the left. On the front are two bays. The later part has a doorway with a rusticated surround and a lintel with a keystone, and the windows are sashes. Elsewhere the doorways have square heads, and the windows are mullioned.	II
Cartref and Cartref Cottage, Denshaw; 53.59094°N 2.03557°W	—	Late 18th century	A house and cottage in stone with quoins and a stone-slate roof. The house has a double-depth plan, two storeys, and two bays, and there is a two-storey single-depth cottage to the right. The house has a doorway with a square head and mullioned windows, including a 13-light workshop window on the upper floor. The cottage has a doorway with a chamfered surround, and mullioned windows.	II
Catshead Nook, Grasscroft; 53.54238°N 2.03178°W	—	Late 18th century	A stone house with square eaves gutter brackets and a stone-slate roof. There are two storeys, three bays, a lean-to extension on the right, and a continuous outshut at the rear. On the front is a 20th-century flat-roofed porch, and the windows are mullioned.	II
Causeway Sett Farmhouse, Delph; 53.57472°N 2.01214°W	—	Late 18th century	A stone farmhouse on a projecting plinth with quoins and a slate roof. It has three storeys, three bays, and a rear wing. In the centre is a doorway with a moulded surround and a hood, and the windows are mullioned, including a ten-light workshop window on the top floor.	II
Clough House, Grasscroft; 53.53781°N 2.02905°W	—	Late 18th century	A house and cottage in stone with a stone-slate roof, which was extended to the right in the 19th century, and a two-storey outshut has been added to the rear. The original part has three storeys, two bays. The additional bay has two storeys, a hipped roof, and contains a doorway with a rusticated surround and a fanlight. Both parts have an eaves cornice and mullioned windows.	II
Cottage north of Primrose Hill Farmhouse, Uppermill; 53.55140°N 1.98592°W		Late 18th century	The cottage and barn to the left are in stone with quoins and a stone-slate roof. The house has a double-depth plan, two storeys, one bay, and a brick lean-to extension at the rear. The doors in the house and barn have square heads, and the windows are mullioned.	II
Cottage northeast of Ash Cottage, Greenfield; 53.53621°N 2.00074°W	—	Late 18th century	The cottage is in stone with a stone-slate roof, and the right gable is rendered. It has quoins, a double-depth plan, two storeys, and one bay. The doorway has a chamfered surround and a segmental head, and windows are mullioned.	II
Cottages opposite No. 2 Horest Lane, Denshaw; 53.58335°N 2.04834°W	—	Late 18th century	Originally four back-to-back houses, later converted into three cottages, they are in stone with a stone-slate roof. They have two storeys and three bays. The windows are mullioned, and there are two 20th-century porches.	II
Delph Bridge; 53.56837°N 2.02384°W		Late 18th century (probable)	The bridge carries the A6052 road over the River Tame. It is in stone, and consists of a single segmental arch with a hump back and a parapet with chamfered coping stones. To the west is a 20th-century footbridge.	II
Drybridge, Diggle; 53.57977°N 1.98619°W	—	Late 18th century	A stone house with a stone-slate roof, a double-depth plan, two storeys, three bays, and a small lean-to against the left gable. The third bay is later, recessed, and contains a 20th-century porch in the angle. The windows are mullioned, including a nine-light workshop window on the upper floor. At the rear is a four-light window and a blocked taking-in door on the upper floor.	II
Fair View, Diggle; 53.58177°N 1.99477°W	—	Late 18th century	A stone house with a stone-slate roof, quoins, two storeys and two bays. A parallel range with a canted right end was added to the front in the 19th century. On the front is a doorway with a lintel and a keystone. At the rear are mullioned windows including a twelve-light workshop window on the upper floor.	II
Field Top, Dobcross; 53.55708°N 1.99593°W	—	Late 18th century	A stone house, partly rendered, with quoins and a stone-slate roof. There are three storeys, two bays, a left lean-to, and 20th-century extensions to the right and the rear. On the front is a 20th-century porch. The windows are mullioned, and at the rear is an arched stair window.	II
Former house east of Ridge Farmhouse, Diggle; 53.57452°N 1.98945°W	—	Late 18th century	The house, which incorporates earlier material, is in stone with a stone-slate roof. It has a single-depth plan, quoins, three storeys, and two bays. The windows are mullioned, including a seven-light window on the middle floor, and a 14-light workshop window on the top floor.	II
Hanson House, Delph; 53.57523°N 2.04884°W	—	Late 18th century	A stone house with a rendered gable end, a slate roof, a single-depth plan, two storeys, four bays, and a small later parallel range to the rear. On the front are two square-headed doorways, one blocked, each with a plain hood and a datestone above. The windows are mullioned.	II
Heights Farmhouse, Delph; 53.57720°N 2.02947°W	—	Late 18th century	A stone farmhouse with quoins and a stone-slate roof. It has a single-depth plan, three storeys, three bays, and lean-to extensions to the right and the rear. Above the door is a fanlight, and the windows are mullioned, including 14-light workshop windows on the top floor at the front and the rear.	II
Heightsfield, Dobcross; 53.55317°N 2.03401°W	—	Late 18th century	A stone house with a slate roof, two storeys, two bays, a 20th-century garage to the left and a former barn wing at the rear. On the front is a porch that has a round-headed opening with a shaped keystone and decorative bargeboards. The windows are mullioned, including two eight-light windows, and in the barn is a blocked arched doorway.	II
Heys Farmhouse and barn, Delph; 53.56853°N 2.03595°W	—	Late 18th century	The farmhouse and barn are in stone with a stone-slate roof. The house has two storeys, two bays, and a later bay to the right. On the front is a 20th-century porch, and the windows are mullioned. The barn is to the left.	II
Higher House and Higher House Cottage, Dobcross; 53.55851°N 2.03563°W	—	Late 18th century	The house and attached cottage are in stone with a slate roof, and have two storeys. The house to the left has a single-depth plan, two bays, a central doorway with a square head and a fanlight, mullioned windows, and a blocked taking-in door at the rear. The cottage is taller, projects forward, has a double-depth plan, one bay, and a single-storey wing to the right. The windows are mullioned, and in the gable are blocked owl holes.	II
Hill Cottage, Greenfield; 53.52654°N 2.01586°W	—	Late 18th century	A stone house with quoins and a slate roof. It has two storeys and three bays, the first bay, the earliest part of the house, protruding forwards. The doorway has a square head, and the windows are mullioned.	II
Hollin Bank Farmhouse, Denshaw; 53.57853°N 2.05245°W	—	Late 18th century	The farmhouse is in stone on a projecting plinth, and has quoins and a stone-slate roof. It has two storeys, two bays, a right lean-to, and a two-storey rear wing. On the front is a 20th-century porch, and the windows are mullioned.	II
Intake Farmhouse and Cottage, Uppermill; 53.54833°N 1.99213°W	—	Late 18th century	A pair of stone cottages with quoins and a stone-slate roof. They have a single-depth plan, three storeys, one bay each, a single-storey wing to the left, and a porch to the right. Most of the windows are mullioned, with 20th-century windows and a bow window at the rear.	II
Ivy Cottage, Uppermill; 53.54546°N 1.99957°W	—	Late 18th century	A stone house with a rendered gable end and a stone-slate roof. It has three storeys, one bay, and a lean-to extension to the left. There is a doorway with a square head, the windows are mullioned, and at the rear is a small stair window.	II
Knarr Clough, Dobcross; 53.56028°N 2.03076°W	—	Late 18th century	A stone house with a stone-slate roof, a single-depth plan, three storeys and three bays, the right bay being later. The windows are mullioned, and there is a blocked doorway in the right gable end.	II
Knowle Top Farmhouse, Uppermill; 53.54162°N 1.99327°W		Late 18th century	The farmhouse, which incorporates earlier material, is in stone with quoins and a stone-slate roof. It has three storeys, three bays, and a lean-to extension on the right. There are two doorways on the front, and the windows are mullioned.	II
Lamb Lodge and Lamb Lodge Farm, Uppermill; 53.55199°N 1.98544°W	—	Late 18th century	A pair of stone houses, partly on a projecting plinth, with quoins and a stone-slate roof. They have a double-depth plan, three storeys, three bays, and a small lean-to extension at the rear. On the front is a gabled porch, and the windows are mullioned, including seven-light windows on the two upper floors on the front.	II
Lane Side, Dobcross; 53.55742°N 1.99752°W	—	Late 18th century	A stone house, incorporating earlier material, with a stone-slate roof. It has a single-depth plan, three storeys, two bays, and a lean-to extension at the rear. On the front is a 20th-century porch, and the windows, some of which are blocked, are mullioned.	II
Lode Clough, Uppermill; 53.55228°N 1.98602°W	—	Late 18th century	A stone house with quoins and a stone-slate roof. It has a single-depth plan, three storeys, two bays, and a continuous two-storey outshut at the rear. The windows are mullioned, and include windows of ten and eleven lights.	II
Low Bank, Denshaw; 53.58641°N 2.01248°W	—	Late 18th century	A stone house with a stone-slate roof and two storeys. Originally with two bays, three bays were added later. The original part has quoins, on the front is a conservatory, and the windows are mullioned.	II
Lower Brownhill House, Uppermill; 53.55358°N 2.00621°W	—	Late 18th century	A stone house with a stone-slate roof, partly with a single-depth plan, and partly with a double-depth plan, it has three storeys, two bays, and a small 20th-century extension. Most of the windows are mullioned, some have been replaced by sash windows, and there is a stair window. Also dating from the 20th century are a bay window and a conservatory.	II
Lower Tunstead Farmhouse, Greenfield; 53.53672°N 1.99533°W	—	Late 18th century	The farmhouse, which contains some earlier features, is in stone with quoins and a stone-slate roof. There are three storeys, with a former loom workshop on the top floor. On the front is a gabled porch with a triangular-headed lintel. The windows are mullioned, and external steps lead up to the workshop.	II
Manor Yard, Uppermill; 53.54864°N 2.00594°W	—	Late 18th century	A stone house with a slate roof, two storeys and one bay. In each floor is a seven-light mullioned window, and in the left gable end is a square-headed doorway, two blocked taking-in doors, and a blocked pigeon cote.	II
Marled Earth Farmhouse, Delph; 53.58133°N 2.03570°W	—	Late 18th century	A stone farmhouse, mainly rendered, with quoins and a stone-slate roof. It has a double-depth plan, two storeys, and two bays. On the front is a 20th-century porch, and the window are mullioned, including a twelve-light workshop window on the front and an eleven-light window at the rear. Attached to the left is a former barn with a dovecote in the gable.	II
Merestone Cottage, Austerlands; 53.54972°N 2.04277°W	—	Late 18th century	A house, later divided into two cottages, in stone with a stone-slate roof, a double-depth plan, two storeys, and two bays. There is a timber porch in each gable end, and the windows are mullioned.	II
Middle Carr Farmhouse, Diggle; 53.57338°N 1.99736°W	—	Late 18th century	A stone farmhouse with a stone-slate roof, a double-depth plan, three storeys, a later rear wing with two storeys, and a porch wing on the left. The windows are mullioned, and include a ten-light workshop window on the top floor.	II
Moorlands, Diggle; 53.58166°N 1.99459°W	—	Late 18th century	A stone house with quoins and a stone-slate roof. It has a double-depth plan, two storeys, two bays, and a small 20th-extension on the left. The windows are mullioned.	II
Moorlands Cottage, Diggle; 53.58171°N 1.99468°W	—	Late 18th century	A stone house with a stone-slate roof, a double-depth plan, and two storeys. It has a central entrance with a porch, and the windows are mullioned, including windows with ten and twelve lights.	II
Moorview (Running Hill Boarding Kennels), Dobcross; 53.55864°N 1.98479°W	—	Late 18th century	A stone house that has a stone-slate roof with coped gables. There is a double-depth plan, three storeys, three bays, and a 20th-century extension to the right. In the original part are two doorways in the left gable end, mullioned windows on the front, and a taking-in door in the right gable.	II
Morley and Morley Cottage, Greenfield; 53.53919°N 1.99509°W	—	Late 18th century	The house and cottage are in stone with quoins and a stone-slate roof. The house has three storeys, one bay, and a 20th-century lean-to the left. To the right is a 19th-century two-storey extension, which forms the cottage. On the front is a 20th-century porch, and the windows are mullioned.	II
Mount Sorrell Farmhouse, barn and cottage, Dobcross; 53.55231°N 2.02477°W	—	Late 18th century	The barn and cottage were added to the farmhouse in the 19th century. The buildings are in stone with roofs of slate and stone-slate. The farmhouse has two storeys, three bays, and a later projecting wing to the front on the right. It has a doorway with a square head and mullioned windows. The barn to the right has an elliptical-headed cart entrance at the front, a winnowing door at the rear, and a shippon door. Further to the right the cottage has one bay and contains casement windows.	II
Netherfield, Dobcross; 53.55468°N 2.01621°W	—	Late 18th century	A stone house on a projecting plinth with a stone-slate roof. It has a single-depth plan, two storeys, three bays, and a 20th-century rear extension. There is a central doorway and two five-light mullioned windows in each floor. In the gable ends are blocked windows and taking-in doors.	II
Oldfield Cottage and barn, Delph; 53.57996°N 2.04076°W	—	Late 18th century	The house and barn are in stone with a stone-slate roof. The house has a double-range plan, and two storeys. The entrance front is gabled and has a door with a fanlight. The southern range has shaped eaves gutter brackets, and the windows are mullioned. The barn is a continuation of the southern range, and contains a cart entrance and shippon doors.	II
Outbuilding west of View Banks, Diggle; 53.58186°N 1.99494°W	—	Late 18th century	The outbuilding originated as a house. It is in stone with a stone-slate roof, and has two storeys with a basement, and one bay. It contains a cart entry, and the windows were originally mullioned; some mullions have been removed, some are blocked, and there is a round-headed window.	II
Palinwood House, Delph; 53.57152°N 2.01728°W	—	Late 18th century	A stone house with quoins and a stone-slate roof. It has a double depth plan, three storeys with an attic, a lean-to the left, and a two-storey wing to the right. The windows are mullioned, and external steps lead up to a doorway on the middle floor.	II
Prestbury Cottage, Diggle; 53.56901°N 1.98747°W	—	Late 18th century	A house and a cottage in stone with stone-slate roofs. The house has a double-depth plan, three storeys and two bays, and mullioned windows. The cottage to the right has two storeys, two bays, a 20th-century porch, and a lean-to on the right.	II
Primrose Hill Farmhouse, Uppermill; 53.55124°N 1.98605°W		Late 18th century	A stone farmhouse with an incorporated former shippon. It has rendered gables, quoins, a double-depth plan, two storeys and three bays. On the front are two blocked doorways and a barn door, and the windows are mullioned.	II
Ravenstones, Dobcross; 53.55874°N 1.98600°W	—	Late 18th century	A stone house with a stone-slate roof, it has a single-depth plan, two storeys, two bays, and a recessed wing to the left with a 20th-century extension in the angle. The windows are mullioned, including an eight-light workshop window on the upper floor.	II
Red Lane Farmhouse, Diggle; 53.57399°N 1.99776°W	—	Late 18th century	A stone farmhouse on a projecting plinth, rendered at the rear, with a stone-slate roof, a double-depth plan, two storeys, and a square-headed doorway in the left gable end. The windows are mullioned, and include an eight-light workshop window on the upper floor. In the right gable end is a blocked taking-in door.	II
Ridge Farmhouse and barn, Diggle; 53.57456°N 1.98969°W	—	Late 18th century	The farmhouse and barn are in stone with stone-slate roofs. The house has quoins, a double-depth plan, two storeys, two bays, and a lean-to on the gable end. There are 20th-century porches on the front and rear, and the windows are mullioned, including a 14-light workshop window on the upper floor. The barn is recessed to the left, and contains an arched cart entrance.	II
Running Hill Cottage, Dobcross; 53.55856°N 1.98737°W	—	Late 18th century	A stone house on a projecting plinth, with quoins and a stone-slate roof. It has a single-depth plan, two storeys, three bays, a rear wing, and a porch in the left gable end. Most of the windows are mullioned, including an eight-light workshop window on the upper floor. The right bay has been rebuilt to incorporate a garage.	II
Running Hill House and Farmhouse, Dobcross; 53.55905°N 1.98557°W	—	Late 18th century	Originally a farmhouse, later divided into two houses, it is in stone with quoins and a stone-slate roof. It has a single-depth plan, two storeys and four bays. The first bay is recessed with a lean-to extension on the front. In the third bay is a doorway, and the windows are mullioned.	II
Ryefields and Ryefields Cottage, Uppermill; 53.55517°N 2.00042°W		Late 18th century	The house and cottage are in stone with stone-slate roofs, and have a double-depth plan, three storeys, six bays, and a later rear wing. The cottage is later and has a porch with a four-centred arched doorway and a coped gable. In the gable end is a doorway with a rusticated surround, and on the front are mullioned windows and an altered window. The house has a similar porch, a canted bay window to the left and a rectangular bay window to the right. On the upper floors are mullioned windows, and at the top is an eaves band, gablets with niches, and a coped parapet. At the rear are mullioned windows, one with eleven lights, and two blocked taking-in doors.	II
Sandbed Farmhouse and barn, Delph; 53.57195°N 2.01469°W	—	Late 18th century	Originally a farmhouse and barn, with the farmhouse divided into two houses. The building is in stone with quoins and a slate roof. The former farmhouse has three storeys and three bays, with a wing and barn at right angles to the rear. On the front is a 20th-century porch, and the windows are mullioned. In the barn is a segmental-arched cart entry with a keystone, shippon doors and ventilation slits.	II
Slades Barn, Uppermill; 53.55441°N 1.97821°W	—	Late 18th century	A stone farmhouse with quoins and a stone-slate roof. It has a double-depth plan, two storeys and two bays. The doorway has a square head, and the windows are mullioned. At the rear are a blocked doorway and a taking-in door.	II
Spring Head Farmhouse, Delph; 53.57926°N 2.03094°W	—	Late 18th century	The farmhouse is in stone with a slate roof. It has a single-depth plan, three storeys, two bays, and a lean-to extension at the left. The doorway at the rear has a square head, and the windows are mullioned.	II
Springfield Farmhouse and barn, Greenfield; 53.53221°N 2.00799°W	—	Late 18th century	The farmhouse and barn are in stone with a stone-slate roof. The house has three storeys and three bays, and a flat-roofed 20th-century extension to the rear. On the front is a blocked doorway and a door with a keystone lintel, and the windows are mullioned. The barn to the left has a segmental-headed entry, a winnowing door, and a shippon door.	II
Stoneby Cottage and Boarshurst Cottage, Greenfield; 53.53606°N 2.00038°W	—	Late 18th century	A pair of stone houses with a stone-slate roof, a single-depth plan, three storeys, and one bay each. On the front is a 20th-century porch, and there are three 20th-century openings, the other windows being mullioned, with a six-light window in each floor.	II
Sunny Bank, Grotton; 53.53324°N 2.05039°W	—	Late 18th century	A brick house with stone dressings, a stone-slate roof, and a rendered right gable. It has a double-depth plan, two storeys with an attic, a single bay, and lean-to extensions to the right and at the rear. Above the door is a fanlight, and the windows are mullioned.	II
The Hare and Hounds public house, Uppermill; 53.54794°N 2.00579°W		Late 18th century	The public house is in stone with quoins, shaped eaves gutter brackets, and a stone-slate roof. It has a double-depth plan, three storeys, and a symmetrical front of three bays. The central doorway has a moulded surround, and the windows are mullioned. In the gable end are blocked windows and a taking-in door.	II
The Outpost, Diggle; 53.57124°N 1.97826°W	—	Late 18th century	The house was later extended to the right. It is in stone on a plinth with quoins, the extension is pebbledashed, and the roof is in stone-slate. There is a double-depth plan, three storeys, a continuous outshut at the rear, a porch wing to the right, and the windows are mullioned.	II
Thurstons, Diggle; 53.57679°N 1.98850°W	—	Late 18th century	A stone house with a stone-slate roof, a single-depth plan, two storeys, two bays, and a lean-to on each side. The door is in the left lean-to, and the windows are mullioned.	II
Top o'th'Fold, Denshaw; 53.58354°N 2.04939°W	—	Late 18th century	A row of three stone houses with a rendered left gable and a stone-slate roof. They have a double-depth plan, two storeys and three bays, and the windows are mullioned, other than two inserted 20th-century windows.	II
Valenciennes Farmhouse, cottage and barn, Dobcross; 53.56116°N 2.03546°W	—	Late 18th century	The farmhouse, cottage and barn are in stone with a stone-slate roof, and are in a single range. They have two storeys and three bays. The house and cottage have square-headed doorways and mullioned windows, blocked windows in the gable, and a taking-in door at the rear. In the barn are a segmental-headed cart entrance and a winnowing door.	II
View Banks, Diggle; 53.58182°N 1.99486°W	—	Late 18th century	A stone house with a stone-slate roof, two storeys with a basement, and two bays. There is a central doorway, and the windows are mullioned.	II
Waterside Cottage, Diggle; 53.56772°N 1.98822°W	—	Late 18th century	A house that was refurbished in 1973, it is in stone with quoins, and has a stone-slate roof. There is a single-depth plan, three storeys, one bay, and a later rear wing. It has a modern porch, and the windows are mullioned. In the rear wing is a garage door.	II
Well Head House and barn, Delph; 53.57832°N 2.03065°W	—	Late 18th century	The house and barn are in stone with a stone-slate roof. The house has quoins, a single-depth plan, two storeys, three bays, and an outshut to the rear on the right. The windows are mullioned, including a twelve-light window on the upper floor. The barn to the left has large door on the front with a corbelled lintel, and there are two doors at the rear.	II
White Spring Head Farmhouse, Uppermill; 53.54672°N 1.99061°W	—	Late 18th century	The farmhouse is in stone with a stone-slate roof, a single-depth plan, two storeys and two bays. There is a small barn to the left and a 20th-century garage to the right. On the front is a 20th-century porch, and the windows are mullioned.	II
Wind Whistle Farmhouse and cottages, Greenfield; 53.52638°N 2.01712°W	—	Late 18th century	Originally a farmhouse with an attached barn, the barns have been converted into cottages. The building is in stone with a slate roof. The former farmhouse has a projecting plinth and quoins, two storeys, and two bays. It has a central doorway and mullioned windows, including a 13-light workshop window on the upper floor. In the former barn is a blocked cart entry with a keystone, inserted doorways, and a blocked taking-in door at the rear.	II
Woods House, Dobcross; 53.55593°N 2.01313°W	—	Late 18th century	The house, which has been divided into two dwellings, is in stone with quoins, an eaves cornice, and a stone-slate roof. It has three storeys with attics and cellars, and three bays with an additional bay to the right. On the front are two porches. Most of the windows are mullioned, including a six-light workshop windows at the rear, and there are some replacement sash windows.	II
38 King Street and 1 and 2 Bridge End, Delph; 53.56819°N 2.02364°W	—	1776	Three stone houses, partly pebbledashed, with quoins and a stone-slate roof. They have three storeys and three bays. The windows are mullioned, and there is a taking-in door on the middle floor. No. 38 King Street is approached by steps in the gable end.	II
2, 4 and 8 Sandy Lane, Dobcross; 53.55654°N 2.01321°W		1780	Three stone houses with quoins, a modillion eaves cornice, and a stone-slate roof. They have a double-depth plan, three storeys and four bays. The windows are mullioned.	II
The Old Vicarage, Greenfield; 53.53470°N 1.99250°W	—	1780	A stone house on a projecting plinth, with quoins and shaped eaves gutter brackets. It has a single-depth plan, three storeys, three bays, and a small rear wing. There is a central doorway with a chamfered surround and a fanlight. The windows are mullioned, and at the rear is a blocked taking-in door.	II
21, 23 and 25 Clough Lane, Grasscroft; 53.53778°N 2.03193°W	—	1781	Three houses, partly from later dates, in stone with a 20th-century tiled roof. The main part has three bays and three storeys, with a recessed lower two-storey bay to the left. The windows are mullioned, and at the rear are two taking-in doors.	II
Shore Mill, Delph; 53.56812°N 2.02257°W	—	Early 1780s	A former water-powered carding mill, it is in stone with a stone-slate roof and three storeys. The windows are mullioned, there are taking-in doors in the gable ends, and at the rear is a blocked arched mill leat.	II*
Carr Head Cottage, Diggle; 53.57700°N 1.99794°W	—	1784	A stone house with quoins and a stone-slate roof. There are two storeys, two bays, and a 20th-century lean-to extension to the rear. The windows are mullioned, and in the left gable end is a doorway with a dated lintel.	II
Nebo Farmhouse and barn, Austerlands; 53.55567°N 2.05102°W	—	1780s	The farmhouse and the barn to the right are in stone, the house has a stone-slate roof with coped gables, and the barn a roof of corrugated sheet. The house has a single-depth plan, two storeys and two bays. On the front is a lean-to porch, and the windows are mullioned. The barn has a cart entry and a shippon door.	II
St Anne's Church, Lydgate; 53.53551°N 2.04234°W		1787–88	The church was later remodelled, the chancel in 1888, the vestry in 1911, and the tower in about 1920. The church is built in stone and has a slate roof with coped gables. It consists of a nave on a projecting plinth, a chancel, and a southwest tower. The tower has four stages, angle buttresses, round-headed openings with keystones, and an embattled parapet with a niche in each face. The nave has a sill band, an eaves cornice, pilasters, and it contains round-headed windows with impost blocks and keystones. The east window is in Venetian style.	II
Holy Trinity Church, Dobcross; 53.55536°N 2.01469°W	—	1788	The tower was added in 1843. The church is in stone with a slate roof, and consists of a nave, a short chancel, and a west tower. The nave has a plinth, quoins, an eaves cornice, and two tiers of round-headed windows along the sides. At the east end is a Venetian window. The tower is flanked by porches with swept coped parapets with ball finials. It has three stages, the top stage being Italianate in style with arcades, clock faces and a shallow pyramidal roof.	II
The Brun, Diggle; 53.57912°N 1.98331°W	—	1790	A stone house on a projecting plinth, with a slate roof. It has quoins, a single-depth plan, two storeys, three bays, and 20th-century extensions to the right and the rear. The central doorway has a square head, the windows are mullioned, and in the left gable is a dated lintel over a window that was originally a doorway.	II
Dean Head Farm and cottage 53.58196°N 1.98796°W	—	c. 1790	The house and the cottage, which dates from the early 19th century, are in stone with a stone-slate roof. The house has quoins, a double-depth plan three storeys, two bays, and a one-storey extension to the right. The cottage to the left has single-depth plan and three storeys. All the windows are mullioned.	II
Throstle's Nest, Grasscroft; 53.53659°N 2.02881°W	—	1791	Originally a water-powered mill, later converted into a private house, it is in stone with a slate roof. The house has three storeys, 20th-century lean-to extensions to the left and the rear, and a two-storey extension to the right. The windows are mullioned.	II
70 Denshaw Road, Delph; 53.57138°N 2.03323°W	—	1793	A stone house on a projecting plinth, with quoins, a band, a modillion eaves cornice, and a stone-slate roof. It has a double-depth plan, three storeys, a symmetrical main block of three bays, and a two-storey wing to the left containing a garage. The central doorway has a block surround, a keystone, a pulvinated frieze, and a pediment. The windows on the front are sashes with architraves, and at the rear are mullioned windows.	II
Division Bridge, Grasscroft; 53.52992°N 2.03017°W		1794–1799	This is bridge No. 85, a roving bridge that carries Calf Lane over the Huddersfield Narrow Canal. It is in stone, and consists of an elliptical-headed skew arch. It has a band, curved parapet walls with round-topped coping stones, and terminal square piers.	II
Lock No. 22W (Dunge Booth lock), Uppermill; 53.55156°N 2.00772°W		1794–1799	The lock on the Huddersfield Narrow Canal is in stone, and has a single upper and double lower gates. A boatman's ladder has been installed in the lock wall.	II
Lock No. 23, Tailbridge No. 75 and Aqueduct No. 74, Dobcross; 53.55343°N 2.00829°W		1794–1799	The lock, bridge, and aqueduct over the River Tame are stone structures on the Huddersfield Narrow Canal. The lock has a single upper and double lower gates, and the bridge has an elliptical arch, a parapet with a band, round-topped copings, and a square terminal pier. The aqueduct has a skew arch-elliptical arch and square piers.	II
Milestone, Grasscroft; 53.53494°N 2.02256°W	—	1794–1799	The milestone is on the towpath of the Huddersfield Narrow Canal. It is in stone, and consists of a rectangular post with a curved head and a round indented face inscribed with "14".	II
11 and 9 (part) Crib Lane, Dobcross; 53.55868°N 2.01373°W	—	1790s	Two houses in stone with quoins to the right and a stone-slate roof. There are two storeys and two bays, with a porch wing added to the right. The windows are mullioned.	II
Golburn Cottage, Uppermill; 53.54184°N 1.99838°W		1790s	A stone house with quoins and a slate roof. It has a single-depth plan, three storeys, one bay, and a later two-bay barn extension to the right that has been converted for residential use. The original part has mullioned windows, and in the barn conversion are 20th-century windows.	II
Uppermill Conservative Club; 53.54864°N 2.00568°W	—	1790s	Originally a house, later a club, it is in stone on a projecting plinth, with rusticated quoins, an eaves cornice, and a slate roof. It has a double-range plan, two storeys, three bays, and a later rear range with extensions. Most of the windows are mullioned, and in the rear range is a round-headed stair window.	II
White Hart public house, Lydgate; 53.53585°N 2.04147°W		1790s	A private house, later a public house, it is in stone with a stone-slate roof. There is a double-depth plan, three storeys, three bays, an additional bay to the left, and a lean-to extension at the rear. The windows on the front are a mix of sashes and casements, and in the rear extension the windows are mullioned.	II
Aqueduct No. 84, Grasscroft; 53.53064°N 2.02970°W		1797	The aqueduct carries the Huddersfield Narrow Canal over the River Tame. It is in stone, and consists of two segmental-headed skew arches. The aqueduct has two bands, a parapet on the towpath side with round-topped coping stones, and terminal square piers.	II
Springwood House, Delph; 53.56995°N 2.02480°W	—	1797	A stone house on a projecting plinth, with quoins, an eaves cornice, a blocking course, and a stone-slate roof. It has a double-depth plan, two storeys with an attic, three bays, and a lean-to on the right. Steps with railings lead up to a central doorway with a fanlight, a keystone, and an archivolt. The windows are sashes, and there is a semicircular blocked attic window and a rear stair window, both with impost blocks, and a keystone. At the rear is a castellated porch.	II
Royal George Canal Bridge, Greenfield; 53.53369°N 2.02683°W		1798	The bridge carries a road over the Huddersfield Narrow Canal, and it was strengthened probably in the 1830s with addition of cast iron girders. The rest of the bridge is in millstone grit, and spans the canal and the towpath. There is a subsidiary arch providing an outlet for a stream.	II
St Chad's House, Uppermill; 53.54811°N 2.00644°W		1798	Originally a house, later a library, with the façade added in the mid-19th century. It is in stone on a projecting plinth, with quoins, sill bands, an eaves cornice, and a stone-slate roof. There are two storeys and a symmetrical front of five gabled bays, the gables in the outer bays being larger and coped with finials. The central doorway has a moulded surround, a carved overpanel, and a moulded hood. The windows are mullioned and transomed, or mullioned, and some of the door lintels have been re-used.	II
6 and 8 Wall Hill Road, Dobcross; 53.55409°N 2.02015°W	—	1799	Originally one house, later divided into two, it is in stone with quoins and a stone-slate roof. There is a double-depth plan, two storeys, each house has one bay, and there is a later range at the rear. The windows are mullioned.	II
Canal Lock near Ward Lane, Diggle; 53.56482°N 1.99701°W		1799–1810	This is lock No. 31 on the Huddersfield Narrow Canal, and was restored in 1991. The lock basin is in stone, and the tail beam and head gate are in wood, both with cast iron ground paddle gearings. At the tail is a wooden footbridge and steps leading down to ground level.	II

== See also ==
- Listed buildings in Saddleworth from 1800
