= Grotton Hall =

Listed building in Lydgate, Greater Manchester, England

- Location within Greater Manchester

General information
- Location: Platting Road, Lydgate, Greater Manchester, England
- Coordinates: 53.5403°N 2.0437°W
- Year built: 1686; 340 years ago
- Renovated: 1844 (restored)

Listed Building – Grade II*
- Official name: Grotton Hall
- Designated: 3 July 1986
- Reference no.: 1068157

Listed Building – Grade II
- Official name: Cottage and barn to south of Grotton Hall
- Designated: 19 June 1967
- Reference no.: 1068158

Grotton Hall is a Grade II* listed 17th-century manor house on Platting Road in Lydgate, a village near Saddleworth in the Metropolitan Borough of Oldham, Greater Manchester, England. Bearing datestones from 1645 and 1686, it developed as a farmstead associated with the Buckley family, prominent local landowners who rebuilt and altered the property over several centuries. The present form largely reflects a major restoration in 1844 by Edmund Buckley, later MP for Newcastle-under-Lyme. Sold out of the family in 1876 and auctioned in 1921, the hall remains a private residence.

== History ==
The origins of Grotton Hall date back to the 17th century, with the earliest stone on the site dated 1645 and the house itself bearing the date 1686, suggesting its construction thereafter. Initially functioning as a working farm connected to a monastery, the property became associated with the Buckley family, prominent local landowners, for several centuries. In 1656 John Buckley rebuilt part of the house, as indicated by the initials "J.B." and the date carved above the porch lintel. Additional datestones include "IBM 1686" (Isaac and Mary Buckley), "IBK 1725," "EB 1844," and "1984," marking later phases of alteration.

Much of the present structure reflects the major restoration carried out in 1844 by Edmund Buckley, who later served as the MP for Newcastle-under-Lyme. His son, Sir Edmund Buckley, inherited the estate in 1864 but sold it following bankruptcy in 1876. The hall was eventually auctioned in 1921 and remains a private residence today.

On 3 July 1986, Grotton Hall was designated a Grade II* listed building.

== Architecture ==
Grotton Hall is an example of vernacular, Tudor-period domestic architecture, noted for its simple and traditional design. The building is constructed from watershot hammer-dressed stone and has a graduated stone slate roof. It comprises five bays, two storeys, and a projecting plinth.

The exterior features include a porch with an ovolo-moulded surround, a dated lintel, and raked castellations with ball finials. The windows are double-chamfered mullioned types with hood moulds and upturned stops. The coped gables are finished with ball finials and incorporate circular stone-dressed openings.

=== Interior ===
Internally, Grotton Hall retains many original details. The south-east room contains wood panelling and a chimney-piece decorated with carved faces, swags, and side columns. The principal room retains ovolo-moulded ceiling beams with stepped stops, including a bressummer beam positioned over an inglenook fireplace. The fireplace has been modified with a later stone hearth and features an obtuse-angled lintel with recessed spandrels.

== Associated structure ==
To the south of Grotton Hall stands a Grade II listed barn and adjoining cottage. The barn, reputed to be a former tithe barn, dates from the 17th century, while the cottage is primarily 18th century with later alterations. The barn is built of squared rubble with a slate roof and features a projecting plinth, quoins, ventilation slits at two levels, and a blocked doorway with a chamfered jamb, opposed by a cart entry at the rear. Internally, it retains an inclined strut truss with a massive forked tie-beam supported by a forked post. A small shippon adjoins the rear, incorporating an oeil-de-boeuf window and coped gables. The cottage, constructed of hammer-dressed stone with a graduated stone slate roof, has a central doorway with a chamfered surround and altered mullioned windows.

== See also ==
- Grade II* listed buildings in Greater Manchester
- Listed buildings in Saddleworth to 1800
