= White Hart, Lydgate =

Listed pub in Greater Manchester, England

White Hart
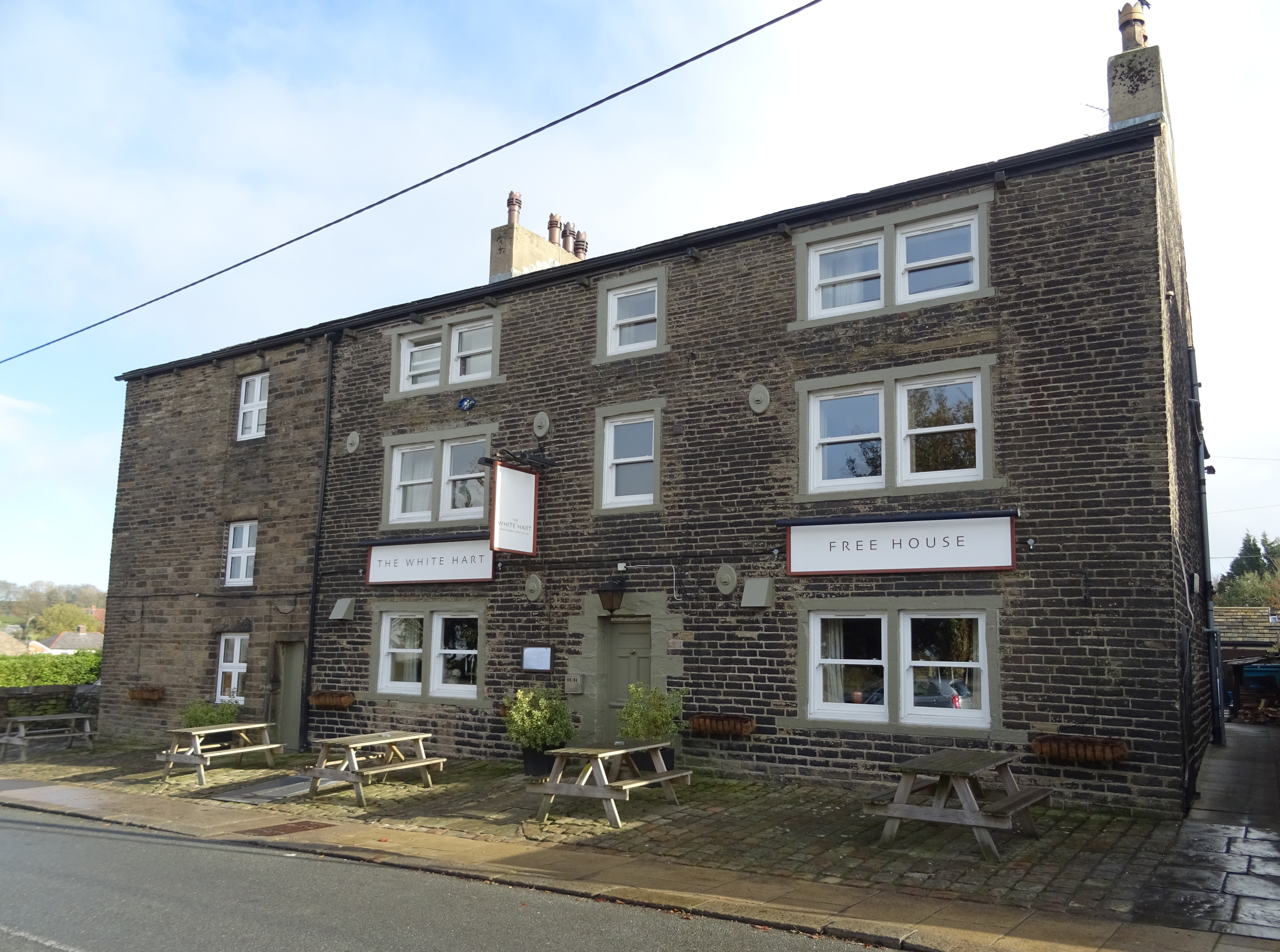
- The pub in 2018

- Location within Greater Manchester
- Alternative names: White Hart Inn

General information
- Type: Public house; originally a house
- Location: 51 Stockport Road, Lydgate, Greater Manchester, England
- Coordinates: 53.5359°N 2.0415°W
- Year built: 1790s (possibly 1788)

Design and construction
- Designations

Listed Building – Grade II
- Official name: White Hart public house
- Designated: 18 February 1987
- Reference no.: 1356426

Website
- thewhitehart.co.uk

The White Hart is a Grade II listed public house on Stockport Road in Lydgate, a village in Saddleworth within the Metropolitan Borough of Oldham, Greater Manchester, England. Built in the 1790s, although some sources give a more precise date of 1788, it was originally a house and may have served as a weavers' cottage before its later conversion to a pub. It is also recorded as having operated at one stage as a police station with a small jail. The building now operates as a free house with dining, function rooms and guest accommodation.

== History ==
The official listing states that the building dates from the 1790s and was originally a house, (Note: Other sources give a construction date of 1788.) a use that may correspond with later references to it functioning as a weavers' cottage, before its subsequent conversion to a public house. It incorporates later additions and is recorded as having operated at one stage as a police station with a jail, and as a schoolhouse, as well as serving as a lookout point during the Second World War.

The 1894 Ordnance Survey map records the building as the White Hart Inn, and by the 1935 edition its name includes the term 'public house'.

On 18 February 1987, the White Hart was designated a Grade II listed building. The pub now operates as a multi‑room free house with a restaurant, function rooms and overnight accommodation.

== Architecture ==
The building is constructed from roughly finished stone and has a roof of stone slates laid in graded courses. It has three storeys and three bays, with an extra bay added on the left side and a lean‑to structure at the back. The front is arranged symmetrically, with a central doorway framed in worked stone and single windows above it on the upper floors, now fitted with 20th‑century casements. The outer sections each have paired windows on all floors, also replaced in the 20th century. The guttering sits on small projecting blocks, and the gable‑end chimneys are coated in render.

The rear addition includes a doorway with a simple square‑cut frame and a window opening on each level, two of which have been filled in. On either side of the lean‑to at the back are recessed stone‑framed windows with multiple lights; one has been blocked and another altered. The arrangement of the windows on the main front is an early local example of this particular layout.

== See also ==
- Listed buildings in Saddleworth to 1800
- Listed pubs in Greater Manchester
