= Hare and Hounds, Uppermill =

Listed pub in Greater Manchester, England

Hare and Hounds
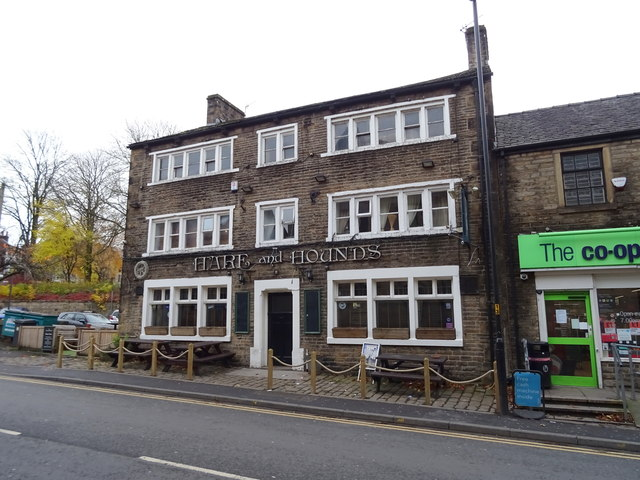
- The pub in 2018

- Location within Greater Manchester

General information
- Type: Public house
- Location: 68 High Street, Uppermill, Greater Manchester, England
- Coordinates: 53.5479°N 2.0058°W
- Year built: Late 18th century
- Owner: Punch Taverns

Design and construction
- Designations

Listed Building – Grade II
- Official name: The Hare and Hounds public house
- Designated: 3 July 1986
- Reference no.: 1356716

The Hare and Hounds is a Grade II listed public house on High Street in Uppermill, a village within the Metropolitan Borough of Oldham, Greater Manchester, England. Built in the late 18th century, it has remained a presence in the village centre for more than two hundred years.

== History ==
The building was constructed in the late 18th century, according to its official listing. The 1893 and 1945 Ordnance Survey maps mark the building as an inn, although no name is shown.

On 3 July 1986, the Hare and Hounds was designated a Grade II listed building. As of 2023, the pub is owned by Punch Taverns.

== Architecture ==
The building is constructed of dressed stone and has a roof of stone slates laid in graded courses. It has three storeys, three bays, and a plan that extends back from the frontage. The main entrance sits in the centre, with 19th‑century stone‑framed windows on either side. The upper floors each have three windows: two wider ones and a narrower one in the middle. There are shaped brackets at the eaves, corner stones at the edges, and chimneys on the gable ends. Some openings in the gable have been filled in, including a former loading doorway. The rear elevation has windows of a similar style, though part of it is hidden by a later single‑storey brick addition with a flat roof.

== See also ==
- Listed buildings in Saddleworth to 1800
- Listed pubs in Greater Manchester
