= White Lion, Delph =

Listed pub in Greater Manchester, England

White Lion
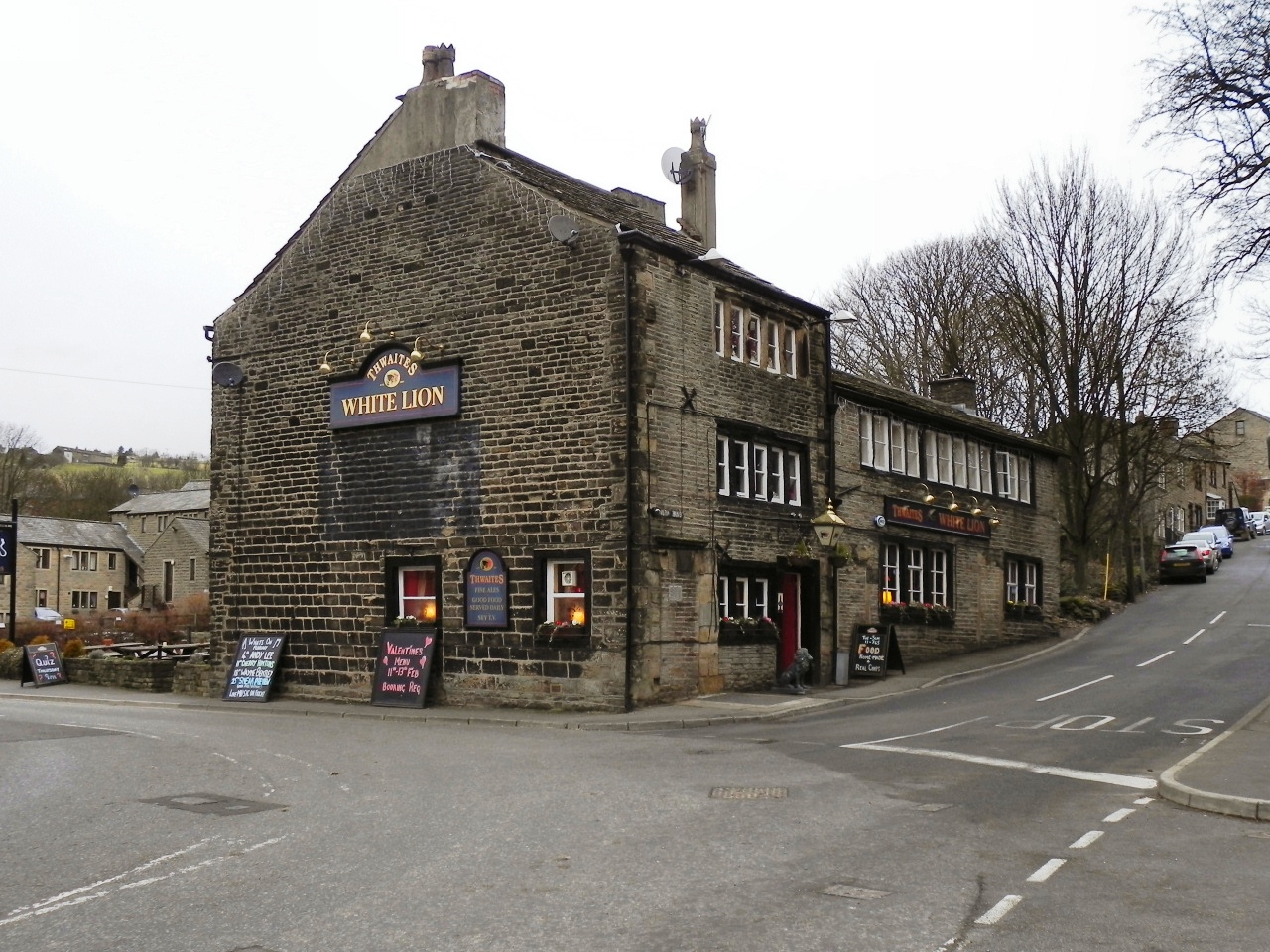
- The pub in 2011

- Location within Greater Manchester

General information
- Type: Public house
- Location: 1 Delph Lane, Delph, Greater Manchester, England
- Coordinates: 53.5691°N 2.0235°W
- Year built: Mid to late 18th century
- Renovated: 2014
- Owner: Thwaites

Design and construction
- Designations

Listed Building – Grade II
- Official name: White Lion public house
- Designated: 3 July 1986
- Reference no.: 1356724

Website
- whiteliondelph.co.uk

The White Lion is a Grade II listed public house on Delph Lane in Delph, a village in Saddleworth within the Metropolitan Borough of Oldham, Greater Manchester, England. Built in the mid to late 18th century, it originated as three separate houses and was in use as an inn by the late 19th century. It underwent a major refurbishment in 2014, and is now owned by Thwaites Brewery.

== History ==
The building was constructed in the mid to late 18th century as three separate houses, according to its official listing. The 1894 Ordnance Survey map records it as an inn, with no accompanying name.

From 1965 to 1990, the pub was run by former West Indian cricketer Sonny Ramadhin and his wife, following his retirement and move to Delph. On 3 July 1986, the White Lion was designated a Grade II listed building.

A full refurbishment of the pub was carried out in January 2014, introducing new flooring, carpeting, a reworked dining space and a wood‑burning stove. As of May 2026, it is owned by Thwaites Brewery.

== Architecture ==
The building is constructed in dressed stone with a roof of stone slates laid in graded courses. The main element is of three storeys, one bay wide, and built to a double-depth plan. To its right, two smaller cottages were later added; each was originally a narrow, two‑storey unit built to a single-depth plan.

The left-hand section has a former doorway that has been filled in, and a later doorway set to the right. Its ground floor has a three‑pane window, with wider five‑pane windows on the two upper floors. The corners are strengthened with dressed stone, and there are chimneys on the gable ends.

The later cottages have their original doorways blocked, with two and three‑pane windows on the ground floor and a larger 12‑pane workshop window above. Their windows have plain stone surrounds. A 20th‑century extension covers the rear of the cottages, while the main house still has a mix of two, three and six‑pane stone‑mullioned windows at the back.

== See also ==
- Listed buildings in Saddleworth to 1800
- Listed pubs in Greater Manchester
