= Cross Keys Inn, Uppermill =

Listed pub in Greater Manchester, England

Cross Keys Inn
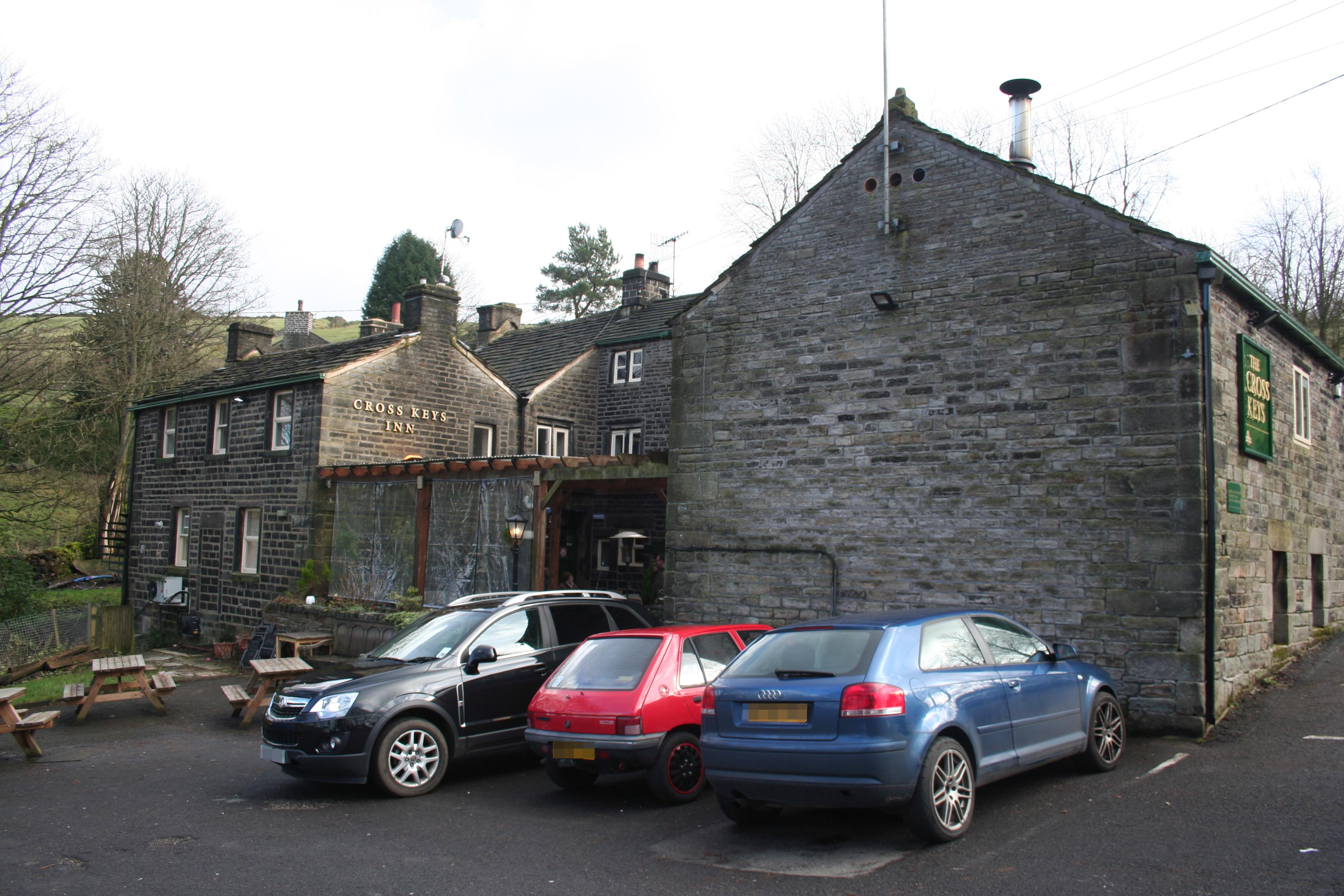
- The pub in 2014

- Location within Greater Manchester
- Former names: The Gravemakers
- Alternative names: Cross Keys

General information
- Type: Public house
- Location: Running Hill Gate, Uppermill, Greater Manchester, England
- Coordinates: 53.5530°N 1.9889°W
- Year built: 1745; 281 years ago
- Renovated: 19th century (extended)
- Owner: J. W. Lees

Design and construction
- Designations

Listed Building – Grade II
- Official name: Cross Keys public house
- Designated: 19 June 1967
- Reference no.: 1356384

Website
- crosskeysinn.pub

The Cross Keys Inn is a Grade II listed public house on Running Hill Gate in Uppermill, a village in Saddleworth within the Metropolitan Borough of Oldham, Greater Manchester, England. Built in 1745 and first opened as an inn in 1763, it was formerly known as The Gravemakers. By the late 2010s it was operating as a J. W. Lees tenancy.

== History ==
The inscription "MB SB 1745" on the door lintel, referring to a Michael Bottomley, is taken to mark the building's construction in 1745, and a 19th‑century addition stands to the rear. It is recorded as having first opened as an inn in 1763. The establishment was formerly known as The Gravemakers, a name linked to its earlier use as a mortuary. The 1892 Ordnance Survey map marks the building as the Cross Keys Inn.

On 19 June 1967, the Cross Keys was designated a Grade II listed building.

By the late 2010s, local newspaper reports show that the Cross Keys Inn was being operated as a J. W. Lees tenancy. In 2026 it was reported that the pub had appeared in CAMRA's Good Beer Guide 46 times across the preceding half‑century.

== Architecture ==
The building is constructed of roughly finished stone and has a stone-slate roof with courses that decrease in size up the slope. It has three bays in a single row, with some parts rising to three storeys and others to two. A later extension was added behind the second and third bays. The corners are reinforced with dressed stone.

In the first bay there is a 20th-century window with a doorway beside it. The third bay contains a blocked former doorway with a shaped stone surround, next to a later doorway with a plain surround. The ground floor has sets of four and two‑part stone‑framed windows, the smaller set missing its central support. The upper floor has similar four and five‑part windows, some retaining old leaded glass. Three chimney stacks stand along the roof ridge. At the rear there are further two, three and four‑part windows of the same type, along with another doorway framed in shaped stone.

The interior features exposed beams throughout, and the public bar includes a range and a stone‑paved floor.

== See also ==
- Listed buildings in Saddleworth to 1800
- Listed pubs in Greater Manchester
