= Shore Mill =

Listed building in Delph, Greater Manchester, England

- Location within Greater Manchester

General information
- Location: Lawton Square, Delph, Greater Manchester, England
- Coordinates: 53.5681°N 2.0225°W
- Year built: Early 1780s

Listed Building – Grade II*
- Official name: Shore Mill
- Designated: 3 July 1986
- Reference no.: 1067445

Shore Mill is a Grade II* listed former water-powered textile mill on Lawton Square in Delph, a village in the civil parish of Saddleworth, within the Metropolitan Borough of Oldham, Greater Manchester, England. Historically within the West Riding of Yorkshire, the building dates from the early 1780s and represents one of the earliest examples of a water-powered mill built for the factory system while retaining vernacular architectural features. It has since been converted into a residential dwelling.

== History ==
The earliest reference to Shore Mill appears in a deed dated July 1782, which records its construction on land owned by the Whitehead family of Delph. Initially known as a 'willey mill', it was used for teasing raw wool prior to carding. In 1784 Joseph Lawton and Thomas Buckley acquired a partial ownership stake in the mill. Cotton spinning may have begun at Shore Mill around this time, although it is not mentioned in Buckley's will of 1785.

The first confirmed reference to cotton production dates to 1788, when a deed described the "Shore Engine" as "a cotton mill or engine" occupied by James and John Buckley, who also operated Gatehead Mill. By 1802 the mill was worked by James Lawton and Robert Mellor, still as a cotton mill, and later deeds from 1807 and 1809 list Mellor as the occupier. By 1815 Edmund Buckley, a cotton spinner also active in the woollen industry at Rasping and Lumb Mills, was in occupation. He remained there until 1835, after which the mill returned to wool processing, functioning as a scribbling mill under Robert Hastings. It was closely linked to nearby mills such as Rasping Mill, sharing water resources from the River Tame.

After its industrial use, the building was converted into residential accommodation.

On 3 July 1986, Shore Mill was designated a Grade II* listed building.

== Architecture ==
Shore Mill is a three-storey structure built from hammer-dressed stone with a graduated stone slate roof. Originally fitted with an overshot waterwheel, it was later reconstructed as an undershot wheel, which remains centrally positioned. The front elevation features two blocked doorways, now converted to windows, flanking a later doorway and two two-light windows that were once part of a longer row. The upper floors display distinctive 12-light mullioned windows, with every third mullion serving as a king mullion; all mullions are flat-faced and recessed.

Additional architectural details include a gable stack and taking-in doors to the gables. At the rear, the building retains a blocked arched mill leat opening, along with ground-floor windows of four and three lights, two five-light windows on the first floor, and a 12-light window on the second floor.

=== Interior ===
Internally, the timber beam single-span floors incorporate a late 19th-century pre-stressing system using wrought-iron tie rods to support increased loading. The mill was originally used for the willeying process in the woollen industry.

== See also ==
- Grade II* listed buildings in Greater Manchester
- Listed buildings in Saddleworth to 1800
