= Swan Inn, Dobcross =

Listed pub in Greater Manchester, England

Swan Inn
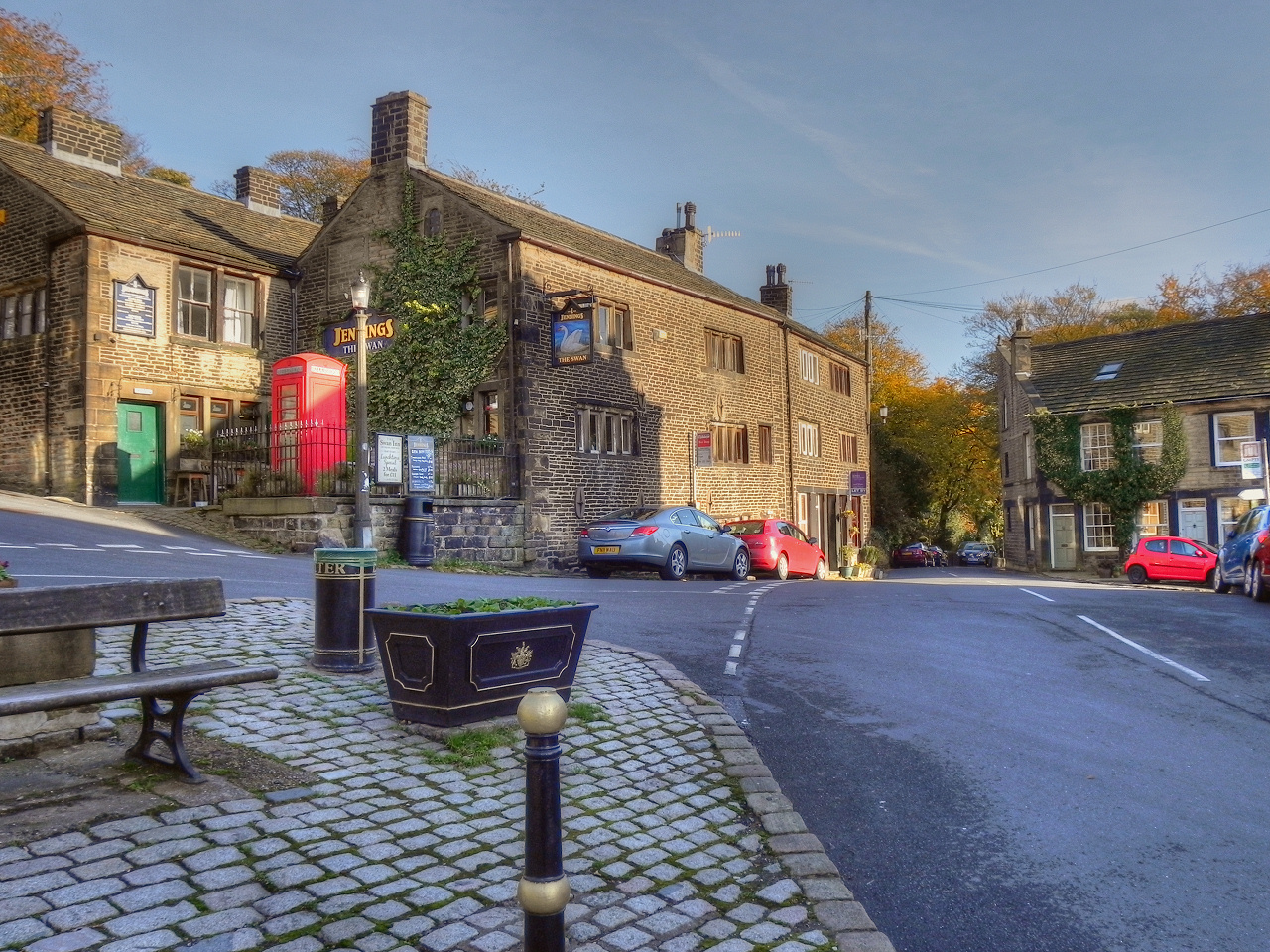
- The pub in 2011

- Location within Greater Manchester
- Former names: King's Head
- Alternative names: Top House

General information
- Type: Public house
- Location: The Square, Dobcross, Greater Manchester, England
- Coordinates: 53.5563°N 2.0129°W
- Year built: 1765; 261 years ago
- Owner: Marston's

Design and construction
- Designations

Listed Building – Grade II
- Official name: The Swan Inn
- Designated: 3 July 1986
- Reference no.: 1356398

Listed Building – Grade II
- Official name: K6 telephone kiosk outside Swan Inn
- Designated: 11 November 1987
- Reference no.: 1253528

The Swan Inn is a Grade II listed public house on The Square in Dobcross, a village in Saddleworth within the Metropolitan Borough of Oldham, Greater Manchester, England. Built in 1765, as indicated by a datestone, the building's upstairs room was used as a magistrates' court in the 18th century. It appears as the King's Head on the 1892 Ordnance Survey map. The pub has been operated by Marston's since at least the 2010s, and it is locally known as the Top House.

== History ==
The inscription "BW SW 1765" on a more recent datestone, referring to Benjamin Wrigley, is taken to mark the building's construction in 1765; at that time it was owned by the Wrigley family, who are locally said to be connected to the line that later founded the chewing gum company. In the 18th century, the upstairs room of the building was used as a magistrates' court. The 1892 Ordnance Survey map marks the building as the King's Head public house, although no name is shown on the 1906 and 1932 editions.

On 3 July 1986, the Swan Inn was designated a Grade II listed building. A K6-type telephone kiosk, designed by Giles Gilbert Scott in 1935, was installed outside the pub and was Grade II listed on 11 November 1987.

Local news coverage from the 2010s records the Swan Inn as being operated by Marston's, with the company appointing tenants and issuing statements about the pub. It is locally referred to as the Top House; the period from which this name dates is uncertain.

== Architecture ==
The building is constructed in dressed stone and has a stone-slate roof laid in graded courses. It follows a double‑depth layout with two bays and two storeys above a basement. The corners are strengthened with dressed stone. Each bay has a four‑part window on every floor, including the basement, and most of the stone dividers in these windows were replaced in the 20th century. There are chimney stacks on the gable ends. One gable contains the main entrance, which has a simple stone surround and a dated stone above it, along with two‑part windows and a small arched opening in the attic.

A second range was added at the back in two stages and extends to the left. This later section also has dressed‑stone corners, 19th‑century door and window openings, and a gable window divided into four parts with a flat stone frame.

== See also ==
- Listed buildings in Saddleworth to 1800
- Listed pubs in Greater Manchester
