= Lydgate, Greater Manchester =

Village in Greater Manchester, England

Coordinates: 53.537°N 2.041°W

Lydgate
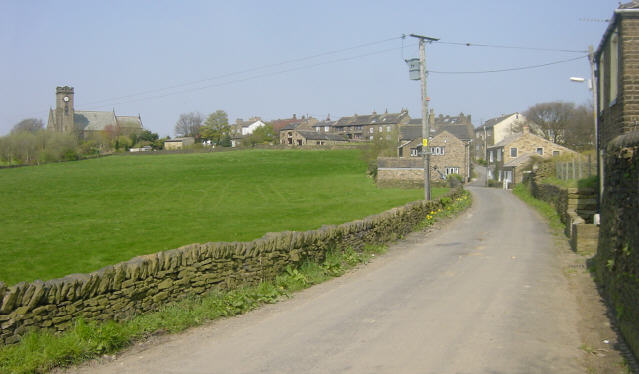
- Lydgate

- Location within Greater Manchester
- OS grid reference: SD972045
- Civil parish: Saddleworth
- Metropolitan borough: Oldham
- Metropolitan county: Greater Manchester
- Region: North West
- Country: England
- Sovereign state: United Kingdom
- Post town: OLDHAM
- Postcode district: OL4
- Dialling code: 01457
- Police: Greater Manchester
- Fire: Greater Manchester
- Ambulance: North West
- UK Parliament: Oldham East and Saddleworth

Lydgate is a village in the civil parish of Saddleworth in the Metropolitan Borough of Oldham, in Greater Manchester, England. The village, which has a church, was part of the Agbrigg Wapentake, part of the historic West Riding of Yorkshire.

There are a number of listed buildings in the village, including the late 17th-century Grotton Hall, the White Hart pub, and St Anne's Church.

== See also ==
- Listed buildings in Saddleworth
