= Dobcross railway station =

Former railway station in England

Dobcross

General information
- Location: Dobcross, Oldham; England
- Coordinates: 53.5531°N 2.0186°W
- Grid reference: SD988062

Other information
- Status: Disused

History
- Original company: London and North Western Railway
- Pre-grouping: London and North Western Railway
- Post-grouping: London, Midland and Scottish Railway

Key dates
- 1 January 1912: Station opened
- 2 May 1955: Station closed
Location

Dobcross railway station served the village of Dobcross between 1912 and 1955.

== History ==
The station was opened on 1 January 1912 as part of the London and North Western Railway route from Oldham to Delph.

The station closed on 2 May 1955, when the Delph Donkey passenger train service from Oldham to Delph via Greenfield was withdrawn.

Preceding station	Disused railways	Following station
Moorgate Halt; Line and station closed	L&NW; Delph Donkey	Measurements Halt; Line and station closed
