= Grotton and Springhead railway station =

Former railway station in England

Grotton and Springhead
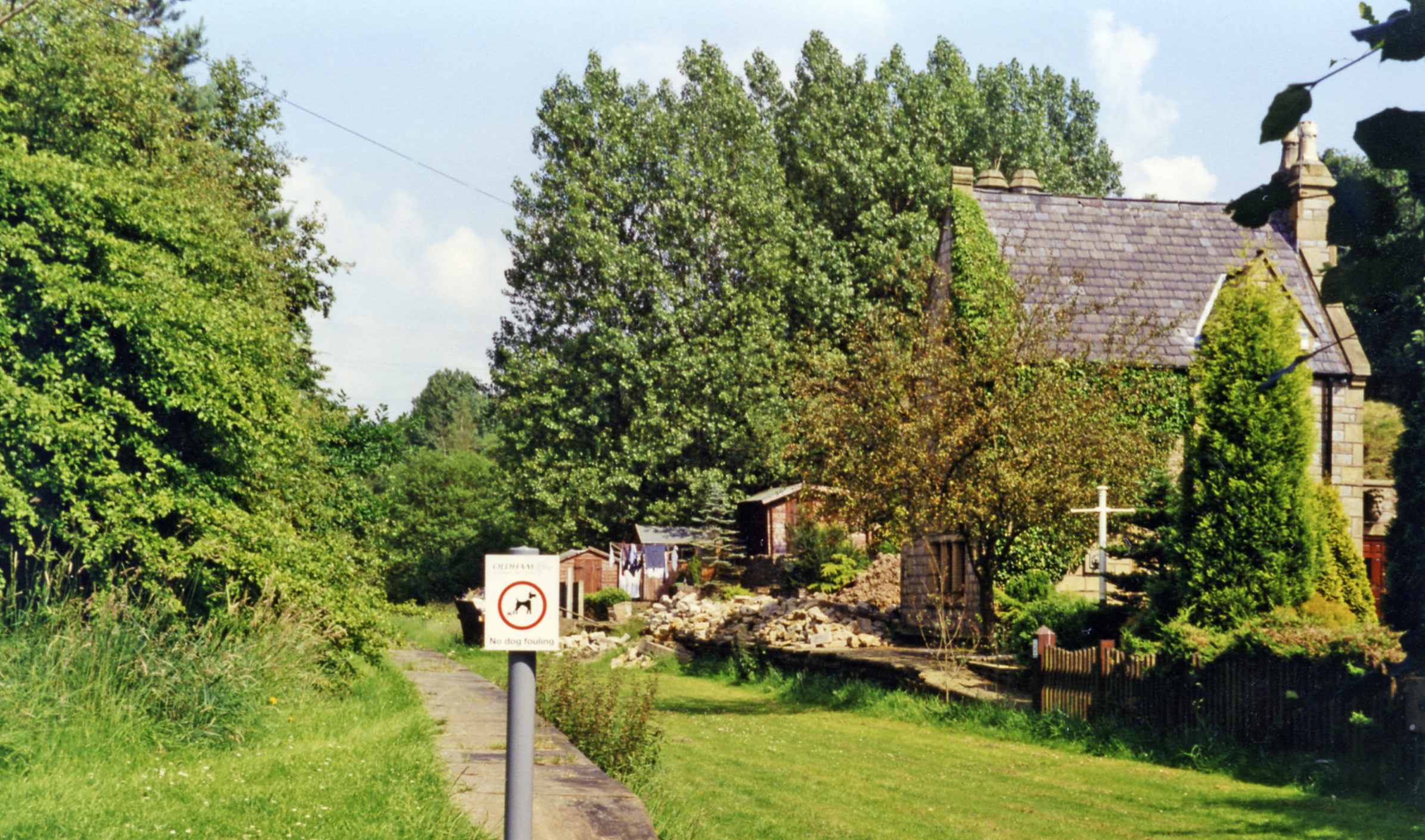
- Remains of the station in 1997

General information
- Location: Grotton, Oldham; England
- Coordinates: 53.5355°N 2.0553°W
- Grid reference: SD964043
- Platforms: 2

Other information
- Status: Disused

History
- Original company: London and North Western Railway
- Pre-grouping: London and North Western Railway
- Post-grouping: London, Midland and Scottish Railway

Key dates
- 5 July 1856: Opened as Grotton
- 1 April 1900: Renamed Grotton and Springhead
- 2 May 1955: Closed
Location

Grotton and Springhead railway station served the villages of Grotton and Springhead from 1856 until 1955.

== History ==
The London and North Western Railway opened a branch from Greenfield to Oldham on 5 July 1856. Grotton was one of two intermediate stations which opened on the same day.

On 1 April 1900, the station was renamed Grotton and Springhead.

The station closed on 2 May 1955, when the Delph Donkey passenger train service to Delph via Greenfield was withdrawn. The line remained in use for goods traffic until 1964. The station building still survives as a private residence.

Preceding station	Disused railways	Following station
Lees; Line and station closed	London and North Western Railway; Delph Donkey	Grasscroft; Line and station closed
