= Lees railway station =

Former railway station in England

Lees

General information
- Location: Oldham; England
- Coordinates: 53.5396°N 2.0693°W
- Platforms: 2

Other information
- Status: Disused

History
- Opened: 5 July 1856
- Closed: 2 May 1955
- Original company: London and North Western Railway
- Pre-grouping: London and North Western Railway
- Post-grouping: London, Midland and Scottish Railway

Key dates
- 2 May 1955: Closed to passengers
- 16 December 1963: Closed to goods traffic
- 13 April 1964: Line closed
Location

Lees railway station opened on 5 July 1856 at Lees, Lancashire, when the London and North Western Railway (L&NWR) opened the branch from Greenfield to Oldham.

The station was located to the south-east of St. John Street, where it crossed the railway. There were two running lines with platforms on the outer sides connected by a footbridge. The main building was to the south of the line and was accessed by a ramp running down from the road over-bridge. To the south east of the station was a goods yard with a goods shed and between the station and the goods shed was a coal depôt. The goods yard was able to accommodate most types of goods including live stock and was equipped with a ten ton crane.

Services Initially services ran to Oldham Mumps (L&NWR) and to Greenfield with some of these continuing to Delph. From 1 July 1862 trains were extended from Oldham Mumps to Oldham Clegg Street, later that year the L&NWR closed its Mumps station replacing it with Oldham Glodwick Road.

By 1866 the station saw fourteen services in each direction (four on Sundays) of which three continued to Delph (none on Sundays). By 1922 the number of services had increased to about thirty-nine each way (there was some variation on Saturdays) of which eighteen continued to Delph (none on Sundays). In 1939 the LMS service was about the same with around thirty-eight services each way, with even more variation on Saturdays, twenty-one of which continued to Delph (except on Sundays).

The station closed to passengers on 2 May 1955, when the Delph Donkey passenger train service to Delph via Greenfield was withdrawn. The station closed to goods traffic on 16 December 1963. The line remained open until 13 April 1964.

Not far from the station, to the north east, was Lees Engine Shed which was open from 1878 to April 1964.

Currently the line is a cyclepath and there is no evidence of the station remaining.

Preceding station	Disused railways	Following station
Oldham Glodwick Road	L&NW; Delph Donkey	Grotton and Springhead
