= Grasscroft railway station =

Former railway station in England

Grasscroft

General information
- Location: Grasscroft, Oldham; England
- Coordinates: 53.5360°N 2.0260°W
- Grid reference: SD983044
- Platforms: 2

Other information
- Status: Disused

History
- Original company: London and North Western Railway
- Pre-grouping: London and North Western Railway
- Post-grouping: London, Midland and Scottish Railway

Key dates
- 1 January 1912: Station opened
- 16 July 1917: Station closed
- 1 January 1919: Station reopened
- 2 May 1955: Station closed
Location

Grasscroft railway station served the village of Grasscroft between 1912 and 1955.

== History ==
The station opened on 1 January 1912, on the London and North Western Railway route from Oldham to Greenfield. It was located not far from the portal of Lydgate Tunnel. It closed temporarily on 16 July 1917, reopening on 1 January 1919.

The station closed permanently on 2 May 1955, when the Delph Donkey passenger train service to Delph via Greenfield was withdrawn.

Preceding station	Disused railways	Following station
Grotton and Springhead; Line and station closed	London and North Western Railway; Delph Donkey	Greenfield; Line closed, station open
