= Oldham Glodwick Road railway station =

Former railway station in England

Oldham Glodwick Road

General information
- Location: Mumps, Oldham; England
- Coordinates: 53.5413°N 2.0973°W
- Grid reference: SD936050
- Platforms: 3

Other information
- Status: Disused

History
- Original company: London and North Western Railway
- Pre-grouping: London and North Western Railway
- Post-grouping: London, Midland and Scottish Railway

Key dates
- 1 November 1862: Station opened
- 2 May 1955: Station closed
Location

Oldham Glodwick Road railway station opened on 1 November 1862 when the London and North Western Railway (L&NWR) revised the termination of the branch to Oldham from its main-line at Greenfield.

== History ==
The branch, which had opened in 1856, originally terminated at Oldham Mumps (L&NWR), on 1 July 1862 the branch was extended to meet the Oldham, Ashton and Guide Bridge Railway (OA&GBR) at Oldham Clegg Street over jointly owned tracks. Oldham Glodwick Road station opened on 1 November 1862 replacing Oldham Mumps (L&NWR) as their final station on the Oldham branch. (Note: Hooper (1991) states the station was initially known as Glodwick Lane.)

== Location ==
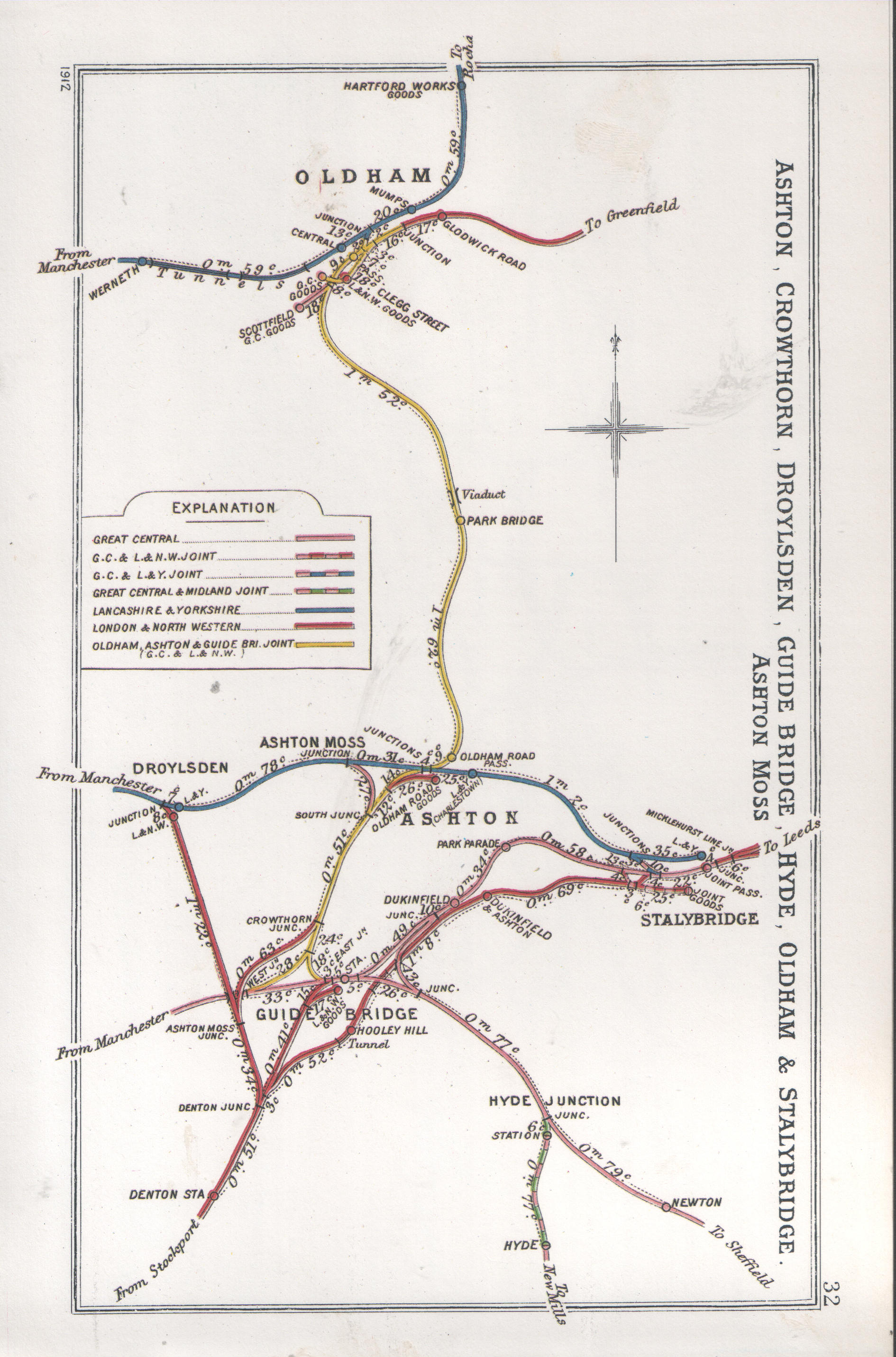
A 1912 Railway Clearing House Junction Diagram showing railways in the vicinity of Oldham Glodwick Road (upper centre)

The station was located where the branch line was crossed by Glodwick Road, to the east of the road bridge the line was in a cutting, which was covered over for some time, it was an open cutting by 1922.

== Description ==
The passenger station had two through platforms on the outsides of the tracks and a bay platform on the south side for terminating (OA&GBR) trains, there was an additional goods bay line to the south of the passenger bay platform. The main platforms were linked by an enclosed footbridge. There was an associated goods station with shed located to the southwest of the passenger station. Between the goods yard and the passenger station they were able to accommodate most types of goods including live stock, the goods yard was equipped with a ten ton crane.

== Services ==
=== L&NWR Oldham branch ===
In 1866 Bradshaw's timetable showed only one entry and time for this station and Oldham Clegg Street, it is assumed that all trains ran to both stations, they were approximately half a mile apart. The 14 trains travelling along the L&NWR Oldham branch to and from Greenfield and Delph probably started at Oldham Clegg Street, on to Glodwick Road and then onwards, on their return they halted at Glodwick Road and then terminated at Clegg Street.

By 1895 this pattern of service had been formalised in the timetable which now showed both Oldham stations, there were 16 services to Greenfield along the Oldham branch most weekdays, with 8 continuing to Delph. In 1922 there were 39 services on the branch with 18 continuing to Delph.

=== Oldham, Ashton and Guide Bridge Railway ===
Early timetables do not show OA&GBR services as starting from Glodwick Road. (Note: Dow (1959) has the Bradshaw 1861 timetable which shows services starting from Clegg Street.) By 1895 Bradshaw shows 24 services on the OA&GBR of which 20 started or finished at Glodwick Road. In 1922 there were 12 services on the OA&GBR of which 10 started or finished at Glodwick Road.

=== London Midland & Scottish Railway ===
By 1939 there had been some consolidation, weekdays had 14 OA&GBR line services with an additional six on Saturdays. The LMS had eleven services to and from Stockport with an additional three on Saturdays which terminated at Glodwick Road. On the branch to Greenfield there were more than 35 services each way on weekdays.

== Closure ==
The passenger station closed on 2 May 1955, when the Delph Donkey passenger train service to Delph via Greenfield was withdrawn.

The Oldham branch from Greenfield remained open for goods traffic until 1964. The goods station and shed closed on 21 August 1967 having been served by lines from the south-west after the Oldham branch closed.

Since closure the cutting, the station was sited in, has been infilled and landscaped.

Preceding station	Disused railways	Following station
Oldham Clegg Street; Line and station closed	London and North Western Railway; Oldham branch Delph Donkey	Lees; Line and station closed
