= Measurements Halt railway station =

Former railway station in England

Measurements Halt

General information
- Location: Delph, Oldham; England
- Coordinates: 53.5575°N 2.0236°W
- Grid reference: SD985067

Other information
- Status: Disused

History
- Original company: London, Midland and Scottish Railway
- Post-grouping: London, Midland and Scottish Railway

Key dates
- 18 July 1932: Station opened
- 2 May 1955: Station closed
Location

Measurements Halt railway station was opened on 18 July 1932 as part of the former London and North Western Railway route from Oldham to Delph. The station closed on 2 May 1955, when the Delph Donkey passenger train service to Delph via Greenfield was withdrawn. It served the Measurements factory and only one train in each direction called at the station per day.

While the line past the station site was opened by the LNWR in 1851, by the time Measurements Halt opened in 1932, the LNWR had already merged with other companies to form the London, Midland and Scottish Railway and that company is credited with opening the station - the only station on the Delph Donkey Line opened after the LNWR became defunct.

Preceding station	Disused railways	Following station
Dobcross; Line and station closed	London, Midland and Scottish Railway; Delph Donkey	Delph; Line and station closed
