= Ashton railway station (disambiguation) =

Ashton railway station was a station in Devon, opened by the Great Western Railway (GWR) in 1882 and closed in 1958

Ashton railway station may also refer to:

- Ashton and Hooley Hill railway station, now known as Guide Bridge railway station, opened by the Sheffield, Ashton-under-Lyne and Manchester Railway in 1841
- Ashton Gate railway station, opened by the GWR in 1906 and closed in 1964, with occasional use until 1974
- Ashton Hall railway station, opened by the London and North Western Railway in 1883 as Mr Starkie's Platform and closed in 1930
- Ashton-in-Makerfield railway station, opened by the Liverpool, St Helens and South Lancashire Railway in 1900 and closed in 1952
- Ashton Moss railway station, opened by the Oldham, Ashton and Guide Bridge Railway (OA&GB) in 1861 and closed in 1862
- Ashton Oldham Road railway station, opened by the OA&GB in 1861 and closed in 1960
- Ashton Park Parade railway station, opened by the Manchester, Sheffield and Lincolnshire Railway in 1845 and closed in 1956
- Ashton-under-Hill railway station, opened by the Midland Railway in 1864 and closed in 1963
- Ashton-under-Lyne railway station, opened by the Lancashire and Yorkshire Railway in 1846 as Ashton Charlestown
- Long Ashton railway station, originally known as Ashton, opened by the Bristol and Exeter Railway in 1841 or 1852 and closed in 1856
