= Park Bridge =

Area of Ashton-under-Lyne, England

Coordinates: 53.518897°N 2.08296°W

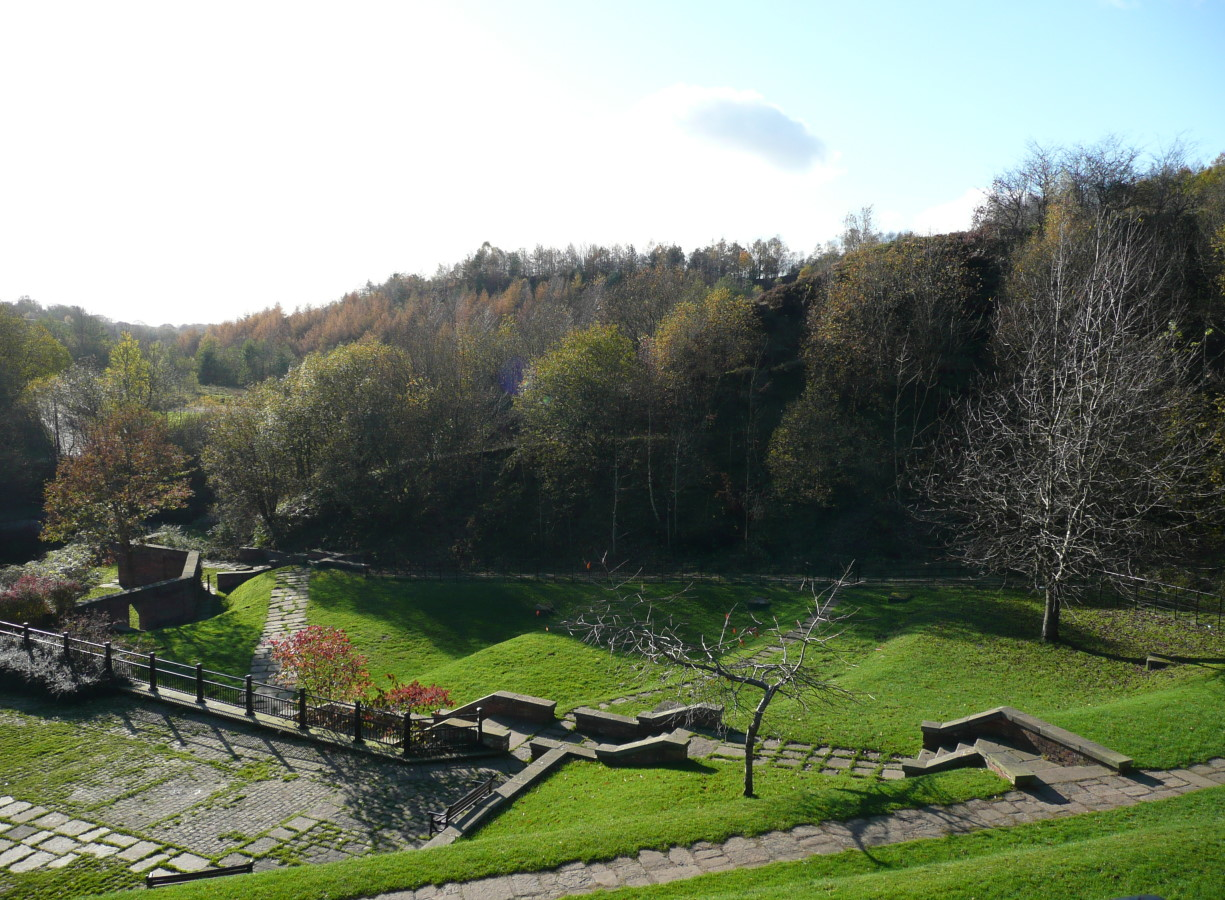
- View of Park Bridge from the ironworks

- Location within Greater Manchester
- OS grid reference: SD9402
- Metropolitan borough: Tameside
- Metropolitan county: Greater Manchester
- Region: North West
- Country: England
- Sovereign state: United Kingdom
- Post town: ASHTON-UNDER-LYNE
- Postcode district: OL
- Dialling code: 0161
- Police: Greater Manchester
- Fire: Greater Manchester
- Ambulance: North West
- UK Parliament: Ashton-under-Lyne

Park Bridge is an area of Ashton-under-Lyne, in the Metropolitan Borough of Tameside, in Greater Manchester, England. It is situated in the Medlock Valley, by Ashton-under-Lyne's border with Oldham. Park Bridge anciently lay within the medieval manor of Ashton; however, there is no record of Park Bridge until the 17th century. The name is probably a reference to the medieval Lyme Park, in the north west of the manor of Ashton. For nearly two hundred years from the 18th to the 20th centuries it was the site of the Park Bridge Ironworks.

== History ==
Samuel Lees junior founded Park Bridge ironworks in 1786 on 14 perches of land rented from the Earl of Stamford. Originally the ironworks produced raw iron; the ironworks was one of the largest in 19th century Tameside, and one of the earliest ironworks in the northwest. Samuel Lees' wife, Hannah Lees (née Buckley), inherited ownership of the ironworks on her husband's death in 1804. Under Hannah Lees, the ironworks was expanded including the construction of a weir and a water power building on the River Medlock. The success of the ironworks precipitated the construction of worker housing in the 1820s. Further worker housing was added in the 1840s and 1850s. The ironworks remained the largest such works in Tameside, including a nearby colliery and associated with the Oldham, Ashton and Guide Bridge Railway. The business was inherited by another four generations of the Lees family, until the closure of the site. The ironworks started to decline at the end of the 19th century with the cessation of coal mining in the Medlock Valley in 1887. Competition from the steel industry over a long period and the closure of the railway in 1959 further dented the profits. The ironworks finally closed in 1963, still under the control of the Lees family.

The abandoned ironworks fell into decay and was demolished or reduced to ruins in the 1970s. Because the buildings were not recorded before their demolition, the site of the ironworks is of interest to archaeologists – particularly the University of Manchester Archaeological Unit – as part of the development of the later iron industry in the north west. In 1975 the Medlock and Tame Valley Conservation Association opened the Park Bridge Museum to encourage interest in the historical significance of Park Bridge.

In 1986, the museum became a visitor centre, and in 1995 was renamed the Park Bridge Heritage Centre. As of 2024 the centre was open by appointment only, rather than having general opening to the public.

The ironworks provided rivets worldwide. The Eiffel Tower and the Titanic both used its rivets in their construction.

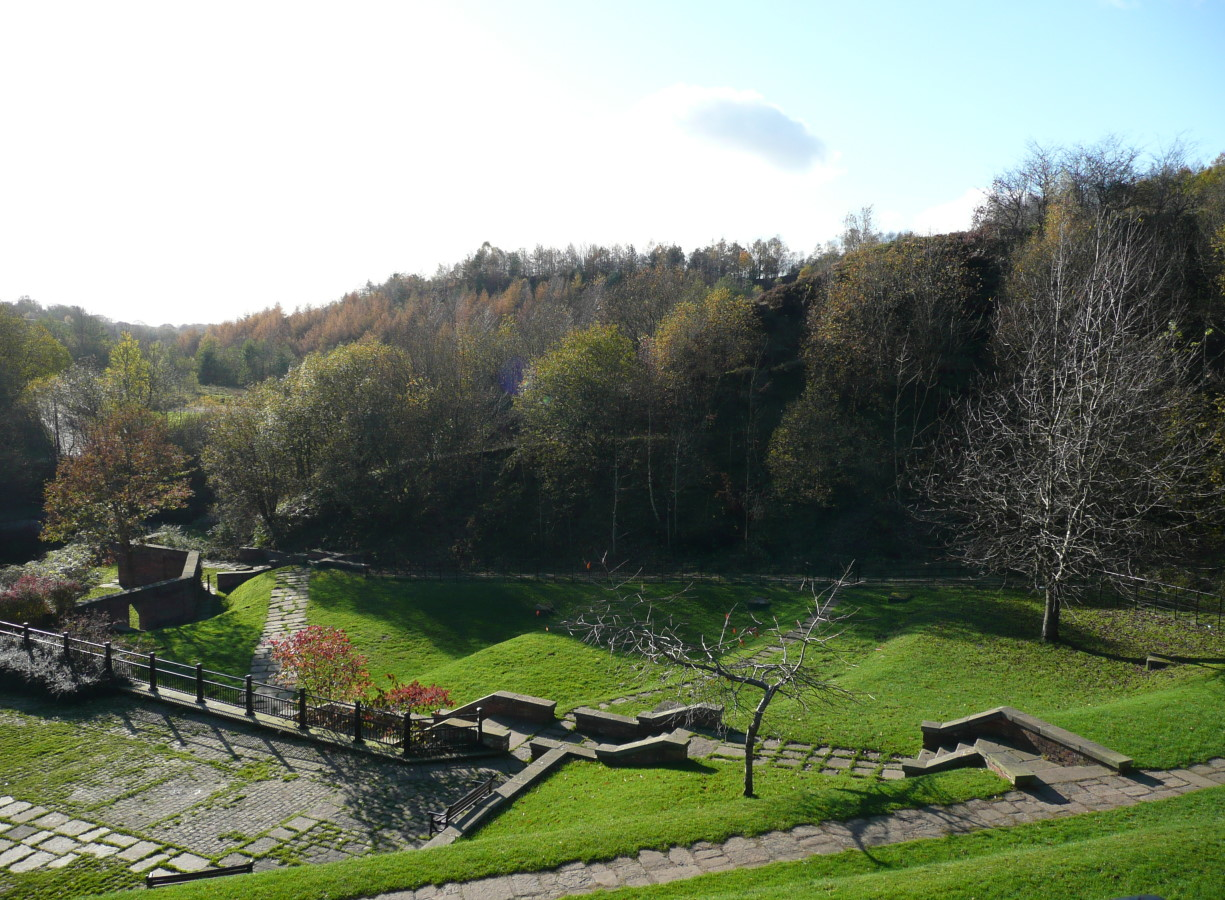

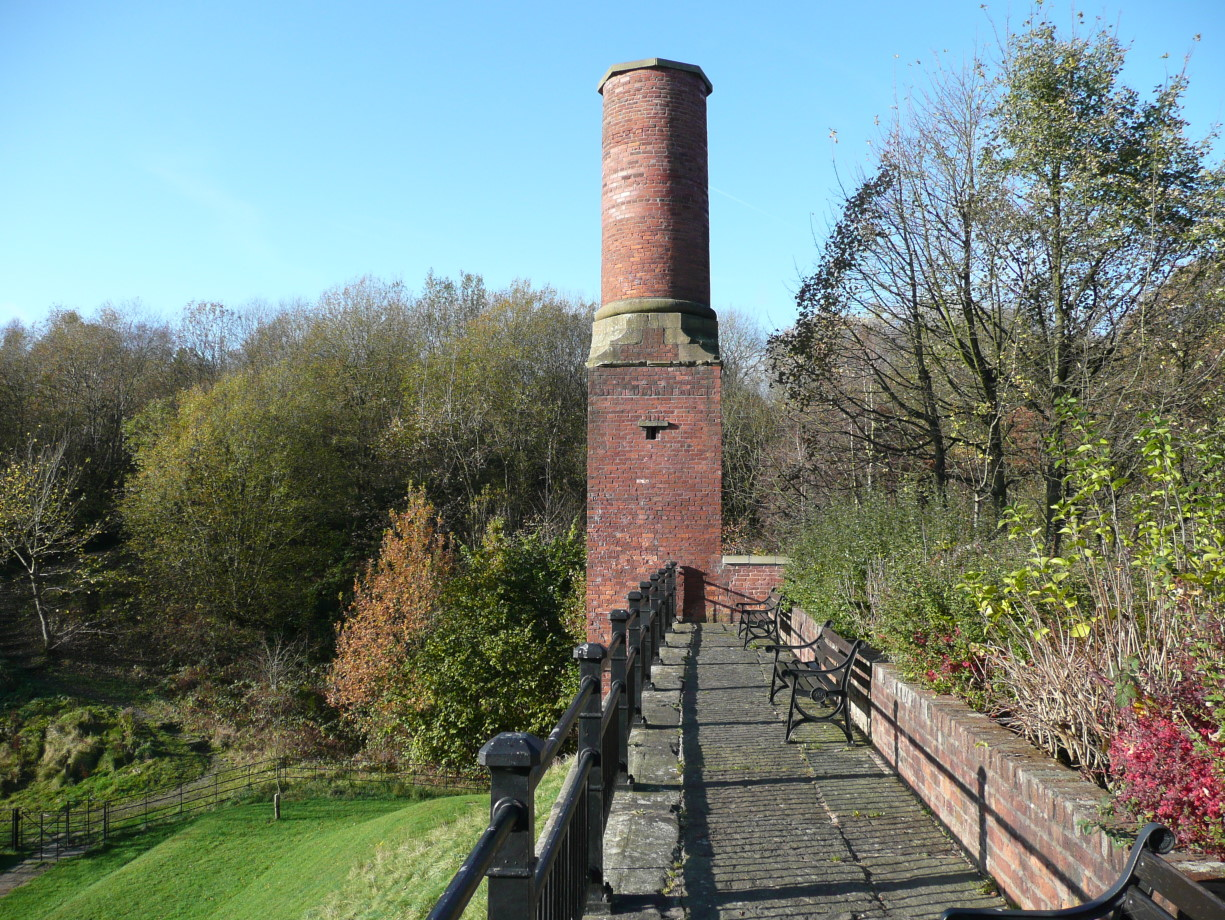

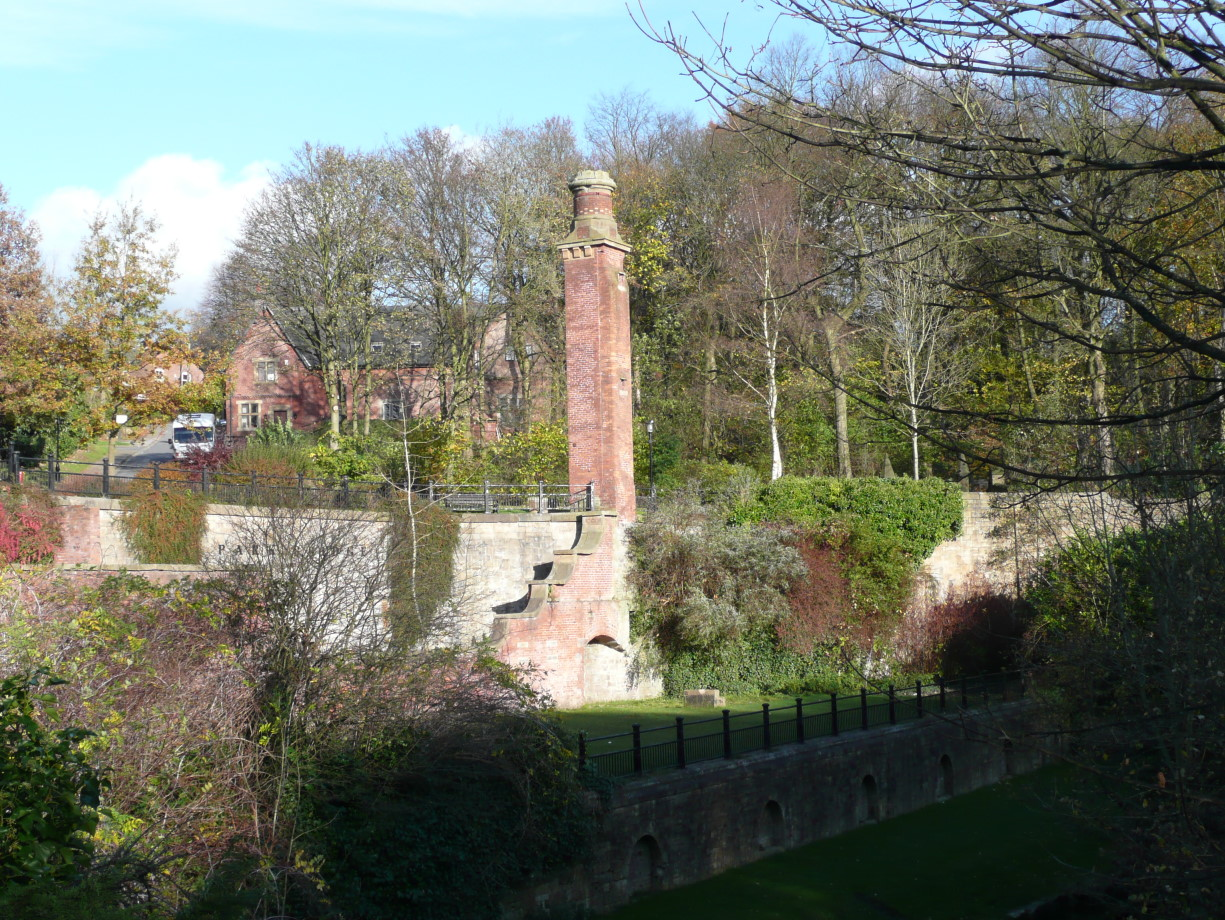

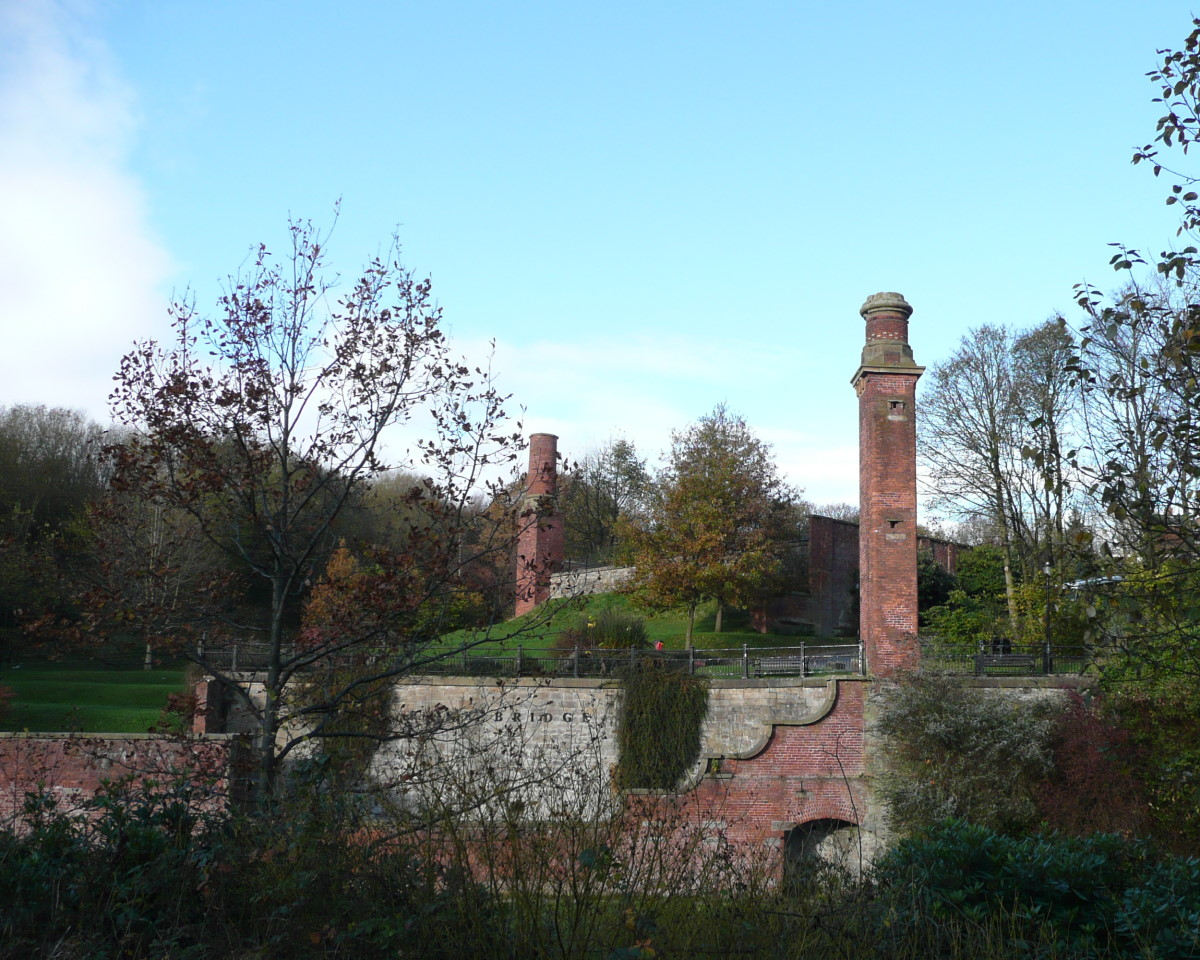

== See also ==
- Park Bridge railway station
