= Moorgate railway station (Greater Manchester) =

Railway station in Manchester, United Kingdom

Moorgate Halt

General information
- Location: Uppermill, Oldham; England
- Coordinates: 53.5469°N 2.0093°W
- Grid reference: SD994055

Other information
- Status: Disused

History
- Original company: London and North Western Railway
- Pre-grouping: London and North Western Railway
- Post-grouping: London, Midland and Scottish Railway

Key dates
- 1 January 1912: Station opened
- 2 May 1955: Station closed
Location

Moorgate Halt railway station was opened on 1 January 1912 on the London and North Western Railway route from Stalybridge to Huddersfield. The station was only ever served by trains from Oldham to Delph via Greenfield. The station closed on 2 May 1955 when this service, known locally as the Delph Donkey, was withdrawn. The location of Moorgate Halt is now marked by a foot crossing over the railway at Uppermill, although no trace of the station remains. Nearby can be seen the foundations of Delph Junction signal box, where trains used to receive the token giving them authorisation to enter the single line section to Delph.

The Transpennine Route Upgrade project has called for the foot crossing to be closed and the footpath diverted. In July 2025 campaigners formed a group, Friends of Moorgate Halt, to call for a bridge to be provided in place of the level crossing, claiming that the proposed alternative route is longer, hazardous and difficult to negotiate.

Preceding station	Historical railways	Following station
Greenfield; Line and station open	London and North Western Railway; Delph Donkey	Dobcross; Line and station closed
Greenfield; Line and station open	London and North Western Railway; Huddersfield Line	Saddleworth; Line open, station closed
