= Oldham Mumps railway station (London and North Western Railway) =

Former railway station in England

Oldham Mumps

General information
- Location: Mumps, Oldham; England
- Coordinates: 53.5406°N 2.1004°W
- Grid reference: approx. SD9304

Other information
- Status: Disused

History
- Original company: London and North Western Railway

Key dates
- 5 July 1856: Station opened
- 1 November 1862: Station closed
Location

Oldham Mumps (L&NWR) railway station opened on 5 July 1856 as the terminus of the Oldham branch from Greenfield, the station served the Mumps area of Oldham. The station was probably only known as Oldham during its brief period of existence, the suffixes Mumps and L&NWR may have been added later to provide clarity between the various stations in Oldham. Hooper (1991) states the station was a temporary affair called Victoria. Several sources claim the station was only ever to be temporary.

The station location is not precisely known, it has been described as being: (Note: The station is not shown on the national Library of Scotlands online copy of the Ordnance Survey six-inch map surveyed in 1844—1845 despite the line being shewn (they both opened on the same day), the map has been updated to show Ashton-under-Lyne data up to 1863 and indeed it shows Oldham Clegg Street and the line running from there to the Oldham branch that was opened on 1 July 1861, but Oldham Glodwick Road is not shown and that opened on 1 November 1862. The station must be situated between the convergence of the two companies lines and Albion Corn Mill.)

- "...by a Junction with the Mumps Extension of the Lancashire and Yorkshire Railway at or near Mumps Mill." (Italics and capitalisation in original).
- "...presumably adjacent to the LYR station."
- "...with the Oldham Branch of the London and North Western Railway, at or near their Oldham station, at a place called Mumps,..."
- "...their existing terminus at Oldham Mumps..."
- "...this branch terminated at a station adjacent to the L&Y at Oldham Mumps."
- "...adjacent to the L&Y's Mumps station."

Hooper (1991) states that "there was a junction with the L&Y and a one road engine shed was erected for the engine that would work the branch, with a turntable completing the facilities".

The station became a through station on 1 July 1862 when it was connected to the Oldham, Ashton and Guide Bridge Railway at Oldham Clegg Street over jointly owned tracks.

The station closed on 1 November 1862, when it was replaced by Oldham Glodwick Road.

Preceding station	Disused railways	Following station
Terminus (to 30 June 1862)	London and North Western Railway; Oldham branch	Lees; Line and station closed
Oldham Clegg Street (from 1 July 1862); Line and station closed	London and North Western Railway; Oldham branch	Lees; Line and station closed
