= Saddleworth railway station =

Former railway station in England

Saddleworth

General information
- Location: Dobcross, Oldham; England
- Coordinates: 53.5544°N 2.0073°W
- Grid reference: SD996064
- Platforms: 2

Other information
- Status: Disused

History
- Original company: London and North Western Railway
- Pre-grouping: London and North Western Railway
- Post-grouping: London, Midland and Scottish Railway

Key dates
- 1 August 1849: Station opened
- 7 October 1968: Station closed
Location

Saddleworth railway station, on the Huddersfield Line in Dobcross to the north of Uppermill, opened in August 1849 and closed to passengers in October 1968 as a consequence of a report by Richard Beeching on the restructuring of railway networks. The former station building can still be seen, having been sold after closure and converted into a private residence. It was the home of television director Ken Stephinson between 1978 and 2012.

== History ==
Saddleworth railway station opened on 1 August 1849. It was one of several railway stations within the parish of Saddleworth, and Joseph Bradbury recounts in his nineteenth-century work Saddleworth Sketches the confusion this caused to those who were unaware that the station, despite its name, did not serve the whole of Saddleworth. In his account, passengers would book journeys to Saddleworth station, and realise on arrival that they were several miles from their anticipated destination. Likewise, goods would be sent mistakenly to Saddleworth station, when this was in fact inconvenient for many recipients. Bradbury concluded that, despite the clarity a name change would provide, "it may fairly be doubted if anything short of Her Majesty's warrant could change it from Saddleworth to Brownhill station".

The station closed on 7 October 1968 (the last trains had called on 5 October 1968), following Richard Beeching's 1963 report on the restructuring of railway networks. The report had recommended that all branch stations on the Huddersfield Line should be closed, but after negotiations, the stations at Mossley, Greenfield, and Marsden remained open. Diggle railway station, also on the Huddersfield Line, closed on the same day as Saddleworth station.

After closure, the station buildings were converted to a private residence; the waiting room and ticket office became the living room, and the goods yard became a garden. In 1978, television director Ken Stephinson moved into the property with his wife Marjorie and remained there until his death in 2012. A conservatory was added during their period of residence, and the adjacent stationmaster's cottage was converted into a one-bedroom flat.

| Preceding station | Historical railways | Following station |
|---|---|---|
| Moorgate; Line open, station closed | London and North Western Railway; Huddersfield Line | Diggle; Line open, station closed |

== Bibliography ==
- An Illustrated History of Oldham's Railways by John Hooper (ISBN 1-871608-19-8)
