= Ashton Moss railway station =

Disused railway station in England

Ashton Moss

General information
- Location: Ashton-under-Lyne, Tameside; England
- Coordinates: 53.48439°N 2.11367°W
- Grid reference: SJ 925 986

Other information
- Status: Disused

History
- Opened: 26 August 1861
- Closed: 1 June 1862
- Original company: Oldham, Ashton and Guide Bridge Junction Railway (OA&GB)
- Pre-grouping: OA&GB
- Post-grouping: OA&GB
Location

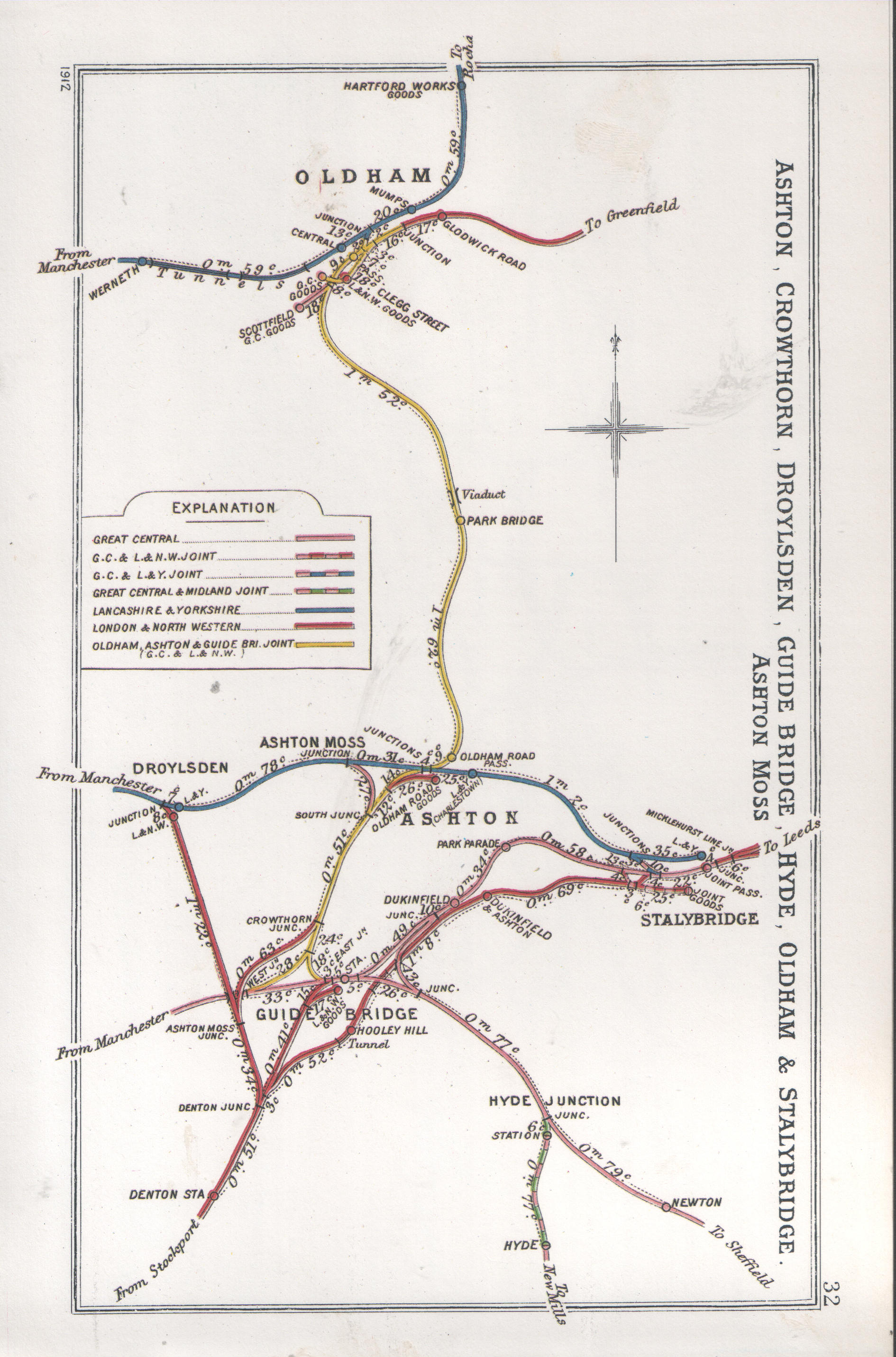
1912 map of railway lines in the area. Ashton Moss would have been located just below south junction.

Ashton Moss railway station was a short lived station on the Oldham, Ashton and Guide Bridge Railway (OA&GB) that served the town of Ashton-under-Lyne.

== History ==
The station opened on 26 August 1861 when the Oldham, Ashton and Guide Bridge Railway (Note: The Oldham, Ashton-under-Lyne and Guide Bridge Junction Railway was the full name of the railway as defined in its enabling Act, it was often shortened by the omission of -under-Lyne and Junction.) opened its line from Guide Bridge to Oldham Clegg Street. The station was located on Moss Lane, at the west end of the town. It had two services in each direction, one early morning, the other late evening. Only the early morning services were provided on Sundays. The station closed on 1 June 1862.

Whilst most of the former OA&GB line is closed the line through the station site is still in use for freight and occasional diversions from Denton, onto the former OA&GB line through where Ashton Moss had been then taking the south to west curve onto the former GCR line towards Manchester.

On 14 April 2014, Ashton Moss North Junction signal box was closed for the last time.

Preceding station	Disused railways	Following station
Guide Bridge	Oldham, Ashton and Guide Bridge Railway; Leased jointly by L&NW & GC	Oldham Road

== Metrolink ==
The name Ashton Moss is now used by a tram stop in a different location on the East Manchester Line of the Manchester Metrolink to Ashton-under-Lyne. Ashton Moss tram stop opened in 2013.
