= Oldham Road railway station (Ashton-under-Lyne) =

Disused railway station in England

Oldham Road

General information
- Location: Ashton-under-Lyne, Tameside; England
- Coordinates: 53.4922°N 2.0991°W
- Grid reference: SJ 935 995
- Platforms: 2

Other information
- Status: Disused

History
- Original company: Oldham, Ashton and Guide Bridge Junction Railway (OA&GB)
- Pre-grouping: OA&GB
- Post-grouping: OA&GB

Key dates
- 26 August 1861: Opened for passengers
- 1 February 1863: Opened for freight
- 4 May 1959: Closed to passengers
- 20 June 1966: Closed to freight
Location

Oldham Road railway station was two stations, one passenger and one goods, located either side of the L&YR main line and either side of Oldham Road, that served the town of Ashton-under-Lyne.

== Passenger station ==
The station opened on 26 August 1861 when the Oldham, Ashton-under-Lyne and Guide Bridge Junction Railway (OA&GB) opened its line from Guide Bridge to Oldham Clegg Street. (Note: The Oldham, Ashton-under-Lyne and Guide Bridge Junction Railway was the full name of the railway as defined in its enabling Act, it was often shortened by the omission of -under-Lyne and Junction.)

=== Location and description ===
The station was located shortly after a branch to the north off the main Lancashire and Yorkshire Railway (L&YR) that the OA&GB had to cross. It was in a cutting on the east side of Oldham Road, which crossed the railway on an overbridge, there were two platforms connected by a footbridge, with single storey station buildings containing a booking office, ladies room, general waiting room, station master's office and a porters' room on the northern, up side, platform. The station was accessed by a ramp down from the junction of Oldham Road and Boodle Street to the southern platform. Two sidings were located to the south of the running line in 1895. (Note: Down trains usually headed away from the major conurbation, usually London, some railway companies ran 'up' to their headquarters location, in this case 'up' trains were going to Oldham Clegg Street and 'down' trains to Manchester London Road.)

The footbridge was still extant in 1910 but was declared unsafe in 1914 and the access arrangements changed, the ramp down to the southern platform was lengthened and an additional set of steps was provided half way along the platform going to Boodle Street, a small booking office was located on the platform at this time. A set of steps led down from Oldham Road onto the northern platform. The goods sidings had expanded considerably on both sides of the running lines and a signal box was sighted off the end of the southern platform. Station hand-books indicate that the passenger station only dealt with passengers and parcels, the sidings use is unknown.

=== Services ===
In 1861 the station was served by eleven down trains and eight up on weekdays, with five services each way on Sundays. By 1895 the station had twenty three OA&GB services each way with an extra one on Saturdays. there were eleven services each way on Sundays. In addition there were eight or nine LNWR services to and from Stockport, most of these going to or from Rochdale, one of the services having a through carriages to London Euston.

=== Closure ===
The passenger station closed on 4 May 1959 following the withdrawal of passenger services on the line.

== Goods station ==
Whilst the passenger station belonged to the OA&GB its associated goods yard, belonged to the LNWR, one of the two railways operating the OA&GB via a leasing arrangement. It was located west of Oldham Road and to the south of L&YR main line with its own connection to the main OA&GB line. The OA&GB opened to freight traffic on 1 February 1863.

The goods yard was able to accommodate most types of goods including live stock, it had a brick built two-storey warehouse, with two tracks running through it, that opened in 1878. The yard was equipped with a ten-ton crane.

Goods services were withdrawn on 20 June 1966.

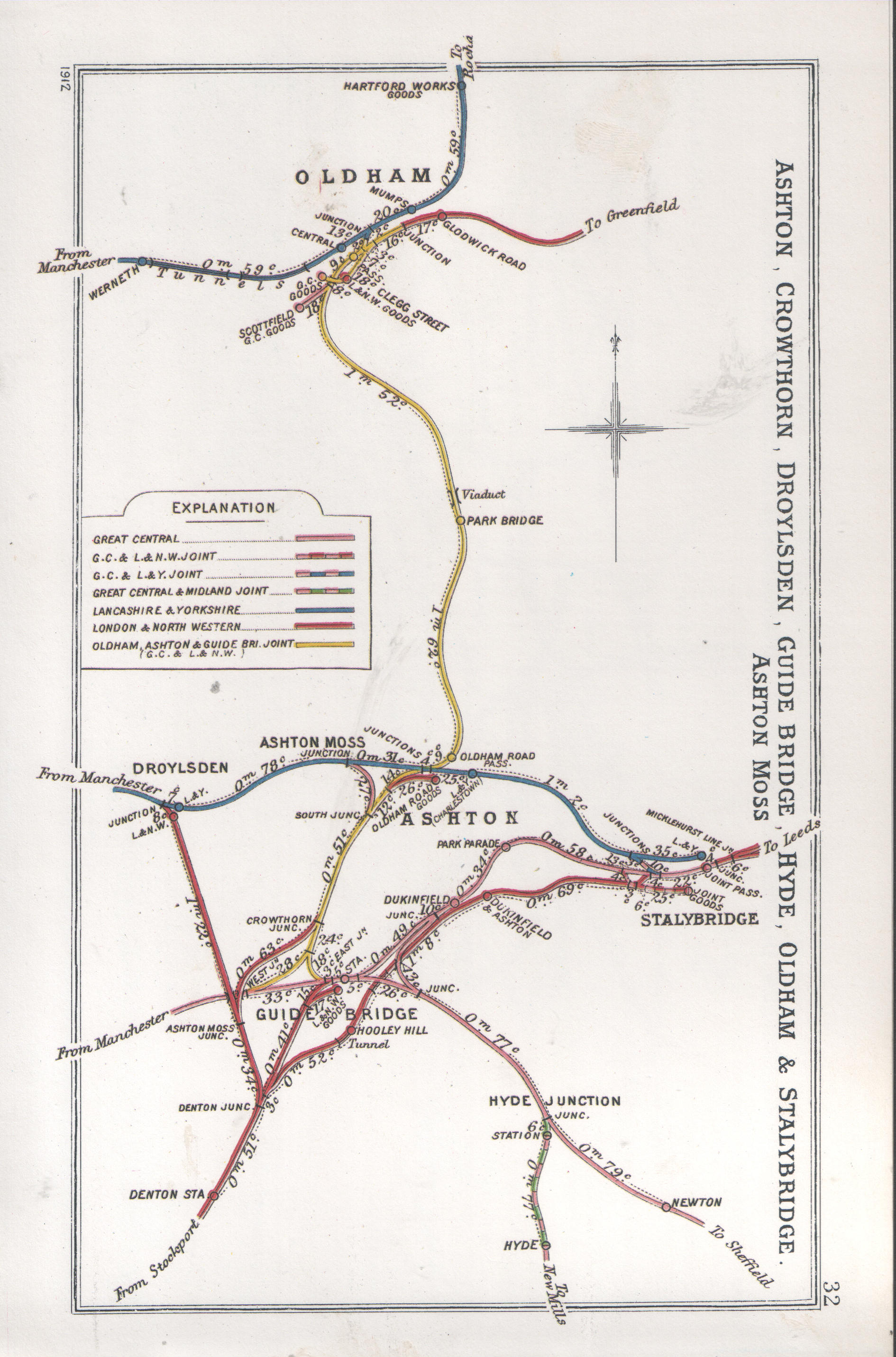
1912 map of railway lines in the area

Preceding station	Disused railways	Following station
Ashton Moss	Oldham, Ashton and Guide Bridge Railway Leased jointly by L&NW & GC	Park Bridge
