= Park Bridge railway station =

Former railway station in Greater Manchester, England

Park Bridge

General information
- Location: Tameside, Greater Manchester; England
- Coordinates: 53.5166°N 2.0929°W
- Grid reference: SD 939 022

Other information
- Status: Disused

History
- Original company: Oldham, Ashton and Guide Bridge Junction Railway (OA&GB)
- Pre-grouping: OA&GB
- Post-grouping: OA&GB

Key dates
- 26 August 1861: Station opened
- by 1925: Goods yard closed
- 4 May 1959: Station closed to passengers
Location

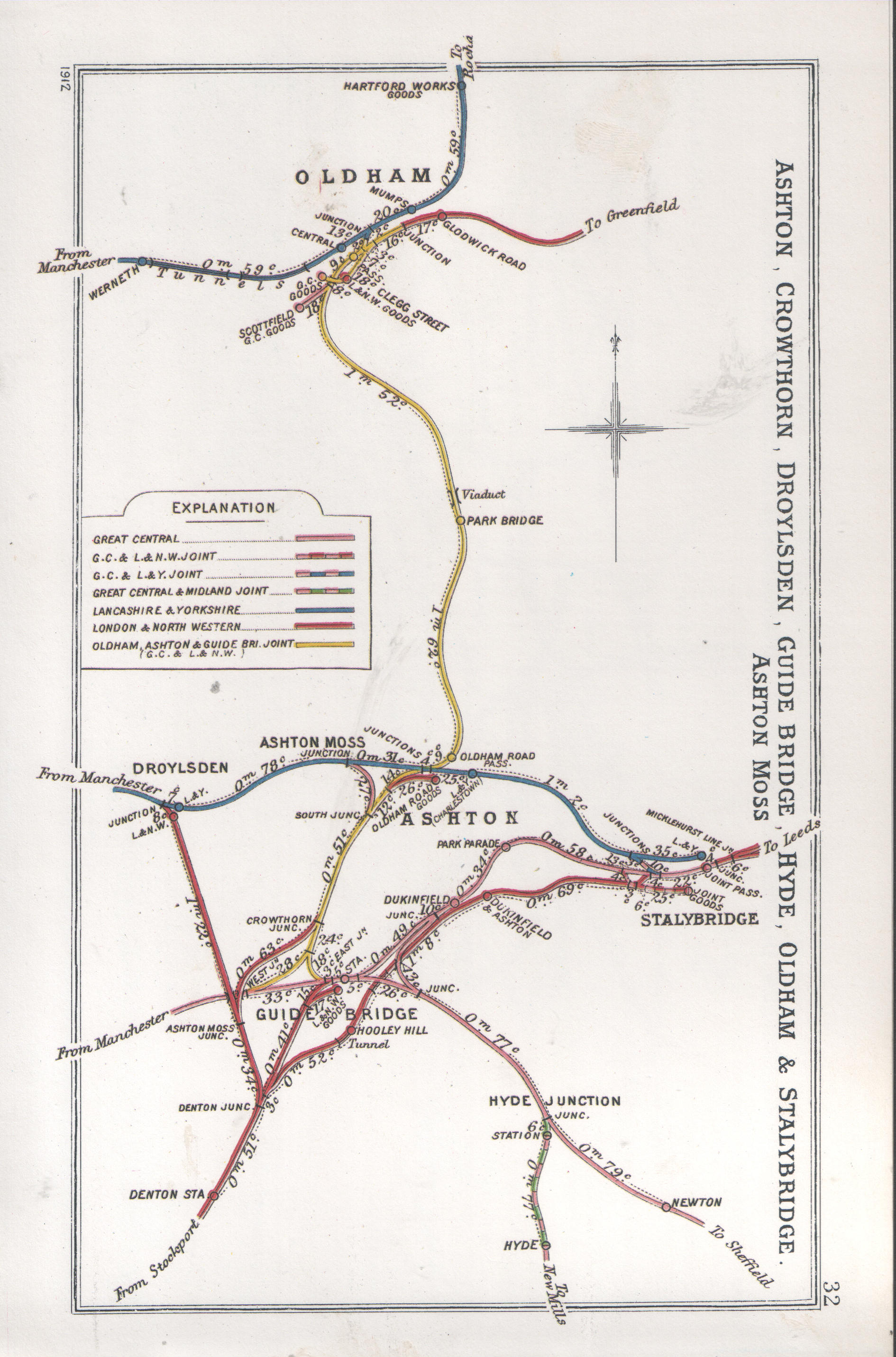
1912 map of railway lines in the area

Park Bridge railway station was a stop on the Oldham, Ashton-under-Lyne and Guide Bridge Junction Railway (OA&GB) that served the village of Park Bridge in Tameside, Greater Manchester, England. It was located in the Medlock Valley near Ashton-under-Lyne's border with Oldham. It was sometimes known as Parkbridge; one photograph of the station shows the station name board with the name as one word and immediately adjacent the signal box with it shown as two.

== History ==
The station opened on 26 August 1861, when the line opened. (Note: The Oldham, Ashton-under-Lyne and Guide Bridge Junction Railway was the full name of the railway as defined in its enabling Act; it was often shortened by the omission of -under-Lyne and Junction.)

The station was located on an embankment leading up to the south side of the viaduct over the River Medlock. The main station building was on the eastern, 'down' side of the running lines leading on to the shorter of two platforms. (Note: Down trains usually headed away from the major conurbation, usually London; some railway companies ran 'up' to their headquarters location, in this case 'up' trains were going to Oldham Clegg Street and 'down' trains to Manchester London Road.) There was an access road and ramp from the Park Bridge Iron Works access road.

A waiting shelter was provided on the other, longer 'up' platform, which appeared to be constructed from baulks of timber, perhaps reused sleepers. Access to this platform was via steps up the embankment from a footpath that ran along the bottom of the embankment.

There were several goods sidings to the east of the station, with no facilities other than a weighing machine. A branch led from the sidings into the Iron Works.

In 1861, the station was served by eight down trains and six up on weekdays, with five services each way on Sundays. By 1895, the station had twenty three OA&GB services each way with an extra one on Saturdays; there were eleven services each way on Sundays. In addition, there were three LNWR services to Stockport Edgeley, but none in the other direction.

Goods services at the station stopped sometime between 1912 and 1925, with only private siding traffic being handled afterwards. The private siding closed in February 1964.

The passenger station closed on 4 May 1959, following the withdrawal of passenger services on the line.

Park Bridge viaduct was 200 yards (180 m) long and 96.5 feet (29.4 m) high, with nine arches of 50 feet (15 m); it was reconstructed in 1960, as the line continued to handle heavy parcels traffic until 1967. The viaduct was demolished in February and March 1971.

After the line's closure, Granada Television's Inheritance series filmed a staged crash of 1850 on the embankment.

Preceding station	Disused railways	Following station
Oldham Road, Ashton	Oldham, Ashton and Guide Bridge Railway Leased jointly by L&NW & GC	Oldham Clegg Street
