= Ken Stephinson =

Ken Stephinson was an English television director and producer. He began working for Tyne-Tees Television in 1958, and later worked at BBC Manchester. While working for the BBC, he produced the first series of Great Railway Journeys, which included the first occasion of Michael Palin presenting a travel programme. He died from cancer in November 2012, at the age of 79.

== Career ==
Stephinson's passion for film began when he started a job as a cinema projectionist after completing his National Service in the Royal Air Force. In 1958, he began working in the film-handling department of the recently established Tyne-Tees Television. He then trained as an editor, and moved to being a director towards the end of the 1960s.

Working with Syd Waddell, Stephinson pioneered the use of background music in news broadcasts. The first time they did this was for a piece on the Durham Miners' Gala. Part of the broadcast combined footage of Prime Minister Harold Wilson enjoying a miners' band, with a backing track of "Dancing in the Street" by Martha and the Vandellas. This incident almost resulted in them losing their jobs, as a result of complaints from the Labour Party and the Independent Broadcasting Authority. Support from colleagues led to Tyne-Tees Television giving them permission to use music in this way in the future, as long as they avoided "serious news subjects". His last job for Tyne-Tees Television was a documentary shot in and around Sunderland on the day that Sunderland AFC won the 1973 FA Cup Final, entitled "Meanwhile, Back in Sunderland".

After a stint at "Nationwide" for the BBC covering the North of England, He later was assigned to the BBC studios in Manchester. He became the head of light entertainment at BBC Manchester, overseeing the production of programmes such as It's a Knockout. While working at BBC Manchester, Stephinson also produced the first series of Great Railway Journeys. He persuaded Michael Palin to present one episode, after hearing him confess on radio that he had an "obsession" with railways. This was the first of many travel programmes that Palin presented. Stephinson also developed a friendship with Russell Harty, which developed after Stephinson began producing Harty's chat show.

After leaving the BBC, Stephinson established an independent production company, which produced several programmes, including episodes of Songs of Praise

== Personal life ==
Stephinson was born in Sunderland, later moving to Manchester while working for the BBC. In 1978, he settled in Saddleworth, occupying the former Saddleworth railway station building. He was married twice, the second time to Marjorie Lofthouse, a fellow broadcaster, who he first met while attending a local drama club. He had two children from his first marriage, Jacqui and Joanne, and two grandsons Samedi and Alphin at the point of his death from lymphoma cancer in November 2012, aged 79.
