= Oldham, Ashton and Guide Bridge Railway =

UK railway company

Oldham, Ashton-under-Lyne and Guide Bridge Junction Railway
- Oldham, Ashton and Guide Bridge Railway

Overview
- Locale: Lancashire
- Dates of operation: 1861–1968
- Successor: British Railways

Technical
- Track gauge: 4 ft 8 1/2 in (1,435 mm) standard gauge
- Electrification: 1,500 V DC Overhead line (Southern section only)
- Length: 6 miles 20 chains (10.1 km)

The Oldham, Ashton and Guide Bridge Junction Railway (OA&GB) was a British railway company, which opened in 1861, connecting Oldham, Ashton and Guide Bridge. The company survived until it was nationalised in 1948.

== Early days ==
In 1847 the Manchester, Sheffield and Lincolnshire Railway (MS&LR) had submitted a scheme to Parliament to build a line from Guide Bridge to Oldham. The bill was rejected in favour of a scheme, presented in the same parliamentary session, for a small network of lines called the Oldham Alliance Railway, a joint venture between the Manchester and Leeds Railway (M&LR) and two companies who had line proposals that had not yet been sanctioned. Its act stated that once half the required capital had been raised by the new companies they would be amalgamated with the M&LR, the required funds were not found and the venture was abandoned in 1850. (Note: The other companies were Oldham District Railways and the Oldham, Manchester, Liverpool and Birkenhead Junction Railway. The scheme would have seen lines built from Oldham to Ashton-under-Lyne, Ashton-under-Lyne to Guide Bridge, Oldham to Rochdale, Oldham to Miles Platting, Oldham to Prestwich and Prestwich to Royton.) (Note: Oldham Alliance Railway.: An Act for making certain Lines of Railway in the County of Lancaster, to be called "The Oldham Alliance Railway.")

In 1856, a deputation, including the Mayors of Oldham (John Platt) and Ashton-under-Lyne (Nathaniel Buckley), approached the MS&LR to support a line from Guide Bridge which would connect to the Lancashire and Yorkshire Railway (L&YR) and the London and North Western Railway (LNWR) at Oldham.

Oldham, Ashton, and Guide Bridge Junction Railway Act 1857
- Act of Parliament
- Parliament of the United Kingdom
- Long title: An Act for the Construction of Railways to supply direct Communication between Oldham, Ashton-under-Lyne, and Guide Bridge, and for the Accommodation of the Neighbourhood.
- Citation: 20 & 21 Vict. c. cxxxvii

Dates
- Royal assent: 10 August 1857

Text of statute as originally enacted

Initially, the MS&LR had hoped that the other railways would support the scheme but they showed little interest, and the MS&LR board members had to put up the remaining finance privately. (Note: The General Manager of the MS&LR had induced Sir Morton Peto, a former director and railway building contractor, to put up the unsubscribed balance on the understanding that his firm would be awarded the contract at market prices, the board objected to this and to void the agreement found the balance themselves.) Once incorporated as the Oldham, Ashton-under-Lyne and Guide Bridge Junction Railway by the Oldham, Ashton, and Guide Bridge Junction Railway Act 1857 (20 & 21 Vict. c. cxxxvii), the L&YR took an interest, but the MS&LR, wishing the line to be a three way venture, prevailed upon the LNWR to join in. Not wishing to be associated with the LNWR the L&YR withdrew and when it opened the line was operated jointly by the LNWR and MS&LR. (Note: Quick (2022) notes that Ashton and Ashton-under-Lyne are used indiscriminately for the names of the stations, it would appear to be so for the name of the railway as well, its full name as enacted was Oldham, Ashton-under-Lyne and Guide Bridge Junction Railway but often the -under-Lyne and the Junction elements were ignored.)

== Construction ==
The line was laid out by John George Blackburne who also supervised the construction, he later became the lines engineer. Over 800 men were employed in constructing the line which was let in two contracts, James Taylor of Dukinfield built the northern section from Ashton to Oldham and Mr Knight the southern section. The section between Guide Bridge and the L&YR near Ashton was completed in March 1860. Wet weather had hampered further work, for which a long cutting and an embankment, plus the 12-arch Park Bridge Viaduct was needed. By 1 June 1861 the line had been completed apart from the viaduct, the final stretch into Oldham station, Oldham station itself and the connection to the LNWR, it was reported that the railway would soon be open.

== Opening, early management and services ==
Oldham, Ashton and Guide Bridge Junction Railway Leasing Act 1862
- Act of Parliament
- Parliament of the United Kingdom
- Long title: An Act for vesting the Oldham, Ashton-under-Lyne, and Guide Bridge Junction Railway in the Manchester, Sheffield, and Lincolnshire, and the London and North-western Railway Companies and; for other Purposes.
- Citation: 25 & 26 Vict. c. xcviii

Dates
- Royal assent: 30 June 1862

Text of statute as originally enacted

The Oldham, Ashton and Guide Bridge Junction Railway Company organised the building of the railway from incorporation in 1857, saw the lines completion in 1861 and the start of services, albeit using stock provided by the MS&LR. The company's majority shareholders were the MS&LR and the LNWR and the Oldham, Ashton and Guide Bridge Junction Railway Leasing Act 1862 (25 & 26 Vict. c. xcviii), was passed enabled the vesting of the railway in its two major shareholders; the OA&GB thereby became a joint line from 30 June 1862. Each company appointed three out of the nine directors with the other three being local supporters including Platt and Buckley as chairman and deputy chairman respectively.

The line opened on 26 August 1861, with a celebration of the opening taking place on Wednesday 31 August 1861 when a special train carrying 200 guests ran from London Road through Guide Bridge to Clegg Street, Oldham.

In September 1861 the OA&GB operated around twelve round trips between Oldham Clegg Street and Manchester London Road, most went via Guide Bridge where they would be required to reverse direction about half the services didn't call at Park Bridge and Ashton Moss only had two services in each direction. The engines and carriages were provided by the MS&LR.

Goods traffic began operating on the line from 1 February 1863. According to Fraser (1963) there was no urgency to start up goods traffic as the MS&LR owned the Ashton Canal which connected the same towns with Manchester, in effect the OA&GB was competing with one of its owners.

Until 1872 the MS&LR operated the trains, the LNWR took over some services in 1869-1870 and after 1873 coaches were supplied jointly.

After the LNWR link opened to Stockport in 1876 services ran between Stockport, Ashton Oldham Rd, Oldham Clegg Street and Rochdale, there were through carriages to London Euston.

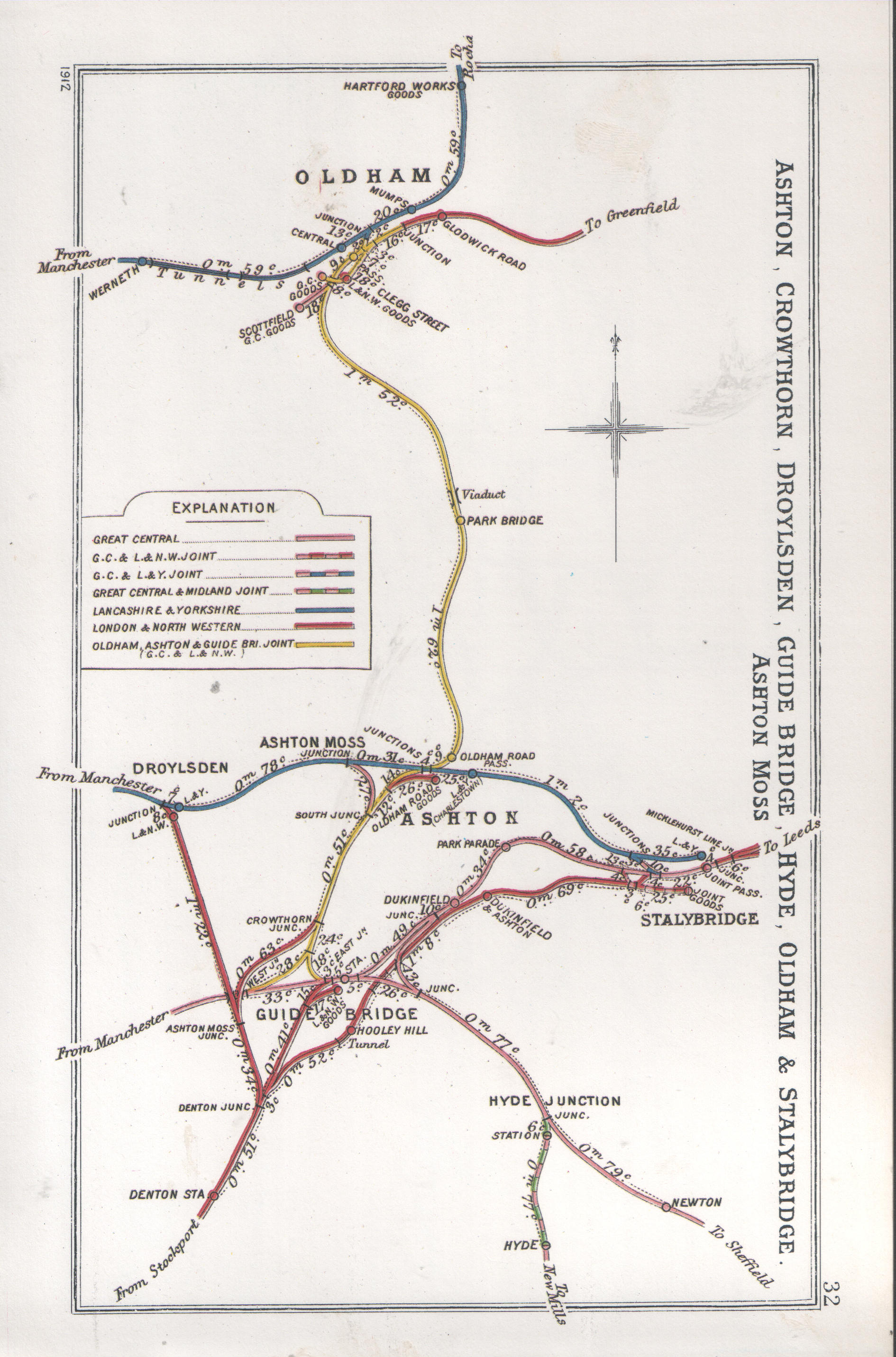
A 1912 Railway Clearing House map showing the whole of the Oldham, Ashton and Guide Bridge Junction Railway (in yellow) and connecting lines

== Description of the line ==
The line was double track, 6 miles 20 chains (10.1 km) long, connecting end-on with the LNWR near their Oldham Glodwick Road station. (Note: Railways in the United Kingdom are, for historical reasons, measured in miles and chains. A chain is 22 yards (20 m) long, there are 80 chains to the mile.) Most services ran to and from the LNWR Oldham Glodwick Road station where a bay platform was constructed in the 1860s to accommodate them, this platform was rented by the OA&GB.

OA&GB stations were:

- Oldham Clegg Street,
- Park Bridge,
- Ashton Oldham Road, and
- Ashton Moss which closed in 1862.

In the centre of the route, just south of Ashton Oldham Road, the line had running powers over 4 chains (80 m) of L&YR track at Ashton. (Note: The OA&GB had to cross from one side of the L&YR line to the other, sometimes this was known as one junction, OA&GB Junction, sometimes as two, Ashton East and West Junctions. or sometimes simply as track at Ashton.)

The line ended by splitting at Canal Junction and curving to the left and right to form a triangular junction with the MS&LR. The left fork then traversed 5 chains (100 m) of MS&LR track from Stockport Junction (later Guide Bridge Junction) into MS&LR Guide Bridge station. The right fork led onto the MS&LR main line to Manchester London Road at Audenshaw Junction.

There were two short tunnels, the Ashton (Oldham Road) Tunnel of 53 yards (48 m) between Oldham Road station and Park Bridge and Oldham Tunnel of 59 yards (54 m) between Sheepwashes Lane and Clegg Street. (Note: Dow (1962) has Sheepwashers Lane, the OS map of 1882 has Sheepwashes Lane, leading to Sheepwashes.)

In 1876 the LNWR opened a link to Stockport, running south west from Crowthorne Junction (just north of Canal Junction), crossing over the MS&LR main line then south to Denton and Stockport. (Note: The link was called the Guide Bridge Junction Line, at least on the OS maps, despite avoiding Guide Bridge.)

The GCR, as the MS&LR had now become, installed a south to west curve link just north of Ashton Moss, creating a triangular junction with the L&YR, it opened on 18 December 1911.

The canal curve between Canal Junction and Audenshaw Junction was used infrequently and was removed as early as 1938. (Note: Brown (2021) has the date as 1939.)

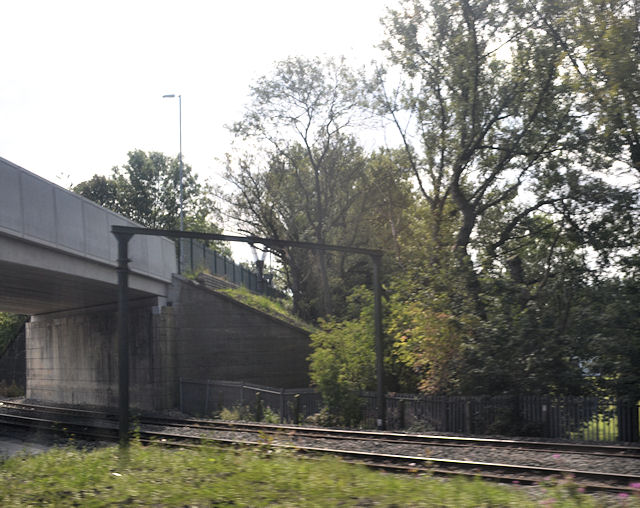
Railway south from Ashton Moss Junction, the catenary masts are prominent although disused.

In 1952 the lower half of the line was electrified between Guide Bridge and Ashton Moss North Junction signal box to facilitate freight trains coming off the Woodhead line.

Whilst most of the former OA&GB line is closed the former GCR line through Guide Bridge and the former L&YR line through Ashton remain open. The remaining section of the OA&GB that is open for freight and occasional diversions is the link from Denton, onto the former OA&GB line through what had been Ashton Moss and taking the south to west curve onto the former GCR line.

== Later management and closure ==
The Manchester, Sheffield and Lincolnshire Railway became the Great Central Railway (GCR) on 1 August 1897, as part of the legal tidying up as a consequence of the change, the Great Central & London & North Western Joint Committee was set up in 1905, to administer various undertakings jointly owned by those two railways, including the OA&GB. The OA&GB was not affected by the grouping of 1923 remaining an independent joint line but now its lease was between the London, Midland and Scottish Railway and the London and North Eastern Railway. In 1948 OA&GB was nationalised and became part of British Railways.

The passenger service was withdrawn on 4 May 1959. At the same time a parcel concentration depot was being built on the goods yard site, it opened shortly after, goods services were withdrawn on 29 January 1968, except for a private siding at Oldham Clegg Street which closed in February 1970. The parcel depot closed in 1982 unable to compete with road traffic.

== Accidents ==
=== 23 October 1874 ===
There was a collision between two trains at Canal Junction caused by a lack of the absolute block system, an absence of punctuality, a signal not working properly and one of the drivers not keeping a good enough look-out.

=== 17 December 1874 ===
There was a collision near Oldham Clegg Street when "a train of passenger carriages without an engine under control of the guard at the rear of the train was being lowered from the up platform when they collided with some loaded coal wagons", two passengers were injured. (Note: The lines out of Oldham Clegg Street station were on a decline through Oldham tunnel, presumably lowered meant propelled by gravity.) The inspecting officer noted that traffic levels had outgrown the station capacity, the railway already had the necessary authority to remedy the situation and should do so.

=== 5 April 1876 ===
There was a collision between a passenger train and a goods train at Oldham Clegg Street. The rear two vehicles of the goods train were derailed when the passenger train ran into the back of it, five passengers were injured but no bones were broken nor lives lost. The inspecting officer concluded the lack of adequate braking, as the passenger train was not fitted with continuous brakes, and a lack of absolute block working were to blame.

=== 21 August 1876 ===
There was a collision between two passenger trains at Oldham Clegg Street. One of the trains was standing in the platform waiting for an engine when the second train was directed to the same platform and they collided, nine passengers were slightly injured.

=== 3 February 1906 ===
There was a collision between two trains at Crowthorne Junction when a passenger train ran into the back of goods train, twelve of the goods train wagons were derailed, ten passengers suffered injury one of which was serious.
