= Delph railway station =

Railway station in Oldham, UK

Delph
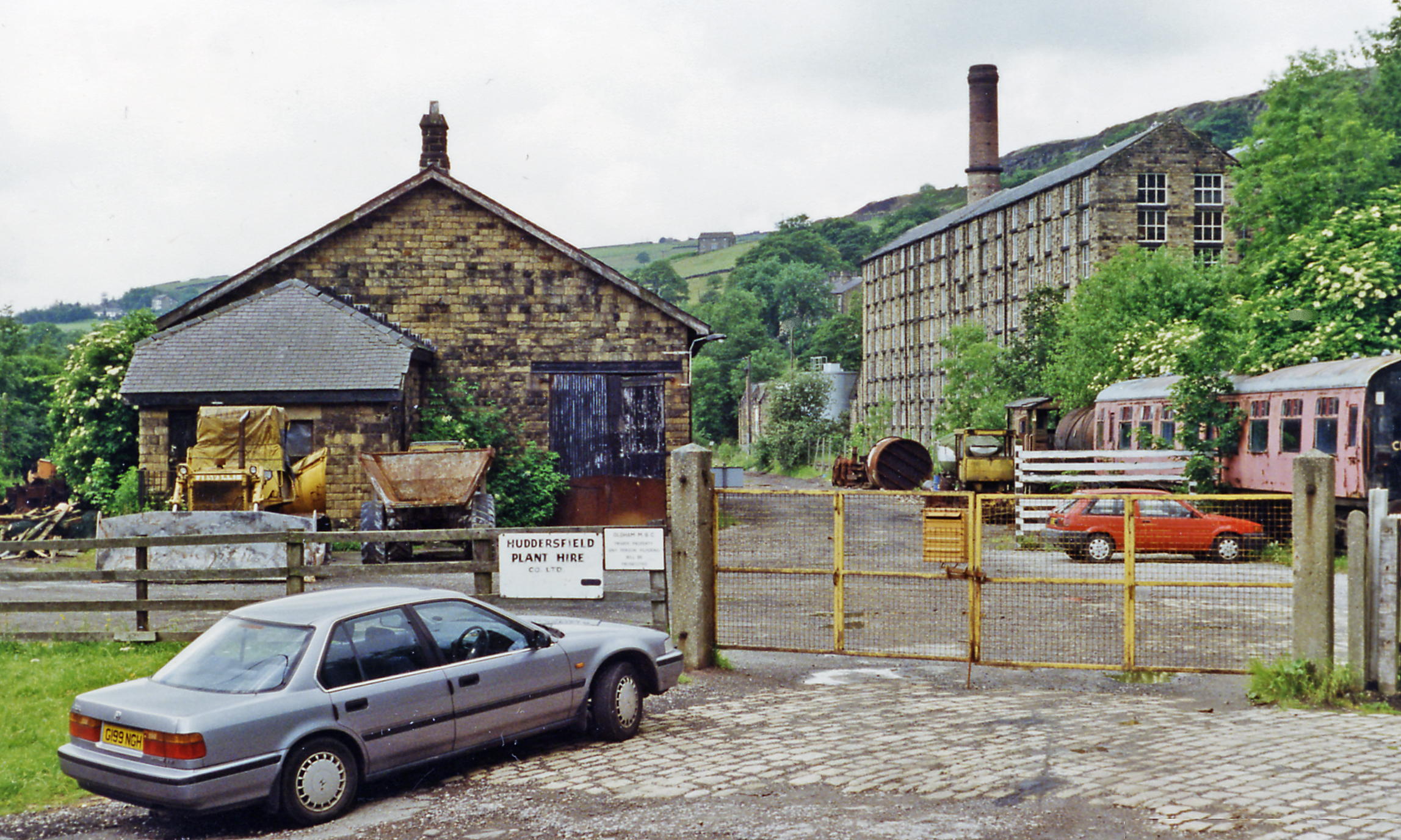
- Remains of the station in 1996 with Bailey Mill to the right

General information
- Location: Delph, Oldham; England
- Coordinates: 53.5634°N 2.0216°W
- Grid reference: SD986074
- Platforms: 1

Other information
- Status: Disused

History
- Original company: London and North Western Railway
- Pre-grouping: London and North Western Railway
- Post-grouping: London, Midland and Scottish Railway

Key dates
- 1 September 1851: Station opened
- 2 May 1955: Station closed
Location

Delph railway station served the village of Delph, Oldham, in what is now Greater Manchester, United Kingdom, between 1851 and 1955.

== History ==
The station was opened on 1 September 1851 as the terminus of the London and North Western Railway branch from Greenfield.

The station closed on 2 May 1955, when the Delph Donkey passenger train service from Oldham to Delph via Greenfield was withdrawn. The station building (complete with platform) still survives as a private residence, now much hemmed in by later development.

For a period after closure, the station yard became home to a small, privately owned collection of railway rolling stock, including two steam locomotives. The locomotives were a Hunslet 0-6-0ST Darfield No.1, built in 1953, and a Hunslet 0-6-0ST Brookes No. 1, built in 1941. Other stock consisted of a British Railways Mark 1 bogie coach, an oil tank wagon and a goods brake van. Both locomotives have gone on to enjoy useful lives on preserved lines, but the coach and wagons were cut up on site.

One of the major features of the station was the Bailey Mill, located adjacent to the station building. The mill had been derelict since ceasing production in 1996. Evidence of the railway line still existed in front of the mill. The mill was gutted by fire in 2016 and was subsequently demolished. A 16-year-old boy was arrested on suspicion of arson.

Preceding station	Disused railways	Following station
Measurements Halt; Line and station closed	L&NW; Delph Donkey	Terminus
