= Oldham Clegg Street railway station =

Former railway station in England

Oldham Clegg Street

General information
- Location: Oldham, Oldham; England
- Coordinates: 53.53782°N 2.10958°W
- Grid reference: SD 928 046
- Platforms: 4

Other information
- Status: Disused

History
- Original company: Oldham, Ashton and Guide Bridge Junction Railway (OA&GB)
- Pre-grouping: OA&GB
- Post-grouping: OA&GB

Key dates
- 26 August 1861: Opened
- 4 May 1959: Closed to passengers
- 29 January 1968: Closed to freight
Location

Oldham Clegg Street railway station was the Oldham, Ashton-under-Lyne and Guide Bridge Junction Railway station that served the town of Oldham in northwest England, it had three associated goods stations.

== Passenger station ==
The station was the northernmost passenger station belonging to the Oldham, Ashton-under-Lyne and Guide Bridge Junction Railway (OA&GB). It opened on 26 August 1861 when the OA&GB opened its line to here from Guide Bridge. (Note: The Oldham, Ashton-under-Lyne and Guide Bridge Junction Railway was the full name of the railway as defined in its enabling Act, it was often shortened by the omission of -under-Lyne and Junction.)

The station was located to the north of Sheepwashes Lane and tunnel at the end of Clegg Street which ran over the Lancashire and Yorkshire Railway (L&YR) and then over the OA&GB to terminate after the station on its south eastern side. (Note: Dow (1962) has Sheepwashers Lane, the OS map of 1882 has Sheepwashes Lane, leading to Sheepwashes.)

The station was in a deep cutting to the north of Clegg Street with some of the buildings at road level, the main platform was 270 feet (82 m) longwith a bay platform at the Ashton end, there was also an island platform with tracks on both sides. There was an overall roof from the station buildings towards the northeast, a refreshment room was provided, the only station in Oldham to have one. By 1866 the L&YR's Oldham Central station was built immediately adjacent to the station, immediately before the junction between the two lines.

The OA&GB parcels office was located to the north of the station between it and Central station, an enclosed ramp was provided access from the booking office. Access to the platforms was from a footbridge attached to the northeast side of Clegg Road overbridge.

The station was rebuilt between 1899 and 1901 following a request by the Oldham Town Clerk in 1889. The modifications involved re-constructing the Clegg Street overbridge, new platforms, a milk bridge leading to a loading stage, the bridge was provided with hydraulic lifts, there were luggage lifts installed in the main building.

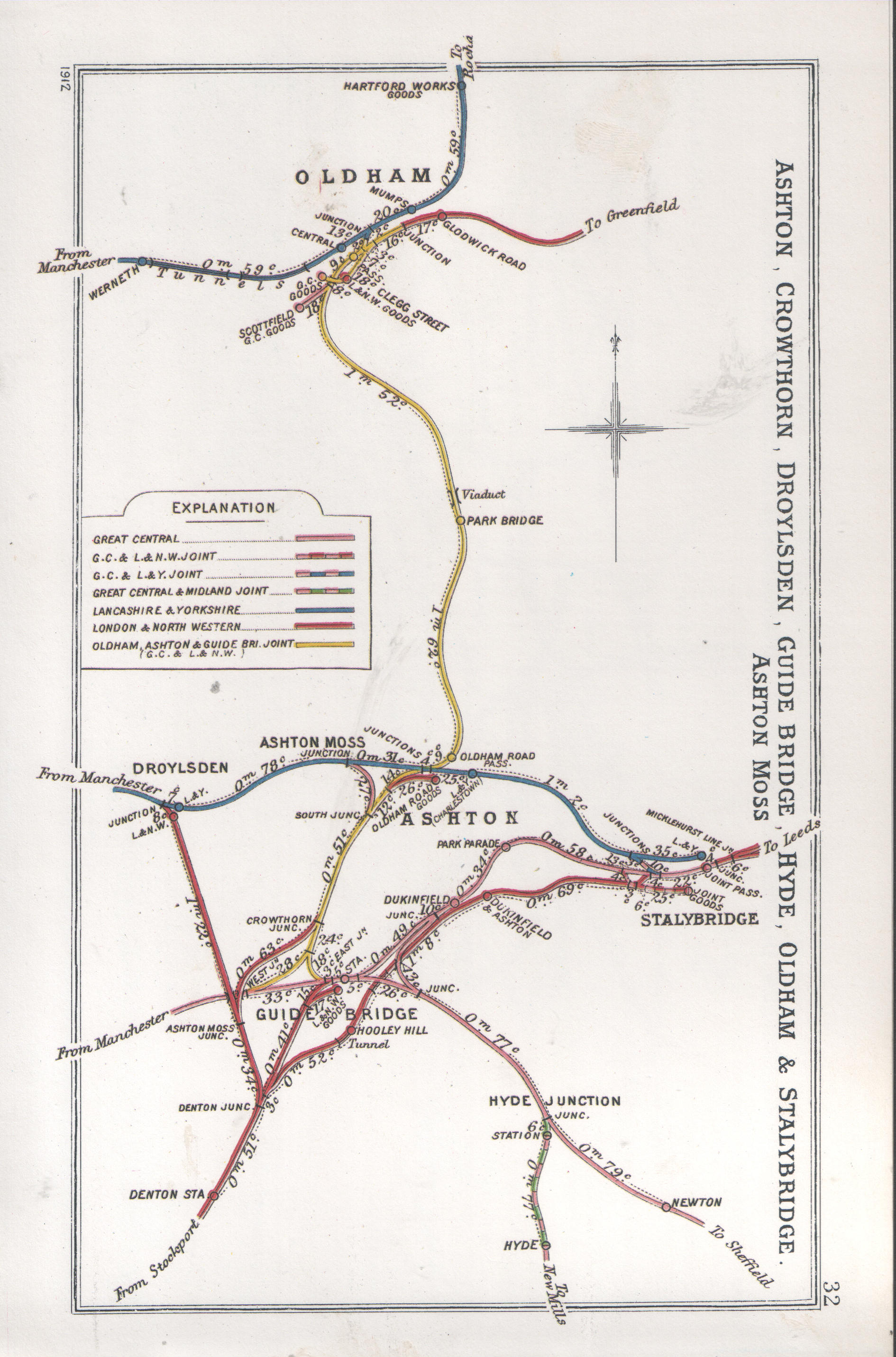
A 1912 Railway Clearing House map of railways in the vicinity of Oldham Clegg Street

=== Services ===
In 1861 the station was served by twelve trains in each direction, with five services each way on Sundays. The trains mostly ran through to Manchester London Road usually via Guide Bridge where the trains reversed, two or three trains ran direct to Manchester, avoiding Guide Bridge and a similar number terminated at Guide Bridge requiring a change of trains to a connecting service into Manchester.

By 1895 the station had twenty three OA&GB services each way with an extra one on Saturdays. there were eleven services each way on Sundays, all but four of the weekday services continued to Oldham Glodwick Road. In addition there were eight or nine LNWR services to and from, half of these going on to Oldham Glodwick Road and the others to Rochdale via Oldham Mumps, one of the services having a through carriages to London Euston. The station was also the terminus for seventeen weekday (four on Sundays) LNWR services to Greenfield and Delph, all of which went through Glodwick Road.

This service pattern continued without much change, the 1910 timetable shows only minor changes such as one of the through services to Rochdale now continuing to Huddersfield.

In 1922 the station had over thirty services departing daily towards Greenfield, there were around ten services each way to Stockport, for all but three of them passengers were advised to change at Clegg Street for Rochdale. There was still a through carriage each day to and from London Euston. There were about 12 daily OA&GB services each way, mostly running to Manchester London Road via Guide Bridge, one service each way went to Manchester Central, on Sundays there was a through services to Glossop and Marple.

The OA&GB was not affected by the grouping of 1923 remaining an independent joint line leased jointly by the London, Midland and Scottish Railway (LMS) and the London and North Eastern Railway (LNER). Its services were shown in the LMS timetable and whilst there had been some consolidation between the companies they were still operated separately, with OA&GB services being annotated NE. Weekdays had 14 OA&GB services with an additional six on Saturdays, LMS had eleven with an additional three on Saturdays, there was still one daily through carriage to and from London.

== Goods stations ==
There were three goods stations associated with Clegg Street station, one OA&GB, one LNWR (later LMS) and one MS&LR (later GCR then LNER).

The first one to be constructed appears to be the MS&LR one as it is the only one present on the 1882 OS map, this was located at the end of a branch that ran back from the OA&GB line, crossing the line to be between the OA&GB and L&YR lines, it ran alongside Sheepwashes Lane but appears to have been accessed from Wellington Street. This goods station was able to accommodate most types of goods including live stock, it was equipped with a ten-ton crane. The warehouse was of two-storeys until it burnt down just before the First World War.

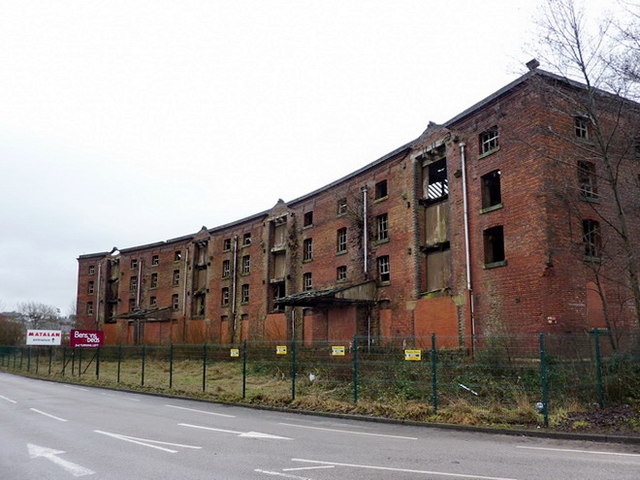
LNWR goods warehouse, Oldham Clegg Street prior to demolition

By 1894 there were three goods sheds, the second one belonging to the LNWR, this station was located on the bend of the branch that led to the MS&LR shed, before the branch crossed the OA&GB line. It was an unusually curved structure with four covered hoists, and was similarly able to accommodate most types of goods including live stock, it was equipped with a ten-ton crane. The warehouse was sold to developers in 1993 but continued to deteriorate until it was demolished in 2012.

The third goods shed is also shown on the 1894 map, this one is located on the inside of the curved branch, it is the OA&GB one shown on the map as a joint concern (between the LNWR and the MS&LR), later photographs show this as an open-sided hipped-roof tranship shed.

== Closure ==
The passenger service was withdrawn on 4 May 1959. At the same time a parcel concentration depot was being built on the goods yard site, it opened shortly after, goods services were withdrawn on 29 January 1968, except for a private siding at Clegg Street which closed in February 1970. The parcel depot closed in 1982 unable to compete with road traffic.

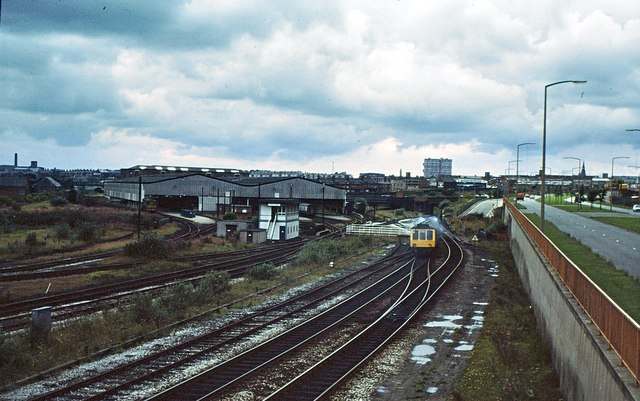
Oldham railway parcels depot 1978

Preceding station	Disused railways	Following station
Park Bridge; Line and station closed	Oldham, Ashton and Guide Bridge Railway Leased jointly by L&NW & GC	Terminus
Park Bridge; Line and station closed	Lancashire and Yorkshire Railway; Oldham & Rochdale branch	Oldham Mumps; Line and station closed
Park Bridge; Line and station closed	London and North Western Railway; Oldham branch	Oldham Glodwick Road; Line and station closed
