= Greenfield railway station =

Railway station in Greater Manchester, England

Greenfield
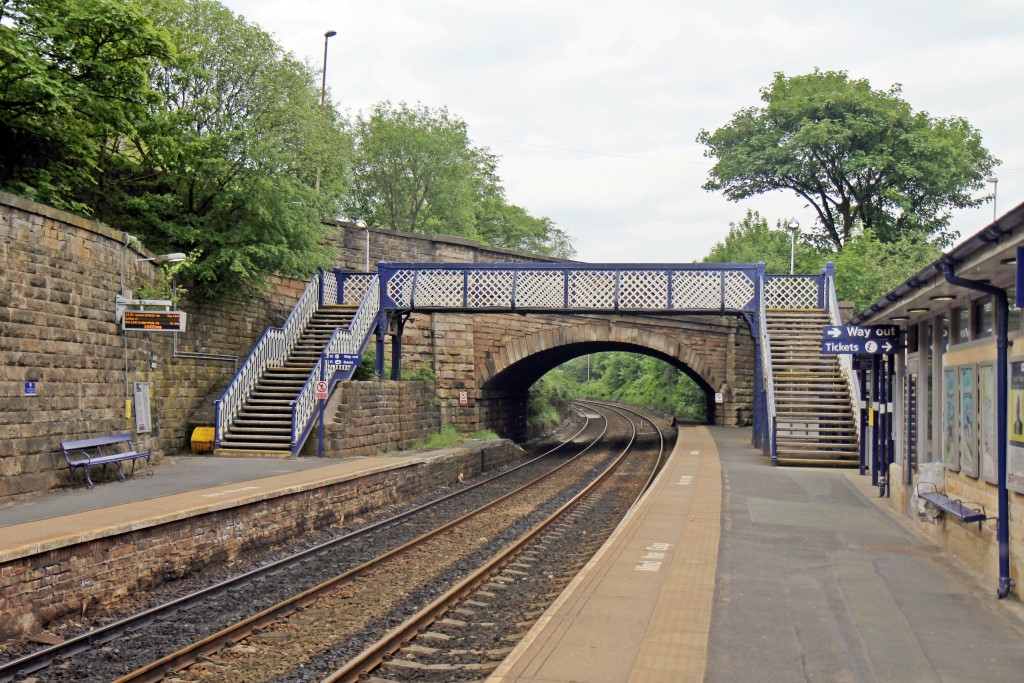
- Greenfield station, 2014

General information
- Location: Greenfield, Metropolitan Borough of Oldham, England
- Coordinates: 53.5388°N 2.0142°W
- Grid reference: SD991046
- Managed by: Northern Trains
- Transit authority: Transport for Greater Manchester
- Platforms: 2
- Train operators: TransPennine Express

Other information
- Station code: GNF
- Classification: DfT category E

History
- Original company: London and North Western Railway
- Pre-grouping: London and North Western Railway
- Post-grouping: London, Midland and Scottish Railway

Key dates
- 1 August 1849: Station opened
- 1 September 1851: Delph branch opened
- 5 July 1856: Oldham branch opened
- November 1963: Oldham and Delph branches closed

Passengers
- 2020/21: ▼84,746
- 2021/22: ▲0.279 million
- 2022/23: ▼0.247 million
- 2023/24: ▲0.255 million
- 2024/25: ▲0.351 million
Location
Notes
- Passenger statistics from the Office of Rail and Road

Greenfield railway station serves the village of Greenfield, in Greater Manchester, England. It is a stop on the Huddersfield Line, 12 miles (20 km) north-east of Manchester Victoria. It is the final station in Greater Manchester before the boundary with West Yorkshire. It is managed by Northern Trains, although only TransPennine Express trains call at this station.

The station is located near to the reservoirs of Dovestone and Chew, as well as the whole of Chew Valley in the Peak District National Park.

== History ==
The line through Greenfield was constructed by the Huddersfield and Manchester Railway, which was absorbed by the London and North Western Railway on 9 July 1847, before any of it was opened. The section between Huddersfield and Stalybridge was opened on 1 August 1849; the station at Greenfield was opened the same day.

On 1 September 1851, the branch to Delph opened, which left the main line at Delph Junction, about a mile to the north of Greenfield; this was the last station before the junction, until Moorgate Halt opened in 1912. A second branch, to Oldham, opened on 5 July 1856; it left the main line just to the south of Greenfield.

Passenger services on the Delph & Oldham branches were withdrawn in May 1955, with complete closure following in 1964. A former bay platform can still be seen at the Stalybridge end of the station, which was used by some trains from the Oldham direction. For many years, the station had a peak-only service (see BR timetable 1974 et seq.).

The Beeching Report proposed closure of all stations between Stalybridge and Huddersfield. In 1968, the government closed only half of the stations, including Diggle and Saddleworth, leaving only Greenfield to serve the area.

From 1968, the station's services were reduced drastically to just a handful of journeys to Manchester and Huddersfield at peak times only, in line with the other local stations on the Huddersfield Line at the time. From 1991, however, a new improved hourly stopping service in each direction was introduced, with hourly trains between Manchester Victoria and Huddersfield.

== Facilities ==
The ticket office is staffed on a part-time basis (Mondays to Saturdays, morning to early afternoon only) and there is also a ticket vending machine available. Step-free access is limited to the Manchester-bound platform only, as the Huddersfield-bound one can only be reached by footbridge.

Planning permission for the refurbishment of the station was granted in early 2008. This was to provide a new ticket office, refurbished waiting areas, toilets and a small shop; it was due to be completed in the winter of 2008. After some problems with planning regulations and the original building contractor going into administration, the new facilities were finally completed in spring 2009.

Greater Manchester mayor Andy Burnham has been campaigning for Greenfield station to have access to disability-friendly facilities, as it remains one of the only stations in Greater Manchester lacking them.

== Services ==
TransPennine Express provides a regular stopping service, with hourly trains in each direction between Manchester Piccadilly, Huddersfield, Wakefield Kirkgate and York; there are additional services at peak times.

Preceding station	National Rail	Following station
Mossley	TransPennine Express; North TransPennine; Huddersfield Line	Marsden
	Disused railways	
Grasscroft; Line and station closed	L&NW; Delph Donkey Line	Moorgate Halt; Line open, station closed
Mossley; Line and station open	L&NW; Huddersfield Line	Saddleworth; Line open, station closed

== Future ==
The Transpennine route through the station is being modernised and upgraded over the course of three control periods extending beyond 2029. It is planned that electrification of the line through the station will occur as part of the upgrade.

== Gallery ==
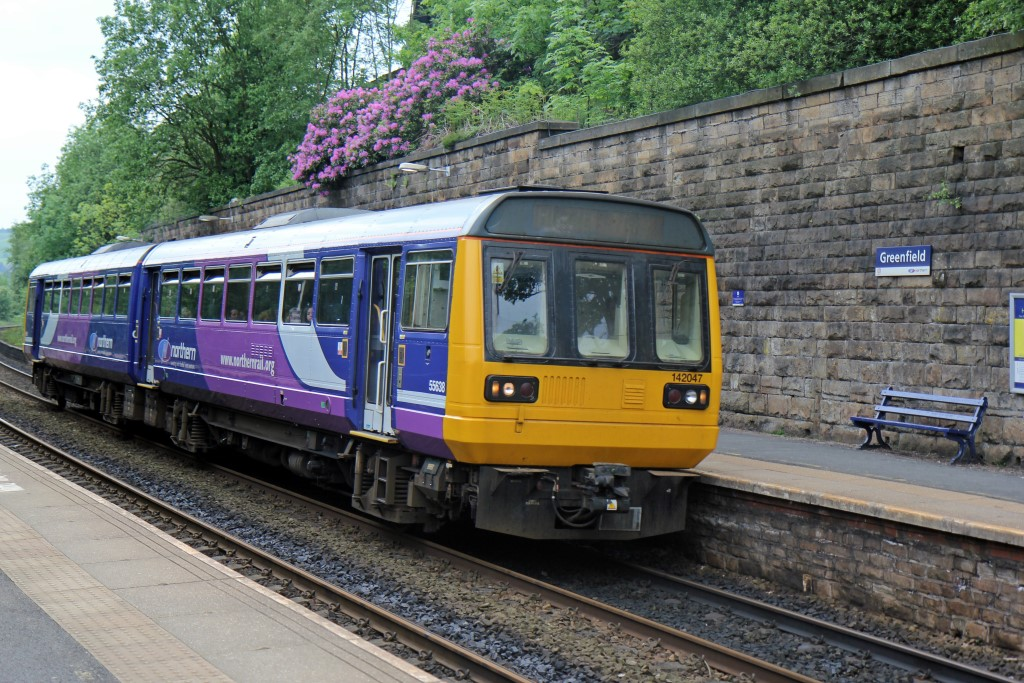
A Northern Rail Class 142 at the station.

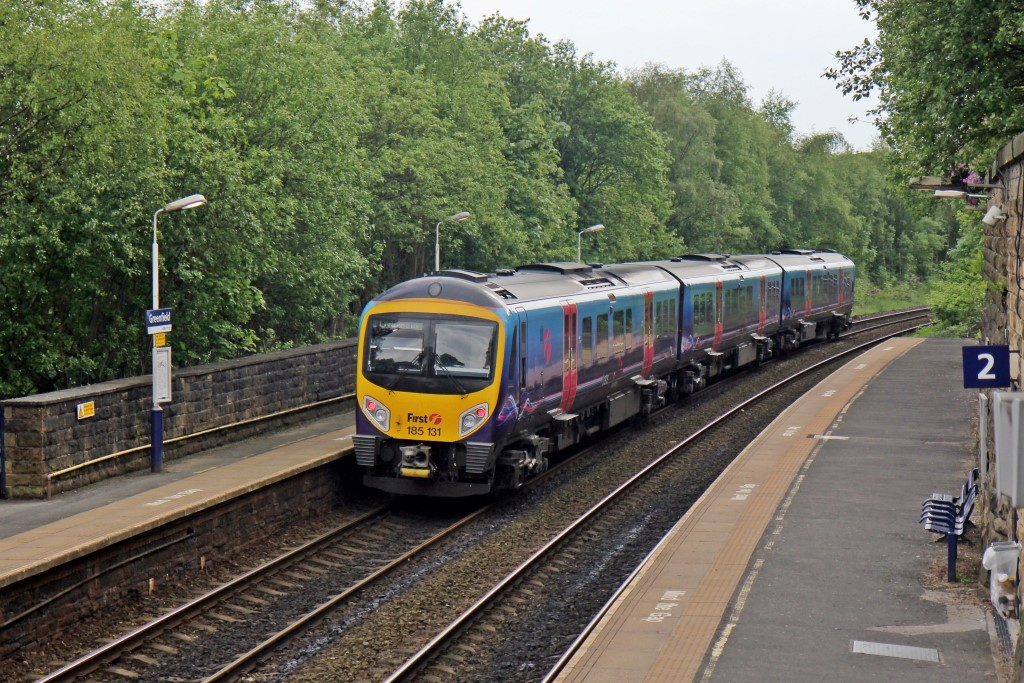
A First TransPennine Express Class 185 passes through the station.

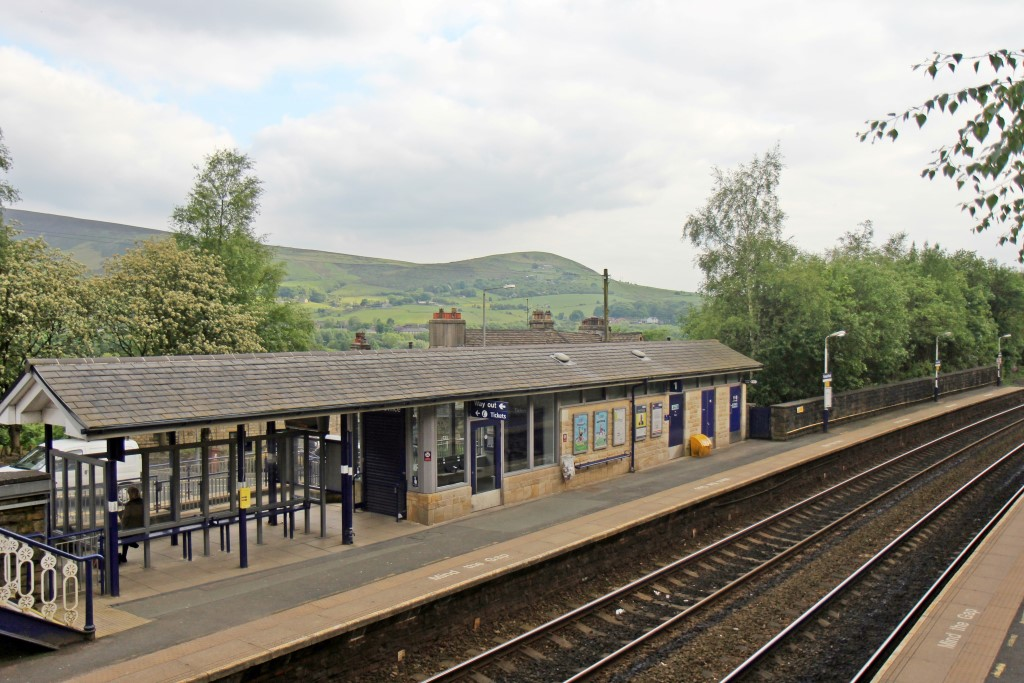
The station building, on the Manchester-bound platform.

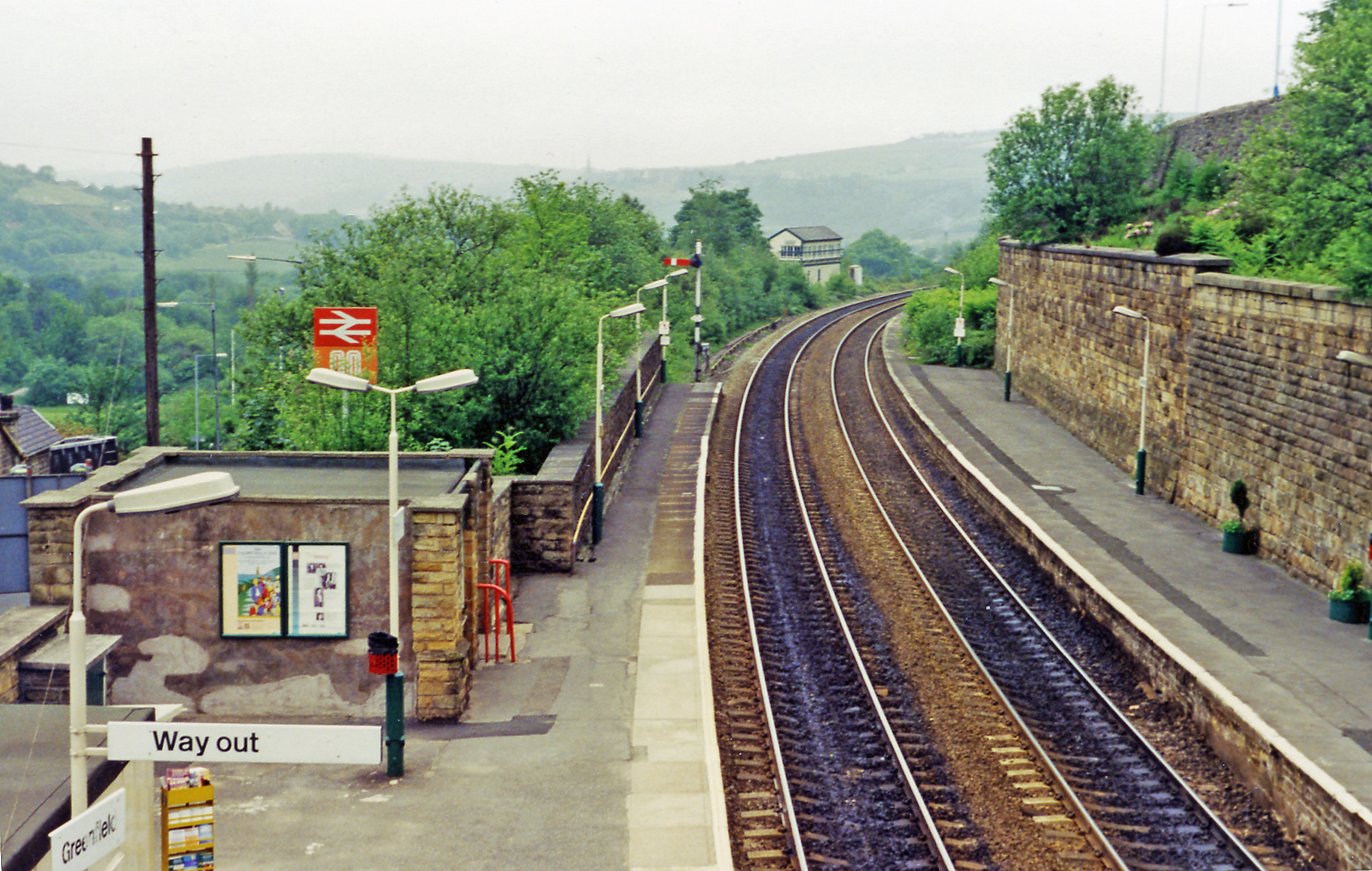
The station in 1996.
