= Delph Donkey =

The Delph Donkey was a line of the London and North Western Railway (LNWR) in northern England, which opened in 1849 to connect Oldham, Greenfield and Delph to the main Huddersfield to Manchester line.

== Route ==
Two of the Saddleworth villages, Delph and Greenfield, are on the western slopes of the Pennine Hills. The branch followed the main cross-country line between Manchester and Huddersfield as far as Delph Junction, set above the village of Uppermill.

Just before the junction was Moorgate Halt. Although it was situated on the main line, it was only ever used by trains to Delph. The Delph branch then left the main line and veered sharply left past Ladcastle Quarry before reaching Dobcross halt. It then continued to Delph with one additional intermediate halt that served the "Measurements" factory on Delph New Road, where trains only called at the start and end of the working day. The line terminated at Delph, where a private siding served Messrs Mallalieu's Bailey Mill. There was also a goods shed and coal staithes serving local business.

Delph was the only station on the line beyond Moorgate with permanent structures, and the station building still survives as a private residence (as does Grotton & Springhead station). Services ran to and from Oldham via Greenfield, with connections to several other destinations, and summer specials usually ran to coastal resorts.

== Origin of the name ==
The line took its name from a claim that the original service on the railway was a carriage drawn by a donkey. However, Gordon Suggitt states in his book, Lost Railways of Merseyside & Greater Manchester, that it has never been proven that there was a donkey or horse-drawn service on the line. Since trains on the branch worked onto the main Manchester to Huddersfield line, it is unlikely horse-drawn trains would have been permitted.

== Closure ==
Passenger trains ceased running on the Delph Donkey in April 1955, although a limited number of freight trains continued to use the line until November 1963. The track was lifted in 1964 to turn the line between Oldham and Grotton into a cycle and walk way. The line between Moorgate and Delph became the Delph Donkey Trail footpath and bridleway, on which the halts at Dobcross and Measurements are now marked by replica station nameboards. The section of the railway between Greenfield and Grotton was either abandoned as waste land or converted into small footpaths. A section of the line that ran below Grasscroft through Friezland is now part of a large housing estate.

As of 2012, old pieces of track, that had not been moved since the closure almost 50 years before, remained outside Bailey Mill at the old Delph terminus.

In March 2020, a bid was made to the Restoring Your Railway fund to get funds for a feasibility study into reinstating the line between Oldham and Greenfield. The bid was unsuccessful.

== Lydgate Tunnel ==
The tunnel, running underneath Lydgate, connected Grasscroft and Grotton, and is still completely intact and maintained, but it is unused and completely inaccessible. After lifting the track and deciding the future use of the new available land, it was felt that it would be too costly and dangerous to collapse or infill the tunnel, especially as there were more structures above the tunnel, such as housing, than there had been when the tunnel was built in the mid-19th century. Minor work was carried out in the 1980s, as part of a planned maintenance programme, which in-filled the centre air vent to avoid any subsidence.

In 2008, 44 years after the tunnel had been last used, a routine inspection revealed some areas of loose and hollow brickwork in the tunnel lining. Routine maintenance work to rectify that was carried out by BRB (Residuary) Limited, with substantial areas of the tunnel lining being replaced with new brickwork, incorporating drainage pipes and other securing works. News of the inspection and remedial work led to concern by some local people that the tunnel was near to collapse, but BRB(R) stated that was never a risk, and the work was just on-going planned maintenance.
