= Cross keys =

Cross Keys or Crosskeys may refer to:

== Places ==
=== United Kingdom ===
- Crosskeys, Wales
  - Crosskeys railway station
  - Crosskeys College, a campus of Coleg Gwent
- Walpole Cross Keys, formerly Crosskeys or Cross Keys, a village and civil parish in Norfolk, England
  - Cross Keys Bridge, also known as Crosskeys Bridge, a swing bridge nearby in Lincolnshire, England

=== United States ===
(by state then city):

- Cross Keys, Delaware
- Cross Keys, Georgia, now part of Brookhaven, Georgia
  - Cross Keys High School
- Cross Keys, Lexington, Kentucky
- Crosskeys, Louisiana
- Village of Cross Keys, Baltimore, Maryland
- Cross Keys, New Jersey
  - Cross Keys Airport
- Cross Keys, Adams County, Pennsylvania
- Cross Keys, Blair County, Pennsylvania
- Cross Keys, South Carolina
- Cross Keys, Virginia

== Hospitality ==
- The Cross Keys, Beverley, a pub in the East Riding of Yorkshire, England
- The Cross Keys, Chelsea, a pub in London, England
- The Cross Keys, Covent Garden, a pub in London
- Cross Keys, Dagenham, a pub in London
- Cross Keys Inn, Delph, a listed former pub in Greater Manchester, England
- Cross Keys, Dringhouses, a listed pub in North Yorkshire, England
- The Cross Keys, Hammersmith, a pub in London
- The Cross Keys, Malton, a pub in North Yorkshire
- Cross Keys Inn, Odd Down, a pub-restaurant in Somerset, England
- The Cross Keys, Totternhoe, a pub in Bedfordshire, England
- Cross Keys Inn, Uppermill, a listed pub in Greater Manchester
- Cross Keys, York, a listed pub in North Yorkshire
- Crossed Keys Tavern, a historic stone building in Ohio, United States
- Crosskeys Inn, a pub in County Antrim, Northern Ireland
- In hotels, a Concierge may often be seen wearing a lapel pin with the insignia of two crossed keys

== Other ==
- The crossed Keys of Heaven, the symbol of Saint Peter, an element in:
  - Papal regalia and insignia
  - the Coat of arms of the Holy See
  - the arms used by the Guild of Cathedral Vergers
- The symbol of Peterhouse Boat Club in Cambridge, England
- A symbol on the arms of St Peter's College, Oxford
- Battle of Cross Keys, in the American Civil War
- Cross Keys RFC, a Welsh rugby union team and the symbol of the team
- Coat of arms of Luleå Municipality in northern Sweden
