= Bath College (English public school) =

Defunct public school in England

Location
- Bath, Somerset; United Kingdom

Information
- School type: Public School
- Established: 1878
- Founder: Thomas William Dunn
- Closed: 1909
- Gender: Boys

Bath College was a public school in Bath, Somerset, in existence from 1878 to 1909. It was founded by Thomas William Dunn (1837–1930), previously an assistant master at Clifton College, who was headmaster from 1878 to 1897.

The school's premises were on North Road, Bath. They had been built in 1835, as a private residence for Augustus Andrew who had been an army officer in India, named "Vellore House", to a design by John Pinch the younger. A later owner was the Rev. Charles Kemble, who died in 1874.

In 1890 a chapel was erected at Bath College and was opened by the Lord Bishop in May of that year. The chapel building was built on the old playground adjoining the Head Master's residence and was in the Grecian style of architecture to correspond with the front of the College and Head Master's residence. Following the school's closure many of the pews from the chapel were installed to provide additional seating in St Luke's Church, South Lyncombe in 1913 and the pulpit and reading desk from the chapel were donated to St Phillip's Mission Church, Odd Down in 1914.

The school closed down in 1909, and subsequently the building was sold and refurbished, opening as the Bath Hydro Hotel in 1913. By 1914 the directors of the hotel decided that the name was misleading and changed it to become the Bath Spa Hotel.
