= Higher Kinders =

Listed building in Greater Manchester, England

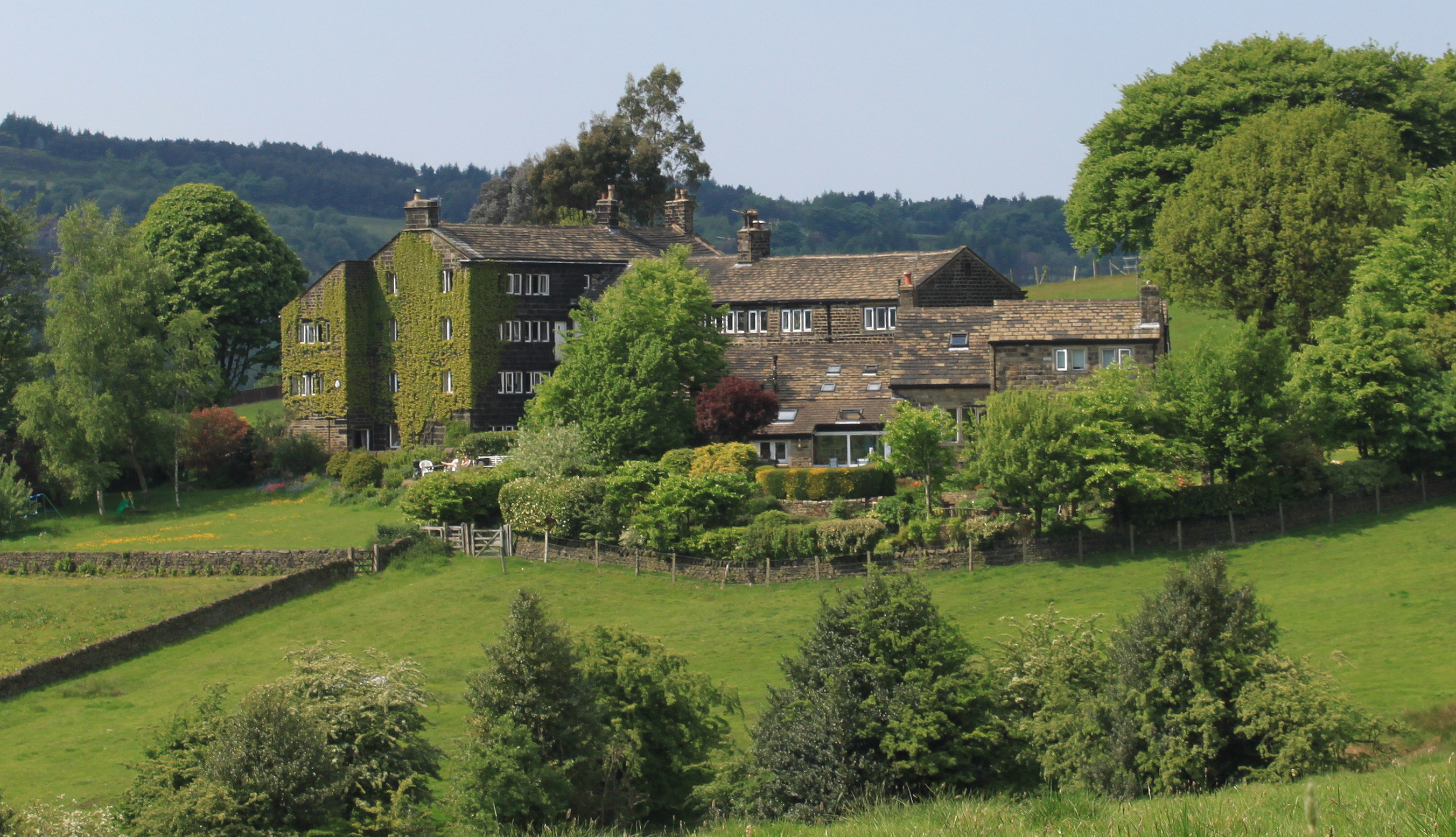
- The cottages in 2014

- Location within Greater Manchester
- Alternative names: Nos. 1–5 Kinders Lane

General information
- Location: Kinders Lane, Saddleworth, Greater Manchester, England
- Coordinates: 53.5386°N 2.0014°W
- Year built: Mid-18th to early 19th century
- Renovated: 20th century (added)

Listed Building – Grade II*
- Official name: Higher Kinders
- Designated: 19 June 1967
- Reference no.: 1068176

Higher Kinders is a Grade II* listed group of cottages on Kinders Lane in the civil parish of Saddleworth, within the Metropolitan Borough of Oldham, Greater Manchester, England. Historically part of the West Riding of Yorkshire, the properties are situated near Uppermill and Greenfield, on the western slopes of the South Pennines.

== History ==
The buildings are believed to originate from the mid-18th to early 19th century, reflecting Saddleworth's combined rural and industrial character during a period when many dwellings were adapted for domestic textile production in the Industrial Revolution. A datestone inscribed "1642" indicates the possibility of earlier construction.

On 19 June 1967, Higher Kinders was designated a Grade II* listed building.

== Architecture ==
Higher Kinders is arranged in a large T-shaped plan and constructed in hammer-dressed stone, partly watershot, with a graduated stone-slate roof. The building reflects the vernacular architecture of Saddleworth.

The west range, forming the head of the T, incorporates the earliest work. It is four storeys in height, with three bays, and has undergone extensions and alterations over time. The structure includes former loom workshops and a barn.

Windows vary in size and style, featuring recessed chamfered cavetto-moulded mullions in groups of three, four, and seven lights, alongside flat-faced stone mullions in configurations of four, five, six, seven, and ten lights. Architectural details include an eaves cornice and ridge chimney stacks with cornices.

The east range, forming the stem of the T, is three storeys, single-depth, and four bays long. It contains flat-faced mullion windows of two to ten lights, opposed cart entrances with segmental keystone arches, and an owl hole in the gable. A flight of cantilevered stone steps rises within the angle of the T, providing access to former loom shops on the second floors of both ranges. Later additions include a 20th-century porch to No. 5 and shaped eaves gutter brackets.

== Location ==
The surrounding area is characterised by moorland and valleys, forming part of the Pennine landscape, with the Huddersfield Narrow Canal and River Tame nearby.

== See also ==
- Grade II* listed buildings in Greater Manchester
- Listed buildings in Saddleworth from 1800
