= Thomas Stride =

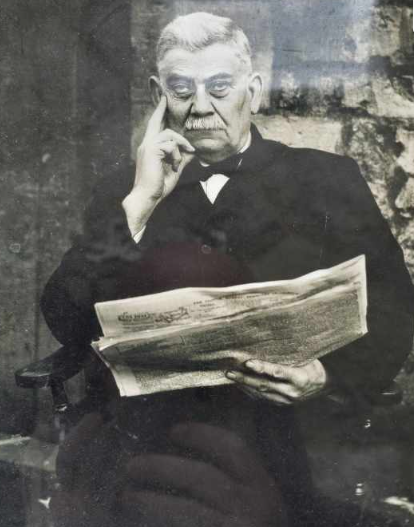

Rural District Councillor for Combe Hay
- In office 1893–1927

Chairman of the Bath Board of Guardians
- In office 1922–1923

Personal details
- Born: July 1851 Englishcombe, Somerset
- Died: 14 May 1927 (aged 75) Bath, Somerset
- Resting place: Locksbrook Cemetery, Bath
- Party: Conservative Unionist
- Spouse(s): Elizabeth Ann Stride; Francis Emma Stride
- Profession: Brewer, publican, officeholder

Thomas Stride (July 1851 – 14 May 1927) was a noted brewer and officeholder in Bath, Somerset who served as chairman of the Bath Board of Guardians and represented Combe Hay on the Bath Rural District Council.

== Early life ==
Thomas Stride was born in July 1851 in Englishcombe, Somerset, to Thomas Stride Sr. (1795–1875) and Ann Bond (1814–1898). Thomas Sr. was a gamekeeper in Englishcombe for many years.

== Brewer ==
In 1870, Thomas Stride opened the Burnt House Brewery in Odd Down. He later owned and operated the Albion Brewery and Oxford Brewery in Bath.

He was a longtime member of the Bath Licensed Victuallers' Association, being one of the trustees, and on his death was the oldest licensed victualler in the city. He was the only man in Bath to hold three licenses at the same time.

== Local Office ==
Besides being a prominent brewer, Stride was involved in local political matters in Bath. He was elected as the councillor for Combe Hay in 1893, representing that parish in the Bath Rural District Council for 34 years, serving as vice chairman of the District Council in 1900. He also served as chairman of the Finance Committee.

Stride was long involved in the city Board of Guardians, serving as chairman from 1922 to 1923, and was the oldest member of the board.

Beside his local involvement, Stride was a staunch Conservative, working for and supporting the campaigns of Lord Alexander Thynne in the early 1900s.

== Family ==
In 1871, Thomas Stride married his second cousin, Elizabeth Ann Stride (1850–1897), daughter of William Stride (1805–1859) and Maria Edwards (1808–1882). The couple had nine children:

- Rosina Stride (1872–1929)
- Charles Thomas Stride (1873–1946)
- Florence Louisa Stride (1875–1943)
- John Thomas Stride (1879–1912)
- Elizabeth Stride (1880–)
- Caroline Stride (1882–)
- Beatrice Stride (1884–)
- William Russell Stride (1888–1961)
- Margaret Lavinia Stride (1890–1979)

In 1898, he remarried to Francis Emma Stride (1870–1914).

His sons Charles, John, and William were also prominent brewers in Bath.
