= Crossed Keys Tavern =

- U.S. National Register of Historic Places
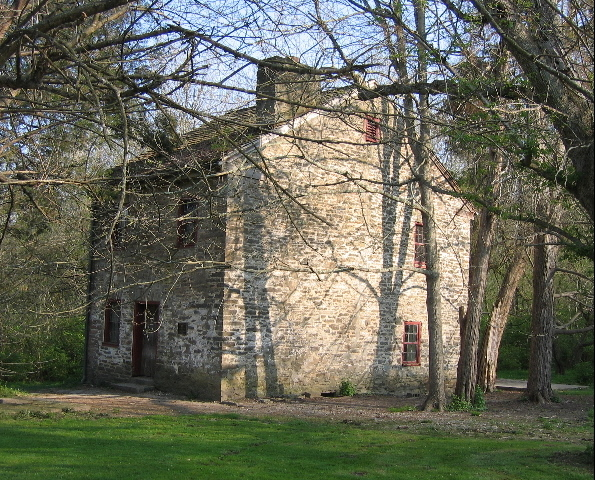
- Crossed Keys Tavern

- Location within Ohio Location within the United States
- Nearest city: Lebanon, Ohio
- Coordinates: 39°24′24″N 84°6′12″W
- Built: 1802
- Architect: Benjamin Rue
- NRHP reference No.: 76001542
- Added to NRHP: October 21, 1976

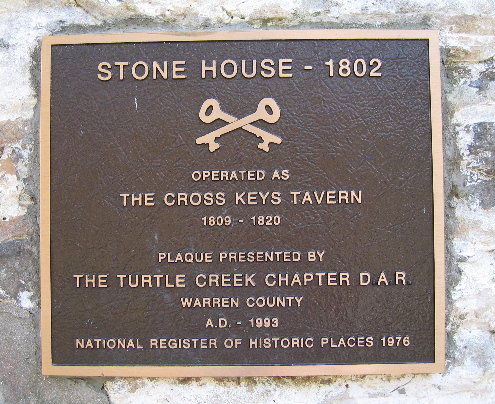
National Register of Historic Places plaque mounted on front of building

The Crossed Keys Tavern, also known as the Cross Keys Tavern, is a historic stone building located in Turtlecreek Township near Lebanon, Ohio. It is across the Little Miami River from the former Fort Ancient village. Built in 1802, it was operated as a tavern from 1809–1820.

On October 21, 1976, it was added to the National Register of Historic Places.

== See also ==
- List of Registered Historic Places in Warren County, Ohio
- Cross keys (disambiguation)
