= Cross Keys Inn, Odd Down =

Pub in Bath, Somerset, England

Cross Keys Inn
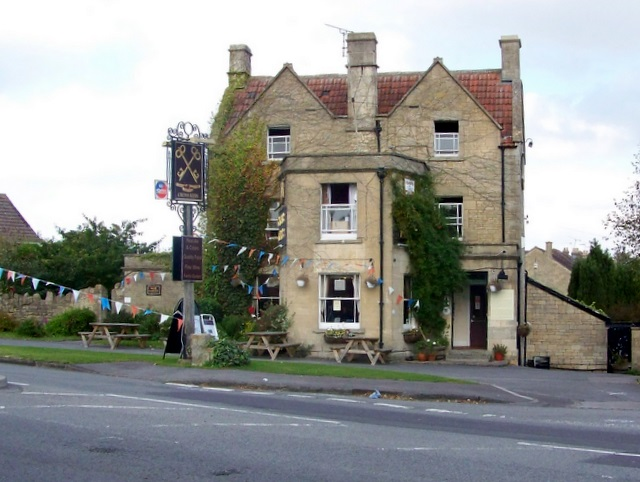

- Location within Somerset
- 51°21′20″N 2°21′49″W
- Location: Odd Down, Bath, England

History
- Built: Late 17th or early 18th century

Listed Building – Grade II
- Official name: Cross Keys Inn
- Designated: 11 August 1972
- Reference no.: 1395715

The Cross Keys Inn is a pub-restaurant and former coaching inn, trading since before 1750, on a corner of Midford Road in Odd Down, Bath, Somerset, England.

It is a Grade II listed building.

== History ==
The current building was erected in the late 17th or early 18th century. The site was owned by Bath Priory until the Dissolution of the Monasteries. It was then owned by Hugh Sexey. An inn is known to have stood on the site in 1718 when it is described in a document as "a new erected tenement or dwelling house...now a Public House on Odwood Down". At that time, the lease cost forty-two pounds and there was an annual rent charge of one pound ten shillings. In the mid 18th century the lease was held by Ralph Allen who was the postmaster of Bath and made a fortune by reforming the postal delivery system. The inn was situated strategically on a crossroads, with major roads going to Bristol, Warminster, Bath and Wells. It served as a coaching inn.

The front of the building was altered in the 19th century. Sexey's Hospital was the owner until 1896 when it was sold to Oakhill Brewery. It remained under the control of breweries or pub management companies until 2014, when the freehold was purchased privately. It is now a free house and restaurant.

== Architecture ==
The building has late seventeenth century or early eighteenth century origins, and was extensively modified in the second half of the nineteenth century. It was built out of squared off rubble stone and has a roof of Roman style tiles. Originally the building was a single room deep with two gable ends and a stair at the centre of the rear wall. It had coped front and end gables, with cross saddle-stones, and an ashlar chimney stack at each end. Since then, right and left wings have been added to the building at the rear and an ashlar extension with entrance added at the front. The building consists of three storeys and a cellar, the front extension is two storeys high and has a flat roof. There is a central tall chimney stack at the front, between the two gable ends. The interior of the building is reported to have an original staircase and fireplace.

== See also ==
- Crosskeys Inn, an 18th century pub and Grade B1 listed building in Northern Ireland
