= Listed buildings in Saddleworth from 1800 =

Saddleworth is a civil parish in the Metropolitan Borough of Oldham, Greater Manchester, England. It lies between the town of Oldham and the Pennine hills, and it is largely rural, with agricultural land and moorland. It also includes suburban areas to the east of Oldham. The principal settlements are Austerlands, Delph, Denshaw, Diggle, Dobcross, Grasscroft, Greenfield, Grotton, Lydgate, Springhead, and Uppermill. The parish contains 385 listed buildings that are recorded in the National Heritage List for England. Of these, five are listed at Grade II*, the middle grade, and the others are at Grade II, the lowest grade.

Most of the listed buildings are houses and farmhouses, and many have been used as loom workshops and have windows with multiple lights. Almost all the buildings are in stone and have roofs of stone-slate or slate, and the windows are mullioned. The Huddersfield Narrow Canal runs through the parish, and the listed buildings associated with this are bridges, locks, a milestone, and an aqueduct. The other listed buildings include farm buildings, churches and associated structures, village stocks, public houses, bridges, shops, a former mill, milestones, a boundary stone, tenter posts, a railway viaduct, two war memorials, three telephone kiosks, and two sets of pillboxes.

This listed contains the listed buildings dated from 1800.

== Key ==
Grade	Criteria
II*	Particularly important buildings of more than special interest
II	Buildings of national importance and special interest

== Buildings ==
Name and location	Photograph	Date	Notes	Grade
Milestone at SD 9990 0677, Diggle; 53.55747°N 2.00301°W	—	1799–1810	The milestone is on the towpath of the Huddersfield Narrow Canal. It consists of a rectangular stone post with a curved head, and a round indented face inscribed "12 miles".	II
2 Wall Hill Road, Dobcross; 53.55393°N 2.01992°W	—	c. 1800	Originally a toll house, it is in stone with a stone-slate roof. It has two storeys, two bays at the front and one at the side, and a lean-to extension on the left. There is one 20th-century inserted window, and the other windows are mullioned. In the gable is a square recess.	II
2 and 4 Oldham Road, Delph; 53.56398°N 2.02119°W		c. 1800	A pair of stone houses with a stone-slate roof. They have a double-depth plan, four storeys, and each house has one bay. On the ground floor are two doorways, a 20th-century window and a five-light mullioned window. The upper floors each contain two seven-light mullioned windows.	II
Burnedge Bent Farmhouse, Grasscroft; 53.54339°N 2.02971°W	—	c. 1800	A stone farmhouse with shaped eaves gutter brackets, and a slate roof with coped gables. There are two storeys, two bays, a lean-to extension on the right, and a brick porch on the left gable end. The windows are mullioned.	II
Hollin Greave Farmhouse, Dobcross; 53.55748°N 1.99784°W	—	c. 1800	A house with a barn and shippon to the right, in stone with a stone-slate roof that has coped gables and a ball finial. The house has quoins, two storeys and one bay, and against the right gable is a 20th-century garage. The windows are mullioned, and there is a round-headed barn door and a shippon door.	II
Holly Grove House, Diggle; 53.56307°N 1.99476°W	—	c. 1800	A stone house on a projecting plinth, with quoins, string courses, and a slate roof. It has a double-depth plan, three storeys, three bays, and a single-storey wing to the right. Steps lead up to the doorway that has pilasters, a fanlight, and an open pediment. Most of the windows are mullioned, and there is a round-headed window in the gable with impost blocks and a keystone. At the rear is a three-storey stair window with a round head. The wing contains a round-headed doorway with a rusticated surround and a keystone.	II
Manor House and 14 Woods Lane, Dobcross; 53.55593°N 2.01420°W	—	c. 1800	A stone house on a projecting plinth with a band quoins, an eaves cornice, and a stone-slate roof. There are two storeys and three bays. The central bay is pedimented and contains a doorway with a fanlight, above which is a Venetian window. The other windows are sashes.	II
The Old Bell, Delph; 53.56431°N 2.01937°W		c. 1800	Originally a posting and coaching house, later a restaurant, it is in stone with quoins and a slate roof. There are three storeys and a symmetrical front of three bays. The central doorway has 3/4 columns, a fanlight, and an open pediment. The windows are sashes, and at the rear are mullioned windows and taking-in doors.	II
Higher Kinders, Greenfield; 53.53860°N 2.00128°W		Mid-18th to early 19th century	A group of stone cottages with stone-slate roofs in a T-shaped plan, incorporating loom workshops and a barn. The west range has four storeys and three bays, and the east range has three storeys and four bays. The windows are mullioned, and in the east range are segmental-headed cart entrances with keystones, and an owl hole. In the angle between the ranges is a flight of stone steps.	II*
6, 7 and 8 Dale Lane, Delph; 53.57024°N 2.01790°W	—	Late 18th to early 19th century	A row of three stone houses with a stone-slate roof. They have two storeys and a total of seven bays, and behind bays 1 to 3 is a parallel range. The windows are mullioned, there is a 20th-century porch in bay 6, and small 20th-century extensions at the rear.	II
8 King Street, Delph; 53.56731°N 2.02331°W	—	Late 18th to early 19th century	A stone house with a stone-slate roof, there are two storeys and a former workshop basement, and two bays. Steps with cast iron railings lead up to a central doorway with a fanlight, which is flanked by bow windows under a continuous hood mould. On the top floor is a five-light mullioned window and a sash window, and there are also a doorway and mullioned windows in the basement.	II
21 Ripponden Road, Denshaw; 53.59387°N 2.03874°W	—	Late 18th to early 19th century	A stone house with quoins and a stone-slate roof. It has a single-depth plan, two storeys and three bays. On the front is a 20th-century porch and mullioned windows, including a seven-light window on the upper floor, and in the gable ends and at the rear are 20th-century windows.	II
199 and 203 Chew Valley Road, Greenfield; 53.53380°N 2.00209°W	—	Late 18th to early 19th century	A pair of stone houses with a stone-slate roof, a double-depth plan, and three storeys. The doorway to No. 199 is in the gable end, and that to No. 203 is on the front. The windows are mullioned, including eleven-light windows on the two upper floors of No. 199. There is a small lean-to extension at the rear.	II
Fern Lee Farmhouse and cottages, Greenfield; 53.52792°N 1.99923°W		Late 18th to early 19th century	A stone house with a stone-slate roof, a double-depth plan, three storeys and three bays. To the left is a recessed entrance with a 20th-century porch, and to the right is a three-storey bay, and a two-storey cottage with a square-headed doorway. All the windows are mullioned.	II
Ivy Cottage, Diggle; 53.56882°N 1.98933°W	—	Late 18th to early 19th century	A house that was extended to the right in the 20th century, it is in stone with a stone-slate roof. The original part has three storeys and one bay. The windows are mullioned, and in the left gable end is a door on the middle floor, and a two-light window above.	II
1–13 New Street, Uppermill; 53.54872°N 2.00475°W		1808	A row of seven houses, one later a shop, in stone mainly with stone-slate roofs, and some with tiled roofs. They have a double-depth plan, three storeys, and two bays each, apart from No. 1, which has one bay. Most of the windows are sashes, some have been replaced by casements, and in No. 3 is a shop window. The doorways have square heads. At the rear are mullioned windows, a blocked taking-in door, and a lean-to extension.	II
93 and 95 Stockport Road, Lydgate; 53.53457°N 2.04054°W	—	c. 1810	A stone house with a dentilled eaves cornice and a stone-slate roof with coped gables. It has a double-depth plan, three storeys, three bays, and a two-storey wing at the rear. On the front is a central doorway with a dentilled pediment, and there is a doorway with a square head in the left return. The windows are mullioned.	II
Bridge No. 66, Diggle; 53.56456°N 1.99721°W	—	1811	The bridge carries Ward Lane over the Huddersfield Narrow Canal. It is in stone, and consists of a single elliptical arch. The bridge has a keystone, and parapets with round coping piers.	II
Bridge No. 69, Diggle; 53.56031°N 1.99892°W		1811	An accommodation bridge over the Huddersfield Narrow Canal. It is in stone, and consists of a single elliptical arch. The bridge has parapets with round coping and square terminal piers.	II
Tameside, Dobcross; 53.55392°N 2.01930°W	—	1816	A stone house, partly rendered, on a projecting plinth, with shaped eaves gutter brackets, and a stone-slate roof hipped to the right. It has a single-depth plan, two storeys and three bays, and a small lean-to extension at the rear. In the centre is a doorway with a semicircular head, impost blocks, a dated keystone, and a fanlight. The windows are sashes with wedge lintels, and at the rear is an arched stair window.	II
6 Delph New Road, Dobcross; 53.55404°N 2.01917°W	—	c. 1816	A stone house on a projecting plinth, with shaped eaves gutter brackets, and a hipped stone-slate roof with ball finials. There are two storeys and three bays, and a similar later parallel range at the rear. In the centre is a doorway with an archivolt, impost capitals, a keystone, and a fanlight. The windows are sashes with wedge lintels, and at the rear are two arched windows with keystones.	II
Denshaw Oddfellows Lodge; 53.59183°N 2.03948°W		1818	Originally a house, later a club, it is in stone with shaped eaves gutter brackets and a stone-slate roof. There are two storeys, three bays, and lean-to extensions on both sides. The central doorway has a rusticated surround, a lintel with a keystone, and a moulded hood. The windows are sashes, and there is a blocked taking-in door in the gable end.	II
17 Chew Valley Road, Greenfield; 53.53781°N 2.01086°W		c. 1820	Originally a toll house, later a private house, it is in stone with a pyramidal slate roof and an extension in rendered brick. It has one storey, two bays, and a rear extension. On the front are two doorways with pointed arches, one blocked, and the other with a fanlight, and between them is a casement window with a stone lintel. On the sides are casement windows with pointed arches.	II
Bell House, Delph; 53.56429°N 2.01960°W	—	c. 1820	Originally a hotel and altered later, the house is in stone with quoins, an eaves cornice, and a stone-slate roof. The original part is symmetrical with three storeys and three bays, there is a three-storey, one-bay extension to the right containing a carriage arch, and a one-storey one-bay extension to the left. In the latter is a doorway with a fanlight, an archivolt and a pediment. There is a former doorway with similar features in the middle bay of the main block converted into a window. The other windows are sashes. At the rear are taking-in doors.	II
The Limes and Heathfields House, Uppermill; 53.54883°N 1.99981°W		c. 1820	Originally one house, later divided into two, it is in stone on a projecting plinth, with rusticated quoins, an eaves cornice, and a stone-slate roof. The house has a double-depth plan, three storeys, three bays, and extensions to the left. The central doorway is approached by steps, and has 3/4 columns, a fanlight, and an open pediment, and the windows are sashes. At the rear are mullioned windows, a blocked taking-in door, and a stair window with impost blocks and a keystone.	II
Kirklea, Uppermill; 53.54922°N 1.99249°W		c. 1820	Originally a vicarage, later a private house, it is in stone on a projecting plinth, with quoins, an eaves cornice, and a stone-slate roof. It has a double-depth plan, two storeys, three bays, and a later gabled extension to the right. The central porch has a coped gable with a ball finial, and a doorway with a moulded surround. The windows are casements with pointed heads, and at the rear is a tall stair window.	II
5 Spurn Lane and barn, Diggle; 53.56490°N 2.00077°W	—	After 1822	The house and barn are in stone, the house has a slate roof, and the barn has a roof of stone-slate. The house has two and three storeys and two bays, a square-headed doorway and mullioned windows. The barn has a semicircular-headed cart entrance, a winnowing door, a blocked shippon door and 20th-century windows.	II
Hearse House, Uppermill; 53.55406°N 1.99029°W		1824	The hearse house is outside St Chad's Church. It is in stone and has a stone-slate roof with coped gables and a finial. There are two bays, each with a pointed arched entry, and on the sides and rear are windows with pointed heads.	II
15 New Street, Uppermill; 53.54876°N 2.00443°W		1820s	A stone house with a 20th-century tiled roof, it has a double-depth plan, three storeys and three bays. On the front are two doorways; the left doorway has a keystone lintel, and the right-hand door has flanking pilasters, a segmental fanlight with radial glazing bars, and an archivolt with a keystone. The latter door is flanked by bow windows, above which is a moulded cornice. On the upper floors are sash windows, and at the rear are mullioned windows and blocked taking-in doors.	II
Pack Horse Slack Farmhouse, Diggle; 53.57552°N 2.00618°W	—	1820s	A stone farmhouse, later a private house, that has a stone-slate roof with coped gables. There are three storeys and three bays, and a porch wing on the right gable. In the centre is a round-headed cart entrance converted into a window, above which is a 20th-century window. The other windows are mullioned, and there is a blocked taking-in door in the right gable.	II
10, 12 and 14 Clough Lane and 1, 3, 3A and 5 Beech Lane, Grasscroft; 53.53781°N 2.03326°W	—	1820s (probable)	Originally a warehouse, later divided into six houses and a flat, it is in stone with a roof partly of slate and partly of stone-slate. There are two blocks, the north block has four storeys and four bays, and the south block has three storeys and three bays. The windows are mullioned, there are blocked doors and taking-in doors, and entry to the rear is by stepped bridges.	II
Spring Field, Dobcross; 53.55958°N 2.03205°W	—	1820s or 1830s	A stone house with a stone-slate roof, a double-depth plan, three storeys, one bay, and a 20th-century garage extension to the right. On the ground floor is a doorway to the right, and a three-light window. On the upper floors are five-light windows; all the windows are mullions.	II
1, 2 and 3 Starting Chair, Austerlands; 53.54982°N 2.04262°W	—	Early 19th century	A row of three houses and a former farm building at the left. They are in stone and have a stone-slate roof with coped gables, shaped eaves gutter brackets, a double-depth plan, and two storeys. The doorway to No. 1 has a square head, and the other two doorways have rusticated surrounds and keystone lintels. The windows are mullioned.	II
2 Church Fields and 16 and 18 The Square, Dobcross; 53.55603°N 2.01316°W	—	Early 19th century	A stone building with a stone-slate roof, three storeys and two bays, each floor being occupied by a cottage. The windows are mullioned, and the top cottage is approached by external stairs.	II
2–10 Doctor Lane and 1257 Oldham Road, Austerlands; 53.54948°N 2.04210°W	—	Early 19th century	A row of six cottages in stone with a stone-slate roof. Each cottage has shaped eaves gutter brackets, two storeys and one bay, and the right bay projects forward. The cottages each has a doorway with a square head and mullioned windows. The left gable end is rendered, and against it is a small 20th-century extension.	II
4 Saint Mary's Gate, Uppermill; 53.54858°N 2.00592°W		Early 19th century	A stone house with quoins, shaped eaves gutter brackets, and a stone-slate roof. There are three storeys, and a symmetrical front of three bays. On the front is a central doorway and sash windows, and at the rear are steps leading up to a doorway on the top floor, and a three-light mullioned window.	II
5 The Shaws, Uppermill; 53.54569°N 1.99966°W		Early 19th century	A stone house with a stone-slate roof, a double-depth plan, two storeys, one bay, and an extension to the rear. The doorway has a chamfered surround, and the windows are mullioned.	II
7, 9, 11 and 13 Strawberry Lane, Lydgate; 53.52958°N 2.03935°W	—	Early 19th century	A row of four stone houses with shaped eaves gutter brackets and a slate roof. They have three storeys and a double-depth plan, and each house has a single-storey wing at the rear. The doorways have square heads, and the windows are mullioned.	II
8 Church Fields and garages, Dobcross; 53.55575°N 2.01337°W	—	Early 19th century	Originally a cottage with stables and a carriage house, in stone with a stone-slate roof. The cottage has a single-depth plan, two storeys, two bays, and a lean-to extension at the left. It is gabled, and has mullioned windows. The outbuildings are later and have a chamfered doorway, a carriage entry with a segmental arch and a keystone, and gables. All the gables have finials.	II
8 Tame Lame, Delph; 53.57924°N 2.04065°W	—	Early 19th century	A stone house with a sill band and a stone-slate roof with coped gables. It has a double-depth plan, two storeys, and three bays. The windows are mullioned, and contain sashes.	II
13 Diglee, Diggle; 53.56898°N 1.98820°W	—	Early 19th century	The house was extended later in the 19th century, and is in stone on a projecting plinth, with a stone-slate roof. It has a single-depth plan, two storeys and two bays, with a two-bay extension to the right. The windows are mullioned.	II
14 and 16 Oldham Road, Delph; 53.56306°N 2.02387°W	—	Early 19th century	A stone house on a projecting plinth, with quoins, sill bands, shaped eaves gutter brackets, and a stone-slate roof. There are three storeys and a symmetrical front of three bays. The central doorway has a moulded surround and a hood. The windows on the front are sashes, and at the rear are mullioned windows, a stair window, and a taking-in door. To the left is a lean-to garage.	II
17 Harrop Green, Diggle; 53.57027°N 1.99264°W	—	Early 19th century	A stone house with a 20th-century tiled roof. It has a double-range plan and two storeys. There are two square-headed doorways, one blocked, and the windows are mullioned.	II
24, 26 and 28 Stoneswood Road, Delph; 53.56532°N 2.02252°W	—	Early 19th century	A row of three stone houses with quoins, shaped eaves gutter brackets, and a stone-slate roof. They have a single-depth plan, three storeys, and each house has one bay. The windows are mullioned.	II
32 Sandy Lane and 1 Long Lane, Dobcross; 53.55730°N 2.01118°W	—	Early 19th century	A pair of stone houses with quoins and a stone-slate roof. There are two and three storeys, two bays, and lean-to extensions at the left and the rear. The windows are mullioned, and there are two 20th-century porches.	II
33 and 35 Wool Road, Dobcross; 53.55758°N 2.00615°W	—	Early 19th century	A stone house, later divided into two dwellings, with a stone-slate roof, three storeys, two bays, and a 20th-century lean-to extension to the right. In the left bay is a square-headed doorway, and the windows are mullioned, with three lights on the lower floors, and five lights on the top floor.	II
34–40 Oldham Road, Denshaw; 53.58914°N 2.04330°W	—	Early 19th century	A terrace of four stone cottages with a stone-slate roof. They have two storeys, a double-depth plan, No. 34 has two bays, and the other cottages have one bay each. The doors have square heads, the windows are mullioned, and there is a blocked taking-in door at the rear.	II
Ashfield House, Springhead; 53.54049°N 2.06052°W	—	Early 19th century	A stone house on a projecting plinth, with quoins, a band, an eaves cornice, and a stone-slate roof. It has a double-depth plan, two storeys, three bays, and small extensions to the left and at the rear. The central doorway has a rusticated surround, a fanlight and a keystone lintel. The windows are mullioned, and there is a blocked taking-in door in the right gable end.	II
Canal subway, Diggle; 53.56321°N 1.99781°W	—	Early 19th century	The subway carries a footpath under the Huddersfield Narrow Canal, it is in stone, and consists of a round-headed tunnel. The north portal has a semicircular head with voussoirs, and at the south end a wall with rusticated coping continues alongside the footpath.	II
Cherry Farmhouse, Denshaw; 53.59623°N 2.05385°W	—	Early 19th century	A stone farmhouse with a slate roof, two storeys, two bays, and 20th-century lean-to extensions and a porch. The windows are mullioned.	II
Cottage north of Holly Grove Cottage, Dobcross; 53.55718°N 1.99761°W	—	Early 19th century	A stone house with shaped eaves gutter brackets and a stone-slate roof with coped gables. It has three storeys, three bays, and a lean-to extension on the right. The windows are mullioned; on the ground floor they have five lights, and on the upper floors they have eight lights.	II
Former Cross Keys Inn; 53.55954°N 2.03110°W		Early 19th century	The former public house is in stone on a projecting plinth, with a slate roof, a double-depth plan, three storeys, two bays, and a 20th-century extension to the left. In the centre of the front is a 20th-century porch, and the windows are mullioned.	II
Delph Lodge; 53.56418°N 2.01886°W	—	Early 19th century	Two stone houses with quoins, an eaves cornice, and a hipped stone-slate roof. There are two storeys and fronts of five and four bays. Steps lead up to a doorway with 3/4 columns, a fanlight and an open pediment. The windows are sashes, and at the rear are an arched stair window and a canted bay window.	II
Green Ash House and barn, Delph; 53.58082°N 2.04194°W	—	Early 19th century	The house and the barn, at right angles to the rear, are in stone. The house has a stone-slate roof, three storeys and three bays. There is a central doorway and the windows are mullioned. At the rear is a link to the barn, which has a corrugated roof, a segmental-headed cart entry, a mullioned window, an outshut, and an inserted garage door.	II
Greenfield House, Greenfield; 53.53073°N 1.98480°W	—	Early 19th century	A stone house on a projecting plinth, with an eaves cornice and a stone-slate roof. It has a double-range plan, two storeys, and three bays. The central doorway has pilasters, a radial fanlight, and a dropped keystone. Some of the windows are mullioned, and others are sashes.	II
Halls Bridge and Lock 20W, Greenfield; 53.54119°N 2.01029°W		Early 19th century	A lock on the Huddersfield Narrow Canal and an accommodation bridge crossing it. The bridge is in stone and consists of a single semicircular arch. It has voussoirs, a band, a parapet with semi-round copings, and stone pilasters at the west end with capstones. The lock has a stone basin, a single wooden gate at the head, and double wooden gates at the tail.	II
Hey Bank House, Delph; 53.57001°N 2.04582°W	—	Early 19th century	A stone house with a stone-slate roof, a double-depth plan, two storeys, three bays, a one-bay single storey extension to the left, and a porch extension to the right. The central doorway has a square head, and the windows are mullioned.	II
Higher Cross House, Uppermill; 53.54569°N 1.99529°W	—	Early 19th century	The house is in millstone grit with quoins and a stone-slate roof. It has a double-depth plan, two storeys, two bays, and a single-storey extension. On the front are three-light windows with sashes, and at the rear the windows are mullioned.	II
Junction House, Denshaw; 53.59205°N 2.03975°W	—	Early 19th century	Originally one house that was extended, and later divided in to three houses. The building is in stone with quoins and a stone-slate roof. It has an L-shaped plan, two storeys, seven bays on the south front, and three bays on the west front. The windows are sashes. The doorway on the south front has an architrave, an enriched frieze and a cornice, the doorway in the right gable end has a rusticated surround and a keystone lintel, and the doorway on the west front has a pediment on console brackets.	II
Kinders Lodge, Greenfield; 53.53724°N 2.00361°W	—	Early 19th century	A stone house on a projecting plinth, with quoins, sill bands, an eaves cornice, and a stone-slate roof. It has three storeys and a symmetrical front of three bays flanked by two-storey wings on both sides. There is a central door, the windows are mullioned, and there is a tall stair window at the rear.	II
Lee Cross House, Diggle; 53.56430°N 1.99194°W	—	Early 19th century	A stone house with shaped eaves brackets, and a stone-slate roof with coped gables. There are two storeys, a symmetrical font of three bays, and lean-to extensions at the left and the rear. In the centre of the front is a 20th-century porch, and the windows are mullioned.	II
Manor House Farmhouse, Dobcross; 53.55335°N 2.03240°W	—	Early 19th century	A stone farmhouse with quoins, an eaves cornice, a blocking course, a stone-slate roof, two storeys and three bays, the central bay pedimented. The doorway has a fanlight and a lintel with a keystone, and the windows are replacement casements. In the left gable is a tall stair window.	II
Moorgate Bridge, Uppermill; 53.54745°N 2.00792°W		Early 19th century	A roving bridge, it carries Moorgate Street over the Huddersfield Narrow Canal. The bridge is in stone, and consists of a single semi-elliptical arch with voussoirs, a lightly protruding band at parapet level, and half-round copings.	II
New Barn, Greenfield; 53.52786°N 1.98401°W	—	Early 19th century	Six stone cottages with quoins and a stone-slate roof. They have three storeys, and two bays on the front and two bays on the sides. The entrance front is gabled, and contains three semicircular-headed doorways, one blocked, with fanlights and keystones, and an owl hole in the gable. At the rear steps lead up to a doorway on the middle floor. All the windows are mullioned.	II
Nook Farmhouse, Diggle; 53.58126°N 1.99395°W	—	Early 19th century	A stone farmhouse and cottage that has a stone-slate roof with coped gables. It has quoins, a double-depth plan, two storeys with a basement, and lean-to porches to the left and at the rear. In the centre is a doorway, and the windows are mullioned, including a ten-light workshop window on the upper floor. In the right gable end is a former taking-in window.	II
Post Office, Delph; 53.56772°N 2.02353°W		Early 19th century	Originally a house, later a shop, it is in stone with a slate roof. It has a double-depth plan, three storeys and two bays. There is a central doorway flanked by 19th-century shop windows with round-headed lights, pierced spandrels, and a cornice on foliated consoles. On the middle floor are two four-light mullioned windows, and on the top floor is a twelve-light mullioned workshop window.	II
Warth Cottages, Diggle; 53.56764°N 1.99689°W	—	Early 19th century	A stone house with quoins and a stone-slate roof. There are three storeys and two bays. On the front is a square-headed doorway, the windows are mullioned, and in the gable end is a blocked taking-in door.	II
Wibsey Cottages, Denshaw; 53.59290°N 2.03912°W	—	Early 19th century	A terrace of five stone cottages with a stone-slate roof. The cottages have a double-depth plan, two storeys, and each has a square-headed doorway to the left, and a four-light mullioned window on each floor.	II
Wool wall, Delph; 53.56679°N 2.03364°W	—	Early 19th century	The wall was used for drying yarn, wool and cloth, and consists of a drystone wall about 25 metres (82 ft) long. The north face is vertical, and the south face is angled and stepped, and on the edge are coping stones.	II
Wool wall, Dobcross; 53.55786°N 1.99694°W	—	Early 19th century	The wall was used for drying wool and cloth. It consists of a drystone wall about 50 metres (160 ft) long and 1.7 metres (5 ft 7 in) tall. On the top are unshaped coping stones laid on edge.	II
61, 61A, 63 and 63A Chew Valley Road, Greenfield; 53.53700°N 2.00887°W	—	c. 1830	A pair of stone houses, later converted into flats, with a stone-slate roof. Each house has three storeys and one bay, the doorways are in the gable ends, and there is a small brick lean-to extension at the rear. On each floor of each house is a five-light mullioned window.	II
Carr House, Diggle; 53.57458°N 1.99815°W	—	c. 1830	A stone house that has a stone-slate roof with coped gables. It has a double-depth plan, two storeys on the front and three at the rear. On the front is a doorway with a rusticated surround, a fanlight, and a lintel with a keystone. On the upper floor is a taking-in door with a similar surround. At the rear are two sash windows, and the other windows in the house are mullioned, and include a 17-light workshop window on the top floor at the rear.	II
St Chad's Church, Uppermill; 53.55429°N 1.99004°W		1831–1833	The tower was rebuilt in 1846–47 re-using fabric from 1746. The church is in stone with a slate roof, and consists of a nave on a plinth, with an eaves cornice and a parapet, and a west tower with flanking gallery stair bays. The tower has four stages, buttresses, clock faces, and decorative corner pinnacles. Inside there are galleries on three sides.	II*
Sundial, St Chad's Church, Uppermill; 53.55419°N 1.99024°W	—	1835 (probable)	The sundial is outside St Chad's Church. It is in stone, and consists of an octagonal shaft with concave and convex curves, and with a moulded base and head. The shaft stands on an octagonal plinth, and on the top is a copper dial and gnomon.	II
Stone tenter posts, Dobcross; 53.55585°N 2.03389°W	—	1840	A row of eleven stone tenter posts in a straight line at intervals between 2 metres (6 ft 7 in) and 5 metres (16 ft). They are about 2 metres (6 ft 7 in) tall, and have square projections on the southern sides.	II
Railway accommodation underbridge MVL3/26; 53.53745°N 2.01747°W	—	1845–1849	The bridge was built by the Huddersfield and Manchester Railway, later part of the London and North Western Railway, to carry the line over a footpath. It is in sandstone, and consists of skew segmental arches with stepped voussoirs, keystones, and impost bands. The abutments have quoins, and the wing walls are curved.	II
Railway overbridge MVL3/20, Wright's Mill; 53.52955°N 2.03369°W	—	1845–1849	The bridge was built by the Huddersfield and Manchester Railway, later part of the London and North Western Railway, to carry a track over the line. It is in buff sandstone, and consists of a single segmental arch. The bridge has voussoirs, keystones, impost bands, a string course, and a chamfered parapet. The abutments curve slightly outwards, and end in piers with pyramidal caps.	II
Railway overbridge MVL3/23; 53.53385°N 2.03003°W	—	1845–1849	The bridge was built by the Huddersfield and Manchester Railway, later part of the London and North Western Railway, to carry a track over the line. It is in buff sandstone, and consists of a single segmental arch. The bridge has voussoirs, keystones, impost bands, a string course, and a chamfered parapet. The abutments curve slightly outwards, and end in piers with pyramidal caps.	II
Railway tunnel portals MVL3/41, Standedge Tunnel; 53.56981°N 1.98977°W		1845–1849	There are three railway portals at the western end of the Standedge Tunnels. The central one was built for the Huddersfield and Manchester Railway, the south portal was built at the same time, and the north portal was built in 1890–94 for the London and North Western Railway. They are built in sandstone and brick, and are set into a gritstone wall. The central and south portals have Tudor arched heads with voussoirs, and buttresses. The north portal is in Staffordshire blue brick and is a horseshoe arch with a moulded surround.	II
Railway accommodation underbridge MVL3/29, Wickens; 53.54535°N 2.00961°W	—	Mid to late 1840s	The bridge was built by the Huddersfield and Manchester Railway, later part of the London and North Western Railway, to carry the line over a footpath. It is in sandstone, and consists of segmental arches with voussoirs, keystones, and impost bands. The splayed wing walls end in rectangular piers.	II
Railway overbridge MVL3/28, Oldham Road; 53.53923°N 2.01355°W		Mid- to late 1840s	The bridge was built by the Huddersfield and Manchester Railway, later part of the London and North Western Railway, to carry Oldham Road (the A670 road) over the line. It is in sandstone, and consists of skew segmental arches with stepped voussoirs, keystones, and abutments with quoins. The bridge, the piers, and the wing walls have parapets with moulded coping and a string course.	II
Railway underbridge MVL3/25, Oaklands Road; 53.53621°N 2.02257°W	—	Mid- to late 1840s	The bridge was built by the Huddersfield and Manchester Railway, later part of the London and North Western Railway, to carry the line over Oaklands Road. It is in cast and wrought iron and sandstone, and consists of a skew girder bridge. The abutments have semi-octagonal piers, and the angled wing walls end in octagonal piers.	II
Uppermill Viaduct; 53.55359°N 2.00762°W		1849	The viaduct was built for the Huddersfield and Manchester Railway, later the London and North Western Railway, over the valley of the River Tame. It is slightly curving, in stone, and has 23 semicircular-headed arches with rusticated voussoirs, three of the arches being skew with pilasters. The piers are rectangular on projecting plinths.	II
Highfield House, Springhead; 53.53921°N 2.05902°W	—	1850	A stone house on an ashlar plinth, with rusticated quoins, bands, an eaves cornice, and a hipped slate roof. It has a double-depth plan, two storeys, a front of three bays, a conservatory to the left, and a small extensio0n on the right. Steps lead up to a central doorway with a rusticated surround, a depressed arch, voussoirs, and a keystone. The windows are casements with architraves. Under the ground floor and the outer upper floor windows are aprons. The outer windows on the upper floor have triangular pediments on console brackets, and the central window has a segmental pediment and blind balustrading below. At the rear is a tall stair window.	II
Christ Church, Friezeland, Grasscroft; 53.53551°N 2.02396°W		c. 1850	The church, which was extended in the 1860s, is in stone and has a slate roof with coped gables and finials. It is in Gothic Revival style. The church consists of a nave with a clerestory, a north aisle, a south transept, a chancel with an organ chamber and vestry, and a northwest steeple. The steeple has a three-stage tower with diagonal buttresses and a broach spire. There is an external flight of steps on the transept, which has a five-light south window.	II
Christ Church Vicarage, Friezeland, Grasscroft; 53.53519°N 2.02465°W	—	c. 1850	The vicarage is in Gothic Revival style, and is built in stone with decorative roof tiles, coped gables, finials, and crest tiles. It is on a projecting plinth, and has quoins, angled buttresses, two storeys, and four bays. Three of the bays project and are gabled. On the front is a two-storey porch with an arched opening. Most of the windows are mullioned, and other features include an oriel window with a conical roof, and an arched gabled dormer window.	II
Stoneleigh, Springhead; 53.53904°N 2.05880°W	—	c. 1850	A stone house on an ashlar plinth, with rusticated quoins, bands, an eaves cornice, and a hipped slate roof. It has a double-depth plan, two storeys, a front of three bays, and a flat-roofed 20th-century extension at the rear. Steps lead up to a central doorway with a rusticated surround, a depressed arch, voussoirs, and a keystone, and is flanked by canted bay windows. The windows are sashes, on the upper floor they have architraves. The outer windows have triangular pediments on console brackets, and aprons, and the central window has a segmental pediment and blind balustrading below.	II
Wharmton Tower, Greenfield; 53.53868°N 2.01637°W	—	c. 1861	A country house in Gothic Revival style. It is in ashlar stone on a projecting plinth, and has a slate roof with coped gables. The house is in two and three storeys and has a front of eight bays, with a conservatory to the right. On the front, some bays are gabled and others are embattled. Some windows are mullioned, some are mullioned and transomed, there are canted and square bay windows, and an oriel window. Other features include a doorway with a pointed arch and gargoyles.	II
Christ Church, Denshaw; 53.59171°N 2.03791°W		1863	The church is in stone and has a slate roof with coped gables. It consists of a nave with a clerestory, north and south aisles, a chancel with an organ chamber and a chapel, and a west tower. The tower has three stages, a clock face, an embattled parapet with stepped merlons, pierced trefoils, and corner pinnacles.	II
St Mary's Church, Greenfield; 53.53306°N 1.99793°W		1875	The church is in stone and has a slate roof with coped gables and cross finials. It consists of a nave, a chancel flanked by an organ chamber and a vestry, and a northwest steeple. The steeple has a three-stage tower, angle buttresses, clock faces, and a broach spire. In the easternmost bay on the south side is a rose window.	II
Boundary stone, Greenfield; 53.55316°N 1.92565°W	—	Late 19th century	The boundary stone marks the boundary between Saddleworth and Austonley. It consists of a stone post with a rounded top, and is inscribed with the names of the places and with "BOUNDARY".	II
Rick shelter, Delph; 53.57600°N 2.04472°W	—	Late 19th century	A shelter for winter fodder, it is in cast iron with a cylindrical column at each corner. On top of each column is a pulley and a ball finial, and the columns are connected by timber and wrought iron members.	II
Model Farmhouse and farm buildings, Delph; 53.57925°N 2.03968°W	—	1880s	The farmhouse and farm buildings are in stone with slate roofs. The house has a projecting plinth, two storeys, three bays, and there is a barn at the rear under a single roof. There is a central doorway with a fanlight and a canopy, and the windows are mullioned and transomed. The barn has a cart entry and pitching holes. At the rear are farm buildings forming a courtyard.	II
Office building, W. H. Shaw Ltd., Diggle; 53.56136°N 2.00008°W	—	1890	The office building for the firm that built the Dobcross loom is in Gothic style, and built in ashlar stone on a plinth, with a roof of Westmorland slate. It has two storeys with attics, and a front of five bays. The second and fourth bays project forward, the fourth bay is a clock tower, and the other bays have coped gables and finials. The windows are mullioned. The clock tower has four stages; in the bottom stage is a doorway with pilasters, a fanlight with a keystone and a cornice. The top stage is machicolated with clock faces, gables, corner pinnacles, and a Lombardic roof with an iron crown.	II
St Chad's War Memorial, Uppermill; 53.54784°N 2.00669°W		1921	The war memorial is in the grounds of St Chad's House. It is in sandstone, and consists of a statue of a winged angel on a circular shaft. The shaft has a moulded astragal and a chamfered base, and at the top is a moulded cornice. The angel stands on an octagonal base, with the right arm raised and the left hand holding a flower. The shaft is on a square pedestal with a moulded cornice and plinth, on a base of two steps. The pedestal has an inscribed panel on each face.	II
Saddleworth War Memorial; 53.54275°N 1.98611°W		1923	The war memorial stands in a prominent position on a hillside. It is in ashlar stone, and consists of a large obelisk on a stylobate. On the obelisk are carved motifs, an inscription and the names of those lost in the First World War.	II
Telephone kiosk, Delph; 53.57774°N 2.02850°W	—	1935	The K6 type telephone kiosk near the former Royal Oak public house was designed by Giles Gilbert Scott. It is constructed in cast iron with a square plan and a dome, and has three unperforated crowns in the top panels.	II
Telephone kiosk, Dobcross; 53.55641°N 2.01316°W		1935	The K6 type telephone kiosk outside the Swan Inn was designed by Giles Gilbert Scott. It is constructed in cast iron with a square plan and a dome, and has three unperforated crowns in the top panels.	II
Telephone kiosk outside Delph Post Office; 53.56773°N 2.02360°W		1935	The K6 type telephone kiosk outside Delph Post Office was designed by Giles Gilbert Scott. It is constructed in cast iron with a square plan and a dome, and has three unperforated crowns in the top panels.	II
Pair of pillboxes 53.53910°N 1.97462°W	—	c. 1940–41	The pair of linked pillboxes are partially sunk into a hillside overlooking the A635 road. They are in orange brick with reinforced concrete roofs. Each pillbox is rectangular with an angled corner, and are linked by an L-shaped passageway. A rectangular roof entrance at the angle of the passageway gives access to both pillboxes.	II
Pillbox; 53.58168°N 1.99076°W	—	c. 1940–41	The pillbox stands by a track overlooking the A62 road. It is built in orange brick with a concrete floor and roof, and is clad in dry stone walling in millstone grit. The pillbox has a rectangular plan, and a doorway in the west wall, three embrasures in the south wall, and two in the other walls.	II
Brooks House, Dobcross; 53.55674°N 2.01274°W	—	Undated	A stone house with quoins, an eaves cornice and a stone-slate roof. It has a double-depth plan, three storeys and three bays. The central doorway has an architrave and a pediment, and the windows on the front are sashes. There is a taking-in door on the second floor, and at the rear are mullioned windows.	II
The Nook, Austerlands; 53.54244°N 2.05467°W	—	Undated	A stone house with a stone-slate roof, two storeys, one bay, and a rear wing with extensions. The doorway has a square head, and the windows are mullioned.	II

== See also ==
- Listed buildings in Saddleworth to 1800
