= Church of St Chad, Uppermill =

Listed church in Greater Manchester, England

Church of St Chad
- St Chad Saddleworth
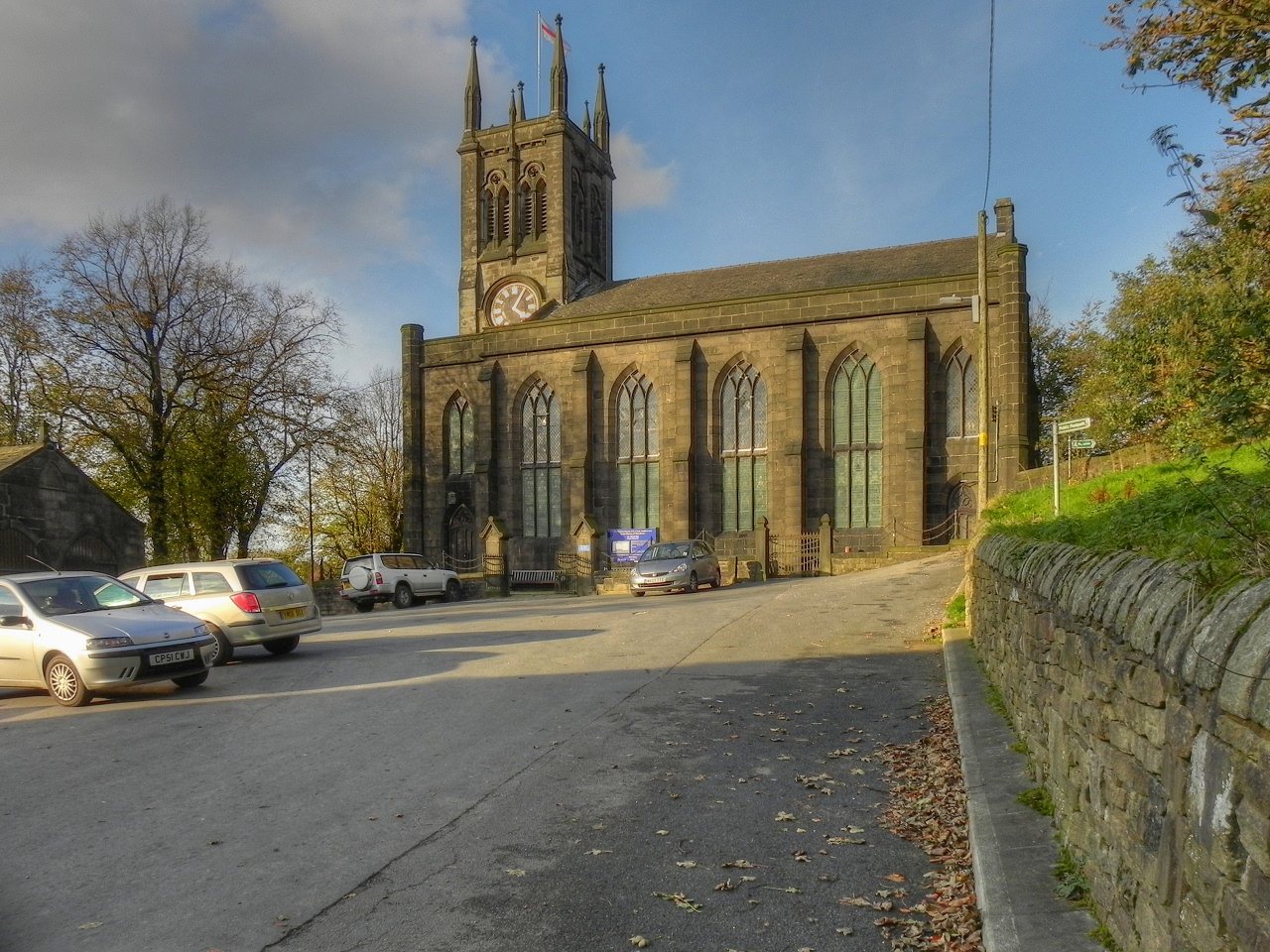
- The church in 2011

- Location in Greater Manchester
- 53.5543°N 1.9900°W
- OS grid reference: SE 00757 06405
- Address: Church Lane, Uppermill, Greater Manchester
- Country: England
- Denomination: Anglican
- Website: Church of St Chad

History
- Dedication: St Chad

Architecture
- Heritage designation: Grade II*
- Designated: 19 June 1967
- Architectural type: Church
- Style: Gothic Revival
- Years built: 1831–33; 1846–47 (tower rebuilt)

Specifications
- Materials: Ashlar, slate

The Church of St Chad is an Anglican parish church on Church Lane in Uppermill, a village in the civil parish of Saddleworth, within the Metropolitan Borough of Oldham, Greater Manchester, England. The church occupies an elevated site overlooking the village and is a Grade II* listed building. As of September 2026, it is included on Historic England's Heritage at Risk Register, rated in poor condition and with no agreed solution.

== History ==
A place of worship has stood on the site since 1215, when the first Saddleworth chapel was established as a chapel of ease within the parish of Rochdale and later came under the control of Whalley Abbey. Following the dissolution of the monasteries, the abbey was obliged to relinquish Quick Chapel, as it was then called, back to Rochdale's jurisdiction. Its patronage was subsequently transferred to the bishop of Manchester in 1866.

The current building was erected between 1831 and 1833 to replace an earlier structure on the same hilltop site. It was subsequently altered during the Victorian era, including the rebuilding of the tower in 1846–47, which incorporated masonry from a tower of 1746.

On 19 June 1967, the Church of St Chad was designated a Grade II* listed building.

In 2019 it was reported that the church's future was at risk due to extensive repair needs, with an architect identifying major defects to the roof and windows and the parish estimating costs of around £1 million. With no statutory funding and an unsuccessful Heritage Lottery Fund bid, the vicar warned that the building could face closure within a decade. A public consultation on its future was scheduled for March 2019.

A 2022 report in the Oldham Evening Chronicle stated that the Church of St Chad's continued to face significant financial and structural challenges, with major repairs required to the tower, roof and ceiling. An application to the Heritage Lottery Fund had been unsuccessful for a second time and that the parish was considering "hard choices" regarding the building's future. Efforts were ongoing to secure alternative funding with the intention to create more flexible community space within the church.

=== Heritage at Risk Register ===
Since at least 2022, the building has been included on Historic England's Heritage at Risk Register, with its condition rated as "poor" and with "no solution agreed". As of September 2026, this remains the case.

== Architecture ==
The church is constructed of ashlar masonry with a slate‑covered roof. The building has a gallery arrangement on three sides, incorporating a central tower to the west. The nave, divided into five bays, has a protruding plinth, an eaves band, and a parapet. A weathered buttress defines each bay, with pointed‑arch windows of three lights with mullions, a transom, and interlaced tracery (with the exception of the easternmost bay, which contains a two‑light window set above a priest's door). The east elevation features a five‑light window with mullions, a transom, and interlaced tracery, edged by octagonal corner shafts and weathered buttresses. The gable is completed with a raked parapet.

The west tower is arranged in four stages and is accompanied by stair bays providing access to the galleries. It has angled buttresses that change to clasping form at the upper stage, a two‑light window to the first stage, a pair of lancets to the second stage, clock faces to the third stage, two two‑light openings to the belfry, and ornate pinnacles on the corners.

=== Interior ===
Internally, octagonal columns of cast iron carry both the gallery and the cusped arches of the nave arcade. The ceiling is concave in form and includes painted decorative bosses, while the gallery parapet is finished with stencilled ornament. There are several 19th‑century wall plaques, together with an elaborate stone memorial of 1715 commemorating John Whitehead. The Commandment boards, choir stalls, font cover, lectern, pulpit and reredos—although dating from different periods—were all produced by G. Shaw of Uppermill, who was also responsible for the majority of the stained‑glass windows; the only exceptions are three windows on the north side, the most recent of which was made by Jean-Baptiste Capronnier in 1871. The Great East Window features a representation of The Last Supper. A 12‑light brass candelabrum of 1717 is also present. The building, an early example of the Gothic Revival style, retains a well‑preserved 19th‑century interior distinguished by its galleries, fittings and stained glass.

== Churchyard and associated structures ==
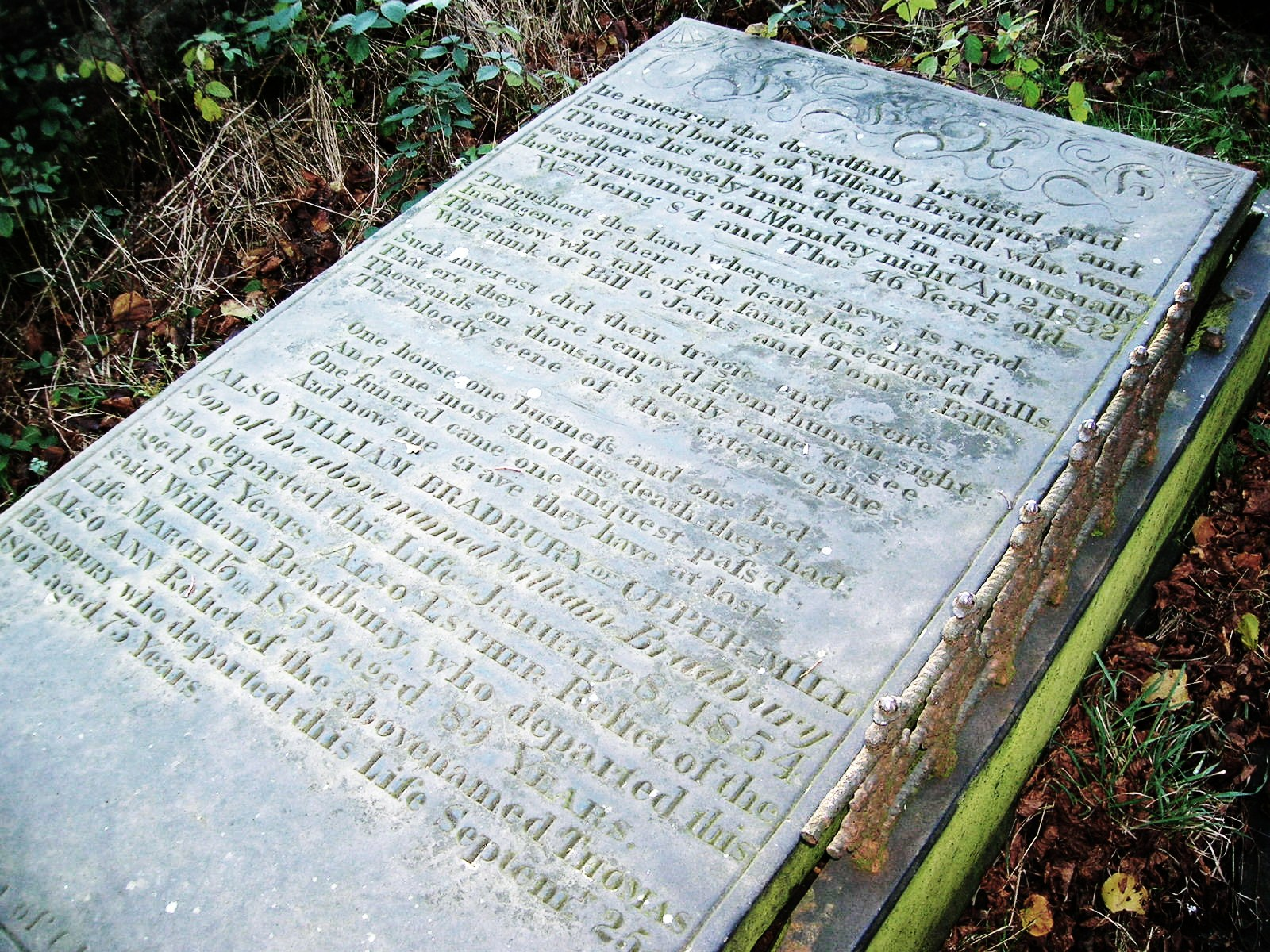
Bradbury family gravestone

The surrounding churchyard contains a wide range of historic monuments, including 18th and 19th‑century gravestones, family plots, and memorials linked to the area's textile and agricultural heritage. Many of the burials relate to long‑established Saddleworth families, alongside later interments associated with the industrial growth of the Pennine villages. The elevated site also offers extensive views across the Chew Valley and the surrounding moorland.

Two Grade II-listed structures stand outside the church: the former hearse house, built in 1824, and a sundial dating from around 1835. The hearse house, listed in 1967 and now used as church rooms, survives as an example of a small vernacular outbuilding associated with funerary practice, built in local stone and positioned just south of the church. The sundial stands to the southwest of the church on a stepped stone base, with its dial and gnomon made of copper.

== See also ==
- Grade II* listed buildings in Greater Manchester
- Listed buildings in Saddleworth from 1800
