= Padgett's Creek Baptist Church =

Historic church in South Carolina, United States

- U.S. National Register of Historic Places
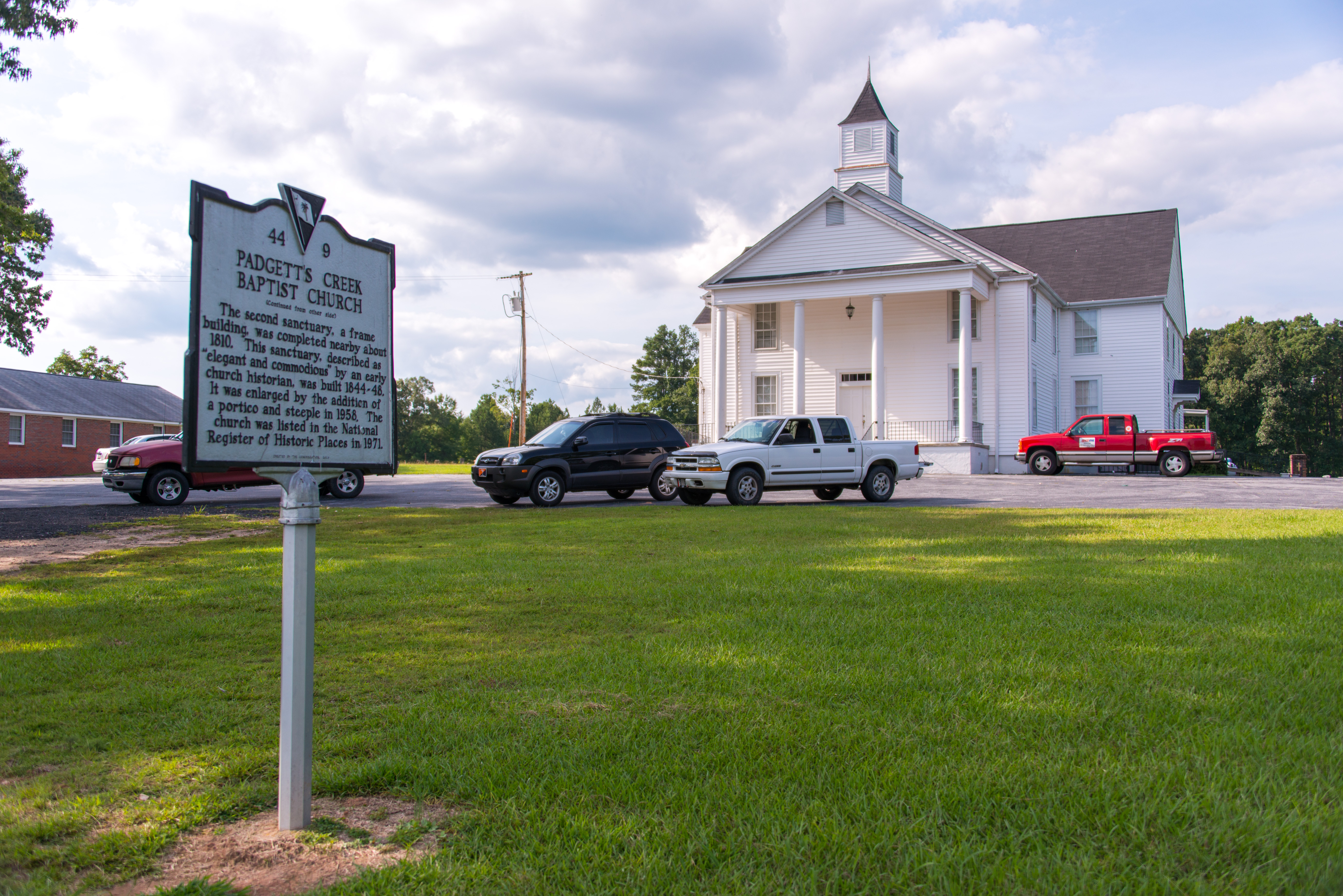

- Location within South Carolina Location within the United States
- Location: 843 Old Buncombe Rd, Union, South Carolina near Cross Keys, SC
- Coordinates: 34°37′30.162″N 81°44′42.18″W
- Area: 14 acres (5.7 ha)
- Built: 1844
- NRHP reference No.: 71000810
- Added to NRHP: May 06, 1971

Padgett's Creek Baptist Church is a historic Southern Baptist church located at 843 Old Buncombe Rd, Union, South Carolina near Cross Keys, Union County, South Carolina. It was built between 1844 and 1848, and is a plain, rectangular two-story meeting house building over slightly raised brick supports. The front has a portico added in 1958. There is also a one-story rear addition.

It was added to the National Register of Historic Places in 1971.
