= The Cross Keys, Chelsea =

Pub in Chelsea, London, England

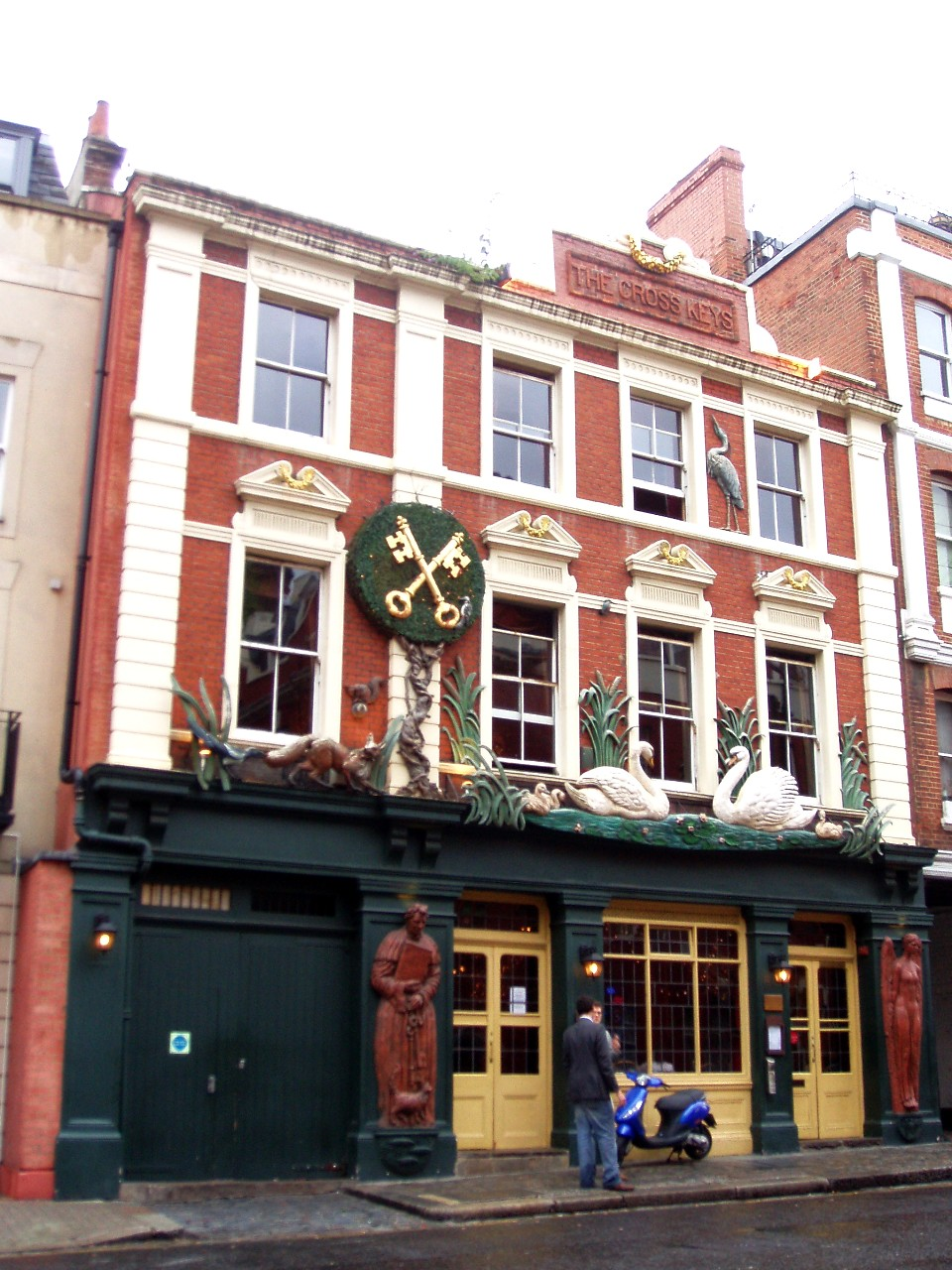

- Location within Royal Borough of Kensington and Chelsea Location within Greater London

General information
- Location: 1 Lawrence Street, Chelsea, London, England
- Coordinates: 51.483746°N 0.170951°W
- Construction started: 1708

The Cross Keys is a public house at 1 Lawrence Street, Chelsea, London SW3 5NB.

Built in 1708, it is the oldest pub in Chelsea. Regular visitors have included the artists Turner, Whistler and Sargent, writers Agatha Christie and Dylan Thomas, and musicians Bob Marley and the Rolling Stones.

In 2012, the property developer Andrew Bourne, the owner of the Cross Keys, closed its doors and boarded up the windows, having claimed that the pub loses money, and applied for planning permission to turn it into a mansion with a swimming pool in the basement. If he had been successful, the property could have been worth more than £10 million. In 2013, following a successful campaign by local people, it was sold on behalf of a private owner to Parsons Green Land for £3.9m, and later reopened as a pub.
