= Odd Down =

Suburb of Bath, England

Coordinates: 51.3614°N 2.3813°W

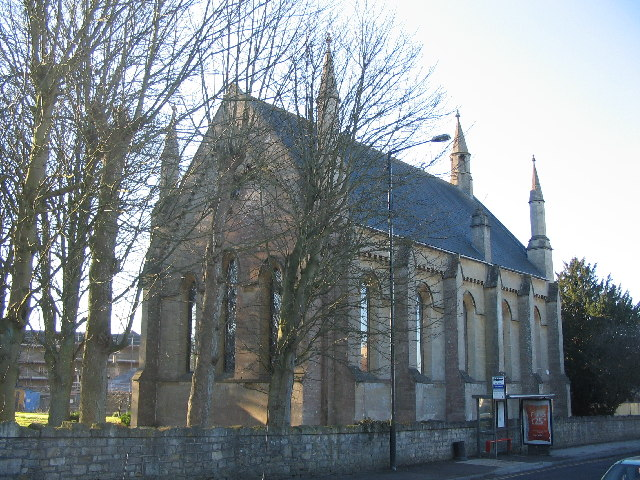
St. Martins church, Odd Down photographed in January 2006

Odd Down is an electoral ward in the City of Bath, England. A suburb of the city, Odd Down is located west and south of the city centre. The city ward population taken at the 2011 census was 5,681.

== History ==
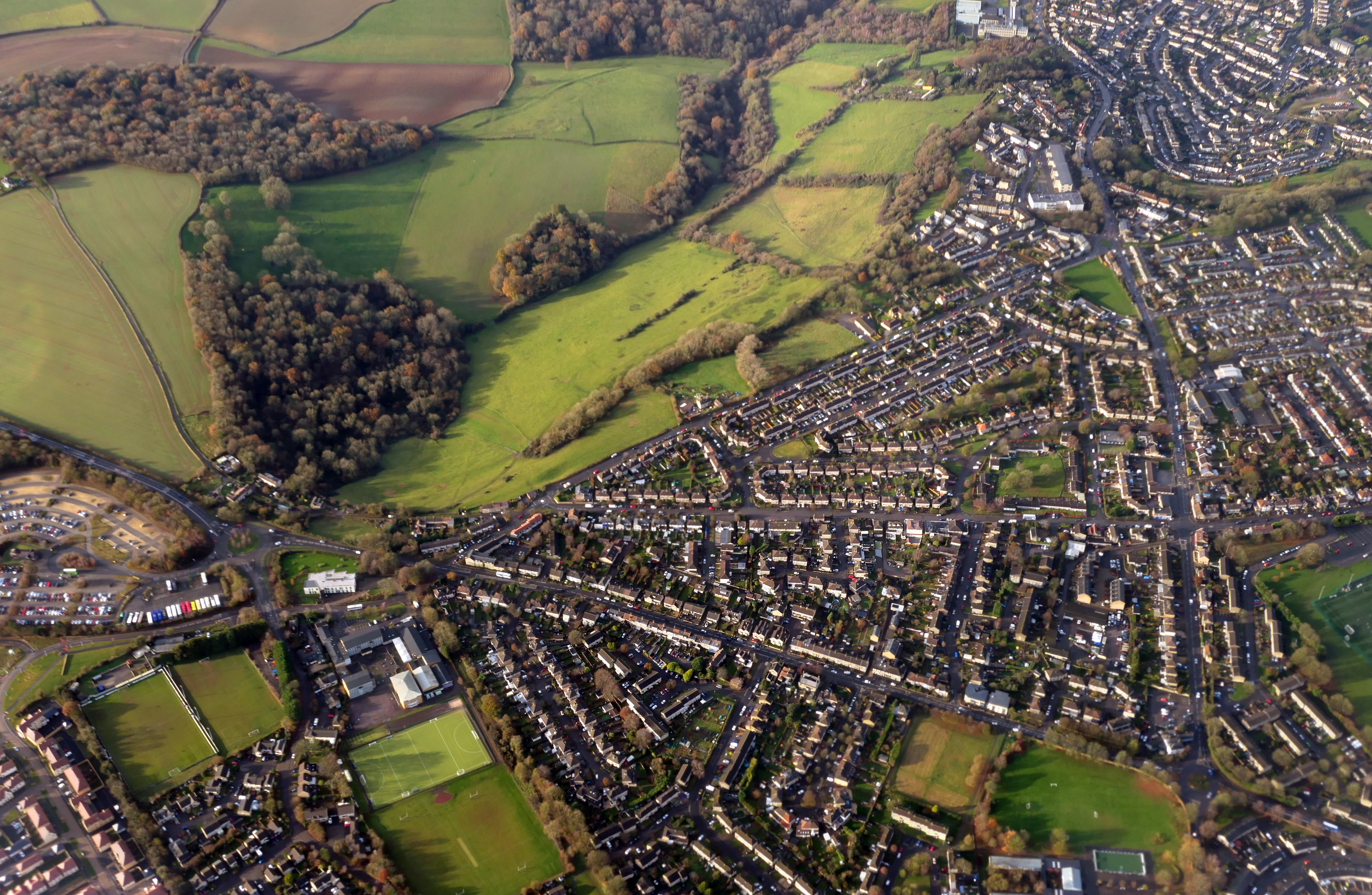
An aerial view

A 1,330 yards (1,220 m) section of the Wansdyke medieval earthwork in Odd Down, which has been designated as an Ancient monument, appears on the Heritage at Risk Register as being in unsatisfactory condition and vulnerable due to gardening.

The Cross Keys Inn is a Grade II listed building which was built in the late 17th or early 18th century. although an earlier pub on the site served as a coaching inn.

Thomas Stride operated a brewery and public house in Odd Down and represented Combe Hay in the Rural District Council.

== Sport ==
Odd Down A.F.C. is the local football club which won the 2015-16 Western Premier League.

Odd Down Playing fields has a 1.5km, purpose built, closed road cycling circuit.
