= Cross Keys Inn, Delph =

Listed former pub in Greater Manchester, England

Cross Keys Inn
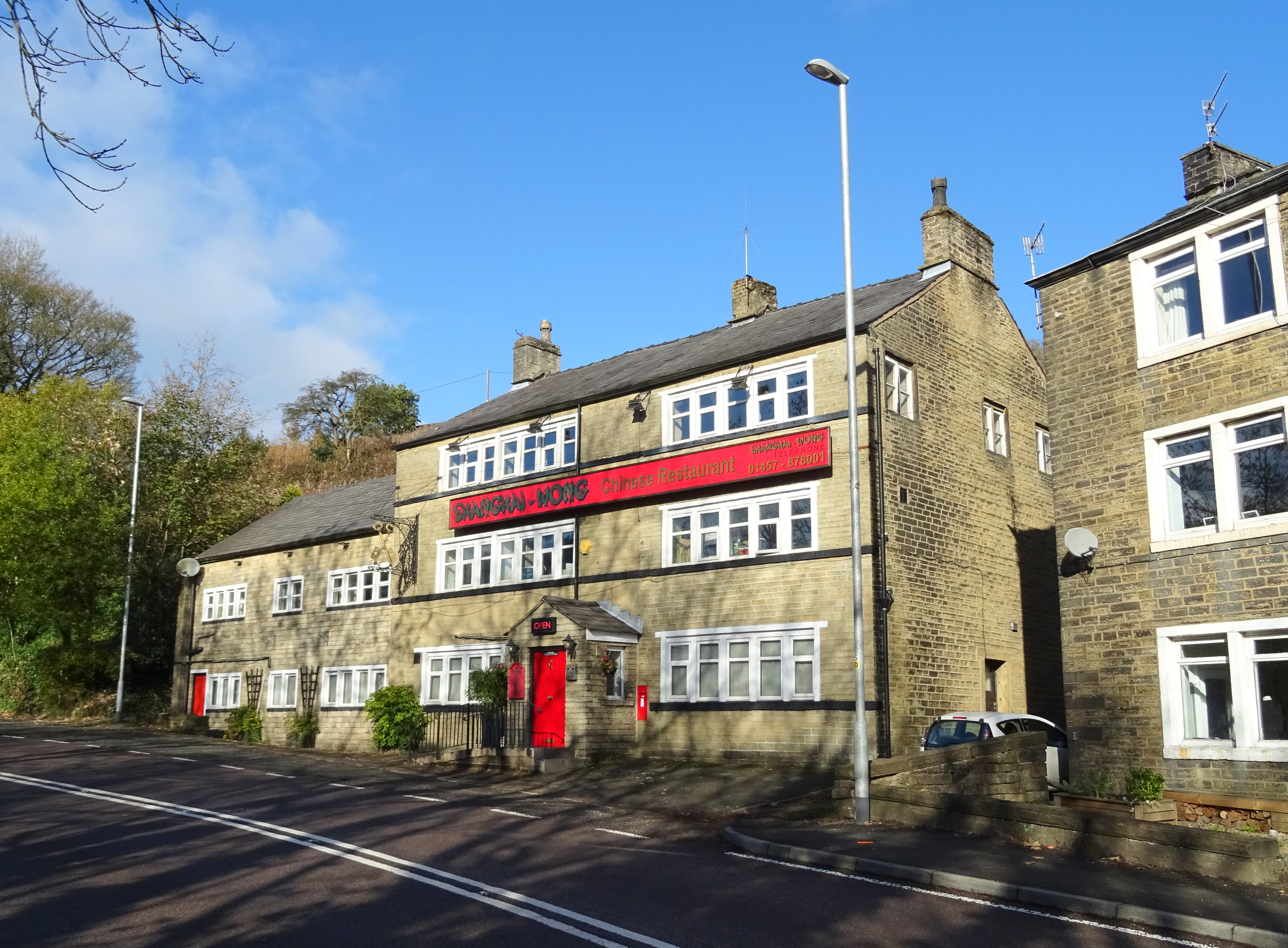
- The building as a restaurant in 2018

- Location within Greater Manchester
- Former names: Shanghai Wong

General information
- Status: Converted to residential use
- Type: Public house (former); Restaurant (former)
- Location: Oldham Road, Delph, Greater Manchester, England
- Coordinates: 53.5596°N 2.0311°W
- Year built: Early 19th century
- Renovated: 20th century (extended)

Design and construction
- Designations

Listed Building – Grade II
- Official name: Former Cross Keys Inn
- Designated: 3 July 1986
- Reference no.: 1318060

The Cross Keys Inn is a Grade II listed former public house on Oldham Road in Delph, a village in Saddleworth within the Metropolitan Borough of Oldham, Greater Manchester, England. Built in the early 19th century and thought to have served travellers on the Oldham–Austerlands turnpike, the building was later adapted for restaurant use from 2005 to 2020. In 2021 Oldham Council approved plans for its conversion to residential use.

== History ==
The building dates from the early 19th century, with a large extension added in the 20th century. The public house is thought to have been built around the time of, or shortly after, the opening of the Oldham–Austerlands turnpike, to take advantage of passing trade. The 1893 and 1934 Ordnance Survey maps mark the building as the Cross Keys public house.

On 3 July 1986, the former Cross Keys Inn was designated a Grade II listed building.

From 2005 until 2020, the premises were occupied by the Shanghai Wong restaurant, following the building's conversion from the former Cross Keys Inn. The date of the pub's closure and conversion is not recorded in publicly available sources. In 2021 it was reported that Oldham Council had approved a change‑of‑use application to convert the building into one three‑bed home and two four‑bed homes.

== Architecture ==
The building is constructed of dressed stone with a slate roof. It has a central entrance and three storeys, with a later porch and a 20th‑century extension on the left. The original doorway is now hidden by the porch. A raised stone base runs along the front. The two main sections, built at slightly different times, each contain large multi‑light windows on all floors, set within simple stone surrounds. There are three chimney stacks along the roof. The gable end has a two‑light window and a doorway with a plain stone frame. At the rear are further multi‑light windows and a blocked loading door, along with a small lean‑to addition.

== See also ==
- Listed buildings in Saddleworth from 1800
- Listed pubs in Greater Manchester
