= Cross Keys, Lexington =

Cross Keys
- Neighborhood of Lexington, Kentucky
- Interactive map of Cross Keys
- Coordinates: 38.039°N 84.558°W
- Country: United States
- State: Kentucky
- County: Fayette
- City: Lexington

Area
  - Total: 0.323 sq mi (0.84 km^{2})
  - Water: 0 sq mi (0.0 km^{2})

Population (2000)
  - Total: 681
  - Density: 2,110/sq mi (810/km^{2})
- Time zone: UTC-5 (Eastern (EST))
  - Summer (DST): UTC-4 (EDT)
- ZIP code: 40504
- Area code: 859

Cross Keys (alternatively called West Gardenside) is a neighborhood in southwestern Lexington, Kentucky, United States. Its boundaries are Traveler Road to the east, Versailles Road to the north, Parks Mill Road to the north, and Lane Allen Road to the south.

== Neighborhood statistics ==
- Area: 0.323 square miles (0.84 km^{2})
- Population: 681
- Population density: 2,110 people per square mile
- Median household income (2010): $72,229
