= Cross Keys, South Carolina =

Unincorporated community in South Carolina, US

Coordinates: 34°37′55″N 81°46′35″W

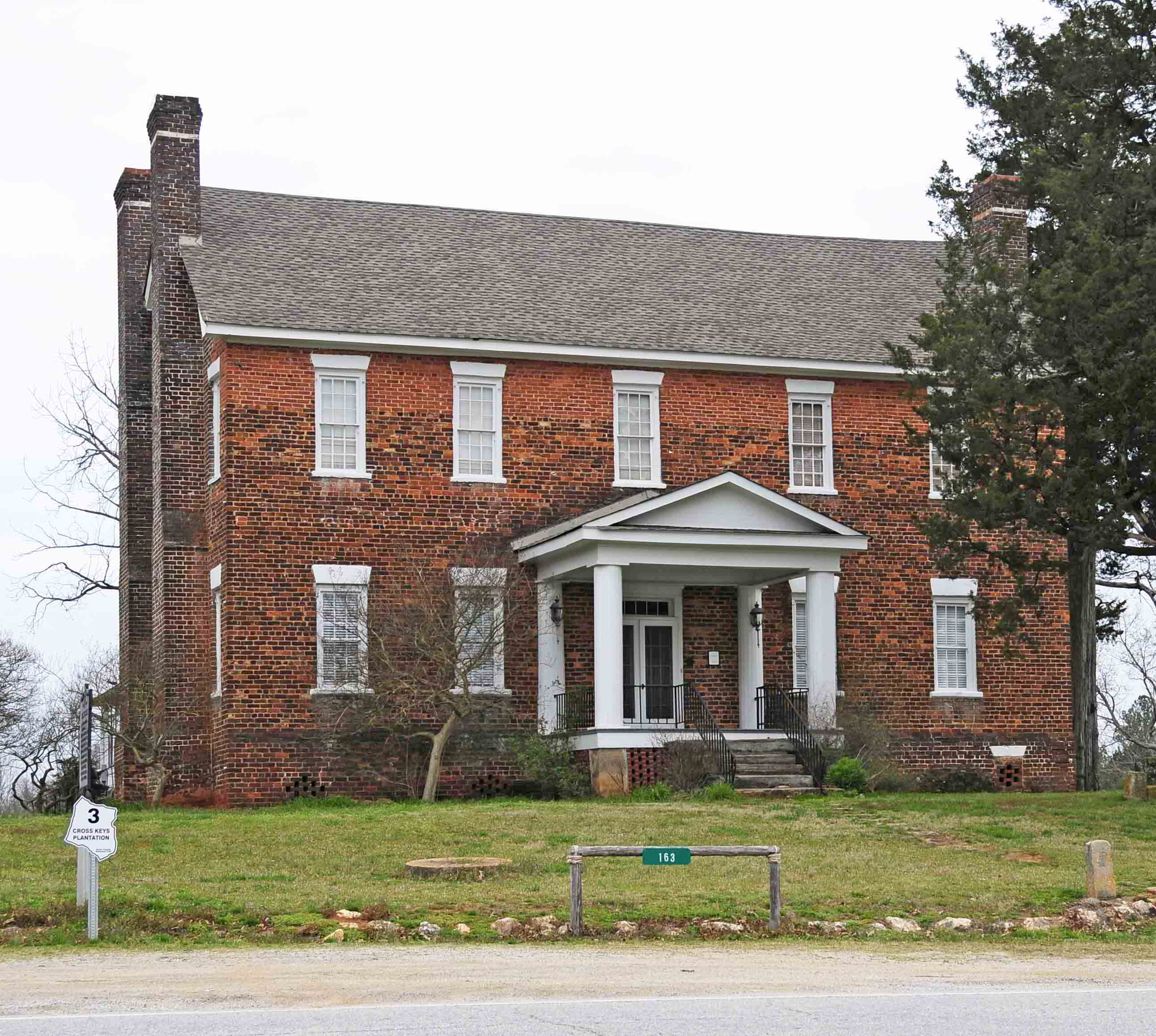
Cross Keys House

Cross Keys is an unincorporated community in Union County, South Carolina, United States. Historically, it was the site of the "large and prosperous" Cross Keys plantation. A post office was established at Cross Keys in 1809 and operated until 1909.

The Cross Keys House, a plantation home built in 1812–1814, stood at the intersection of two important early highways (the Old Charleston Road, now known as Old Buncombe Road, and Old Ninety-Six Road, also known as the Old Piedmont Stage Road) and was a stop for early travelers in the area. The site is listed on the National Register of Historic Places. Also listed is Padgett's Creek Baptist Church.

== Name ==
According to local history, Cross Keys was named following the travels of two British brothers from Charleston into the Upstate of South Carolina. One brother, who had been in charge of sailing their ship, came across an area of land in southern Spartanburg County which he decided to settle, thus creating the community of Cross Anchor. Meanwhile, the other brother, who held the ship's keys, ventured into Union County, settling the locale now known as Cross Keys.
