= Cross Keys, Dagenham =

Pub in Dagenham, London

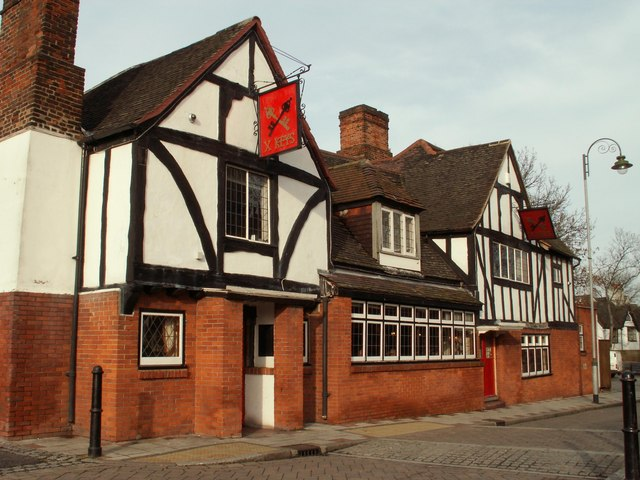
- Cross Keys Inn, Dagenham

- Location within Barking and Dagenham Location within Greater London

General information
- Location: Crown Street, London, England
- Coordinates: 51.539958°N 0.161609°E

Design and construction
- Designations

Listed Building – Grade II
- Official name: Cross Keys Inn Public House
- Designated: 28 June 1954
- Reference no.: 1064410

The Cross Keys is a pub in Crown Street, Dagenham, London.

The timber-framed building is Grade II listed and dates back to the 15th century.
