= Crosskeys Inn =

Mid-18th-century pub in Northern Ireland

Coordinates: 54.809°N 6.425°W

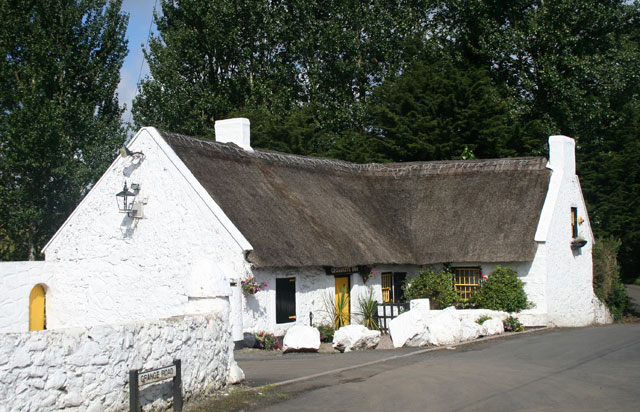
The pub in 2007

Crosskeys Inn is a pub situated in a rural location between Portglenone and Toome in County Antrim, Northern Ireland.

The pub, a Grade B1 listed building, is thought to have been built around 1740. In February 2000, the building was seriously damaged by fire. It was subsequently restored, and was named 'BBC Countryfile Magazine Country Pub of the Year' in 2017.
