= Crompton =

Crompton may refer to

== Place names ==
- Crompton (West Warwick), a community in West Warwick, Rhode Island, US
- Crompton, Greater Manchester, in Shaw and Crompton, Greater Manchester, England formerly in Lancashire
- Crompton Urban District, an obsolete local government district that covered Shaw and Crompton until 1974

== Institutions and companies ==
- Crompton Corporation, a chemical manufacturer headquartered in Connecticut
- Crompton House Church of England School, a secondary school in Shaw and Crompton
- Crompton Parkinson, British manufacturer of electrical motors, control gear and lamp bulbs
- Crompton Greaves Consumer Electricals, Indian manufacturer
- Crompton Greaves Power and Industrial Solutions, Indian corporation

== Technical and engineering terms ==
- British Rail Class 33 or Crompton, a class of diesel-electric locomotive

== People ==
- Crompton (surname), an English surname

== See also ==
- Compton (disambiguation)
