= List of mills in Shaw and Crompton =

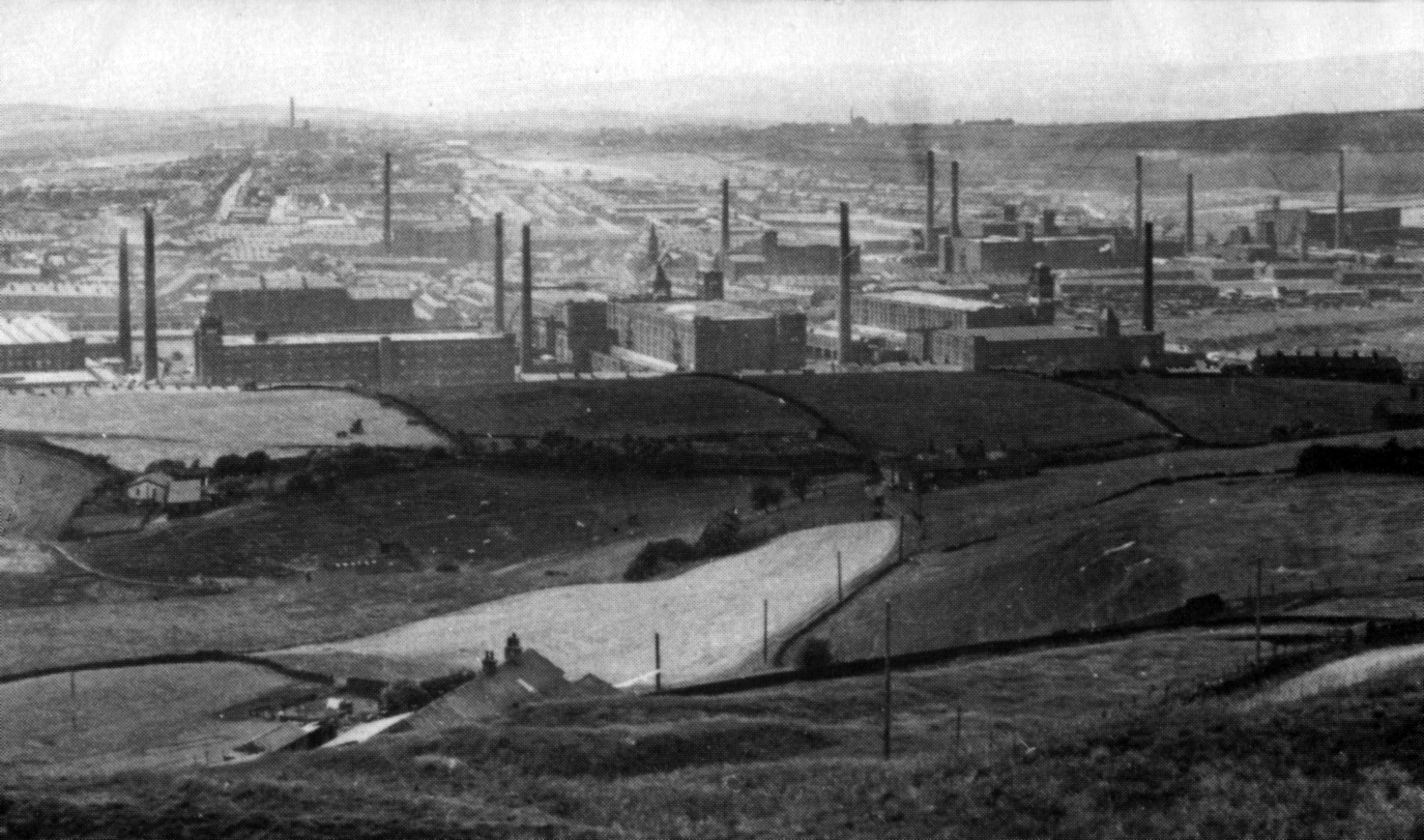
Following a building boom during the 1860s–1870s, Crompton became a major mill town, dominated by large rectangular brick-built cotton mills.

This is a list of textile factories that have existed in Shaw and Crompton, formerly of Lancashire and now in Greater Manchester, England.

From the Industrial Revolution until the 20th century, Crompton (as it was then mainly known) was a major centre of textile manufacture, particularly cotton spinning. During this period, it was dominated by large rectangular brick-built factories, some of which still remain today as warehouses or distribution centres. The town has seen forty-eight separate textile factories built within its boundaries.

== A–E ==
| Name | Architect | Location | Built | Demolished | Served (Years) |
|---|---|---|---|---|---|
| Ash | Wild & Collins | Jubilee Street 53°34′40″N 2°05′07″W | 1883 | 1985 | 102 |
| | Notes: Ash Spinning Co. Ltd's was incorporated on 25 January 1883 to build a cotton spinning mill holding about 80,000 mule spindles. 'Ash' mill was one of two mills in Shaw that was built twice. The original attempt blew down in a gale two months before it was completed. Regardless of this the mill was still finished by its deadline at cost of £20,000. The mill was extended twice in 1886 and 1920 respectively. It ceased production in 1984 and was demolished the following year. Ash's employees were transferred to Grape mill in neighbouring Royton. After lying empty for 12 years, the site is now occupied by approximately one seventh of Littlewoods' Shaw National Distribution Centre. | | | | |
| Beal | UNKNOWN | Beal Lane 53°34′38″N 2°05′28″W | <1832 | c.1875 | |
| | Notes: In its relatively short life this original Beal mill was operated by many different companies. William Taylor and Robinson & Co with the former still present in 1852 and later William Nutter and Co were documented to run the mill in 1861. Upon its demise in 1875, a company called Marsden and Berry were running the mill. Spindleage: 1915:96,276 Engine:J. Musgrave & Sons 1400hp Presently the site is occupied by Shaw Sheet Metal Co. Ltd. | | | | |
| Beal | Joseph Stott | George Street 53°34′57″N 2°05′09″W | 1889 | 1933 | 44 |
| | Notes: Built and operated by Beal Spinning Co. Ltd until its demolition. Some facts: 5 storeys, 30bays × 12; Spindleage: 1915; 97,928; Counts, 50–70 weft, 40–44 twists; It was built at a cost of £32,704 with a further cost of £41,349 for machinery and furnishings.; It burnt an average of 70 tons of coal each week at a price of 8s a ton.; It employed approximately 150 men and 75 women.; It consumed 130 'good American quality' bales of cotton each week.; There were 10,000 shareholders in the company at the cost of £10 a share.; The 19,070 sq. yard site was occupied for some time by a company called Buckton which constructed roads and buildings until it too was, somewhat ironically, demolished and the land redeveloped for a small housing estate which was completed in the 1990s. | | | | |
| Briar | Philip Sydney Stott | Beal Lane 53°34′34″N 2°05′20″W | 1906 | standing | 120 |
| | Notes: Built and operated by Briar Mill Ltd. Which became bankrupt and refloated as Briar Mill (1920) Ltd. Sometime in the mid-1950s it was occupied by the Lancashire Cotton Corporation and later Courtaulds Ltd. in 1964. It ceased all cotton production in 1988 when it was converted for warehousing and distribution of catalogue items by a company which was then known as J.D. Williams Ltd. The company also purchased neighbouring Lilac Mill and constructed a bridge to join Briar's second floor to Lilac's first floor. In the early 2000s (decade), operation of the mill transferred to Fulfillment Logistics, a division of J.D. Williams, who continue to use the complex for the same purpose. In the late 1970s, Bolton steeplejack Fred Dibnah was paid £7000 to demolish Briar mill's chimney one brick at a time. His efforts and dare-devil methods are documented in his autobiographic BBC TV series 'The Fred Dibnah Story. | | | | |
| Brook / Crompton Fold | UNKNOWN | Location 53°35′11″N 2°04′43″W | c.1790 | c.1852 | |
| | Notes: The mills earliest records show it to have been built and owned by James Milne of Park House and occupied in 1832 by Samuel Lord who upgraded the mill with a 14 hp (10 kW) steam engine. In 1852, Taylor and Greeves were shown as the mill owners but evidently they weren't very prosperous as production ceased soon afterwards. The mill is shown on 1849 tithe map of the area. In 1908, the land had been given by James Milne to the Church of England who built a sister church to St. James East Crompton on the site and called it St. Saviours Crompton Fold. The Church and its very pleasant setting still remain almost 100 years later. | | | | |
| Cape | P.S. Stott | Refuge Street 53°34′24″N 2°05′38″W | 1900 | 1993 | 93 |
| | Notes: Cape Mill's chimney which was felled, at the time of its demolition, by steeplejack Fred Dibnah. This event was filmed and featured in his autobiographic TV series 'The Fred Dibnah Story'. The site remained empty for several years after the mills' demolition until the land was used for a brand new housing estate. The mill is survived by its original reservoir which is today used for fishing and its namesake Cape Bowling Club complete with bowling green.The only surviving legacy of Cape mill, its reservoir, which stands adjacent to Duke mill's reservoir and is also used for licensed fishing. | | | | |
| Clough | UNKNOWN | Mark Lane 53°34′35″N 2°05′09″W | 1800 | 1990 | 190 |
| | Notes: | | | | |
| Clough | UNKNOWN | Mark Lane 53°34′35″N 2°05′03″W | 1835 | 1934 | 99 |
| | Notes: | | | | |
| Cocker / Diamond Rope Works | UNKNOWN | Cocker Mill Lane 53°34′11″N 2°06′32″W | <1832 | 1994 | |
| | Notes: Diamond Ropeworks, Royton Also known as Cocker Mill and Irk Mill. Built earlier than 1832 originally. Used for fustian cutting by 1891 and taken over in 1897 by Hardman, Ingham & Dawson Ltd for rope and twine making. This ceased following a fire in 1973 and it was taken over in 1975 by Sammy-Woodland Ltd for scarf manufacture. Finally closed 1994 and demolished 1995. The steam engine was saved and is at Bolton. The Shaw/Royton border was altered post demolition so the housing development that replaced it is officially in Royton. | | | | |
| Cowlishaw / Victoria | UNKNOWN | Scowcroft Lane 53°34′21″N 2°06′12″W | <1789 | 1940 | |
| | Notes: | | | | |
| Dawn | P.S. Stott | Eastway SD 940,089 53°34′37″N 2°05′31″W | 1901 | 2006 | 105 |
| | Notes: Built on the site of Shaw Mill at the 'dawn' of the 20th century Dawn mill, up until 2005, was home to distribution company DTS Logistics and used for storing and distributing clothing. It was demolished in 2006 to make way for an Asda supermarket. Although its main gates were located on Eastway, the mill semi-occupied the self titled 'Dawn Street' formerly known as 'Newtown' when Shaw Mill was built there. | | | | |
| Dee | P.S. Stott | Cheetham Street 53°34′43″N 2°05′09″W | 1907 | 1984 | 77 |
| | Notes: The site is now occupied by approximately one seventh of Littlewoods' Shaw National Distribution Centre after the company purchased the land in 1984 and demolished it and neighbouring Ash mill. It technically wasn't completely demolished until 1996, its protected engine house was the only thing stopping further development to the site for over ten years. | | | | |
| Duchess | Wild & Collins | Location 53°35′09″N 2°05′36″W | 1884 | 1960 | 76 |
| | Notes: | | | | |
| Duke | Joseph Stott | Refuge Street 53°34′29″N 2°05′34″W | 1883 | standing | 143 |
| | Notes: Post Cotton production, Duke Mill was home to Osram, the multinational lightbulb manufacturer which occupied both Duke and Cape mills for many years. Osram have since moved away from the United Kingdom, however and the mill is now used for mail order processing. Duke Mill is currently the oldest surviving cotton mill in Crompton and arguably the best maintained. | | | | |
| Elm / Newby | Joseph Stott | Linney Lane (Lyonney Lane)53°34′52″N 2°05′09″W | 1890 | 2022 | 132 |
| | Notes: Opened as Elm mill in 1890 but the name was later changed to Newby. The mill was part of Littlewoods' Shaw National Distribution Centre who adapted it for warehousing and bulk storage for their catalogue distribution operations. It was linked by a newer building to Lily (No.2) mill and by a bridge to a new building that occupies the site of Rutland mill. Signs of its cotton heritage survived until demolition including its engine house with original crane system. Although named 'Shaw 3' by the company its official mill name 'Newby' was still affectionately used by workers at the site. 'Elm' is never used and most people, both workers and local residents, would be unaware of this original name. | | | | |

== F–J ==
| Name | Architect | Location | Built | Demolished | Served (Years) |
|---|---|---|---|---|---|
| Fern | Joseph Stott | Siddall Street 53°34′48″N 2°05′35″W | 1884 | 1983 | 99 |
| | Notes: 1884: 1200hp engine made by Buckley and Taylor of Oldham. It was removed for preservation by Northern Mill Engine Society in 1983. It is shown on their database as being incomplete. 1891: Fern Cotton Spinning Co Ltd, 87,244 spindles, 401/441 twist, 50'/72° weft. | | | | |
| Greenfield | UNKNOWN | Greenfield Lane | 1776 | 1945 | 169 |
| | Notes: | | | | |
| Hawk | A. Turner | Store Street, 53°34′53″N 2°05′32″W | 1908 | 1991 | 83 |

== K–O ==
| Name | Architect | Location | Built | Demolished | Served (Years) |
|---|---|---|---|---|---|
| Laneside | UNKNOWN | Grains Road | 1817 | >1875 | |
| | Notes: | | | | |
| Lilac | P.S. Stott | Beal Lane 53°34′34″N 2°05′20″W | 1918 | standing | 108 |
| | Notes: The building of Lilac actually began in 1914. The first attempt was thwarted by gale force winds on 14 September of that year which brought the predominantly iron structure to the ground with a thundering crash that could be heard for miles around. Fortunately no one was working there at the time and so there were no casualties. The second attempt was completed by 1918 by which time its original purpose for cotton had become a lower priority to World War I and it was initially used as a factory for assembling aircraft components. Finally, it became used for spinning cotton in the following year. The mill was acquired by Fine Spinners and Doublers in 1958. Lilac, along with Park Mill was the last mill in Shaw and Crompton to spin cotton in 1989. Currently part of JD Williams Co Ltd National Distribution Centre, it has been adapted for offices and warehousing, linking in 2000 on two levels to the company's new highbay automated warehouse. The building is currently run by Fulfillment Logistics as a warehouse for the JD Williams catalogue order operation. It is linked by a bridge to Briar mill. | | | | |
| Lily (No.1) | G. Stott | Linney Lane 53°34′47″N 2°05′18″W | 1904 | 2023 | 119 |
| | Notes: Part of Littlewoods' Shaw National Distribution Centre who adapted and extended the mill for offices and warehousing for their catalogue distribution operations. It was linked on four levels to Lily (No.2) mill by a massive bridge. Workers based here seldom referred to this mill as Lily or Lily 1 instead preferring to use the term 'Shaw 1'. | | | | |
| Lily (No.2) | G. Stott | Linney Lane 53°34′47″N 2°05′11″W | 1918 | 2023 | 105 |
| | Notes: Part of Littlewoods' Shaw National Distribution Centre who adapted the mill for warehousing and bulk storage for their catalogue distribution operations. It was linked on four levels to Lily (No.1) mill by a massive bridge and to Newby (Elm) mill by a newer building. It was also linked on one level by another bridge to the company's sorting centre built on the site of the Dee, Ash and Vale mills. Lily 2's engine house was demolished to make way for the latter bridge. As of 2023 the sorting centre, although slated for demolition, is still in use. Workers based here seldom referred to this mill as Lily or Lily 2 instead preferring to use the term 'Shaw 2'. | | | | |
| Lyon | UNKNOWN | Location 53°34′31″N 2°05′51″W | <1852 | 1929 | |
| | Notes: Burnt down. 1891:James Taylor, 41,224 spindles | | | | |
| Moorfield | Joseph Stott | Durden Street 53°34′36″N 2°05′43″W | 1876 | 1974 | 98 |
| | Notes: | | | | |
| Moss Hey / Ivor | UNKNOWN | Beal Lane 53°34′27″N 2°05′26″W | <1789 | 1972 | |
| | Notes: Burnt down | | | | |
| New Mill | UNKNOWN | Rochdale Road 53°34′57″N 2°06′44″W | 1846 | 1884 | 38 |
| | Notes: | | | | |
| New Mill (rebuilt) | UNKNOWN | Rochdale Road 53°34′57″N 2°06′44″W | 1884 | 1926 | 42 |
| | Notes: Burnt down | | | | |
| Oak / Tom Taylors | UNKNOWN | Moor Street 53°34′24″N 2°06′02″W | 1863 | 1937 | 74 |
| | Notes: In 1891 the mill was operated by Thomas Taylor and Son with 60,408 spindles. A terrace building on Moor Street, which was the original lodge for this mill, remained standing for 75 years after the demise of the mill. After years of neglect, it began to collapse until it was completely demolished in 2012. Known as 'Oak Works', the building has had various planning applications submitted for development but never came to fruition. The latest application to build 10 apartments on the site has been approved. | | | | |
| Old Brox | UNKNOWN | Rochdale Road 53°34′56″N 2°06′35″W | 1789 | 1819 | 30 |
| | Notes: Burnt down | | | | |
| Old Brox (Rebuilt) | UNKNOWN | Rochdale Road 53°34′56″N 2°06′35″W | 1819 | 1906 | 87 |
| | Notes: | | | | |

== P–U ==
| Name | Architect | Location | Built | Demolished | Served (Years) |
|---|---|---|---|---|---|
| Park | UNKNOWN | Milnrow Road 53°35′14″N 2°05′13″W | 1834 | 1991 | 157 |
| | Notes: | | | | |
| Rutland | F.W. Dixon & Son | Linney Lane 53°34′51″N 2°05′15″W | 1907 | 1993 | 86 |
| | Notes: Built and run by Rutland Mill Ltd. until it was absorbed, along with many other Crompton based mill companies, into the Courtaulds Group in 1964. In the late 1980s, as Courtaulds moved operations to other parts of the world, the mill was bought by Littlewoods. Under the Littlewoods name it was run as warehousing for a short time before it was demolished and replaced by a new automated storage warehouse. A section of the North-West wall still remains, complete with painted white brick, and is supporting the incline of the entrance road. | | | | |
| Sandy Lane | UNKNOWN | Rochdale Road 53°34′45″N 2°05′48″W | >1863 | 1975 | |
| | Notes: | | | | |
| Sandy Lane (No.2) | UNKNOWN | Rochdale Road 53°34′45″N 2°05′48″W | >1878 | 1975 | |
| | Notes: | | | | |
| Shaw Edge | UNKNOWN | Location | >1818 | <1845 | |
| | Notes: | | | | |
| Shaw Lane | UNKNOWN | High Street | >1844 | 1900 | |
| | Notes: | | | | |
| Shaw Mill | UNKNOWN | Newtown SD 940,089 53°34′37″N 2°05′31″W | 1820 | >1890 | |
| | Notes: | | | | |
| Shaw Spinning | J. Wild | Salts Street 53°34′53″N 2°05′32″W | 1875 | 1972 | 97 |
| | Notes: | | | | |
| Shaw Side / Irk | UNKNOWN | Oldham Road 53°34′16″N 2°05′52″W | <1832 | >1980 | |
| | Notes: 1891: Richard Fitton, 74,000 spindles, 118 looms; | | | | |
| Smallbrook | J. Wild | Nolan Street 53°35′06″N 2°05′30″W | 1875 | 1964 | 89 |
| | Notes: | | | | |
| Springhill | UNKNOWN | Thornham Road 53°34′52″N 2°06′44″W | 1846 | 1938 | 92 |
| | Notes: | | | | |
| Trent | F.W. Dixon & Son | Duchess Street 53°35′09″N 2°05′48″W | 1908 | 1967–1969 | |
| | Notes: | | | | |

== V–Z ==
| Name | Architect | Location | Built | Demolished | Served (Years) |
|---|---|---|---|---|---|
| Vale / Crompton Spinning Co. | UNKNOWN | Beal Lane 53°34′40″N 2°05′20″W | 1861 | 1934 | 73 |
| | Notes: 1891: Crompton Spinning Co, Limited, 63,666 spindles, 24'/34° twist, 601/70° weft | | | | |
| Woodend | UNKNOWN | Milnrow Road 53°35′15″N 2°05′21″W | 1859 | 1968 | 109 |
| | Notes: Also known as Goats mill, this was built as an extension to Park Mill on the opposite side of Milnrow Road. It traded as A. and A. Crompton and Co. In 1883 a 2000 ihp condensing compound J & E Wood engine was fitted. Production ceased in 1964 | | | | |
| Wye | A. Turner & Son | Napier Street 53°35′07″N 2°05′52″W | 1914 | 1974 | 60 |
| | Notes: | | | | |
| Wye (No.2) | A. Turner & Son | Napier Street 53°35′07″N 2°05′57″W | 1925 | 1974 | 49 |
| | Notes: Engine: Shaw, Buckley and Taylor 2,500hp cross-compound. Replaced by electric motors in 1965. | | | | |

== Additional images ==
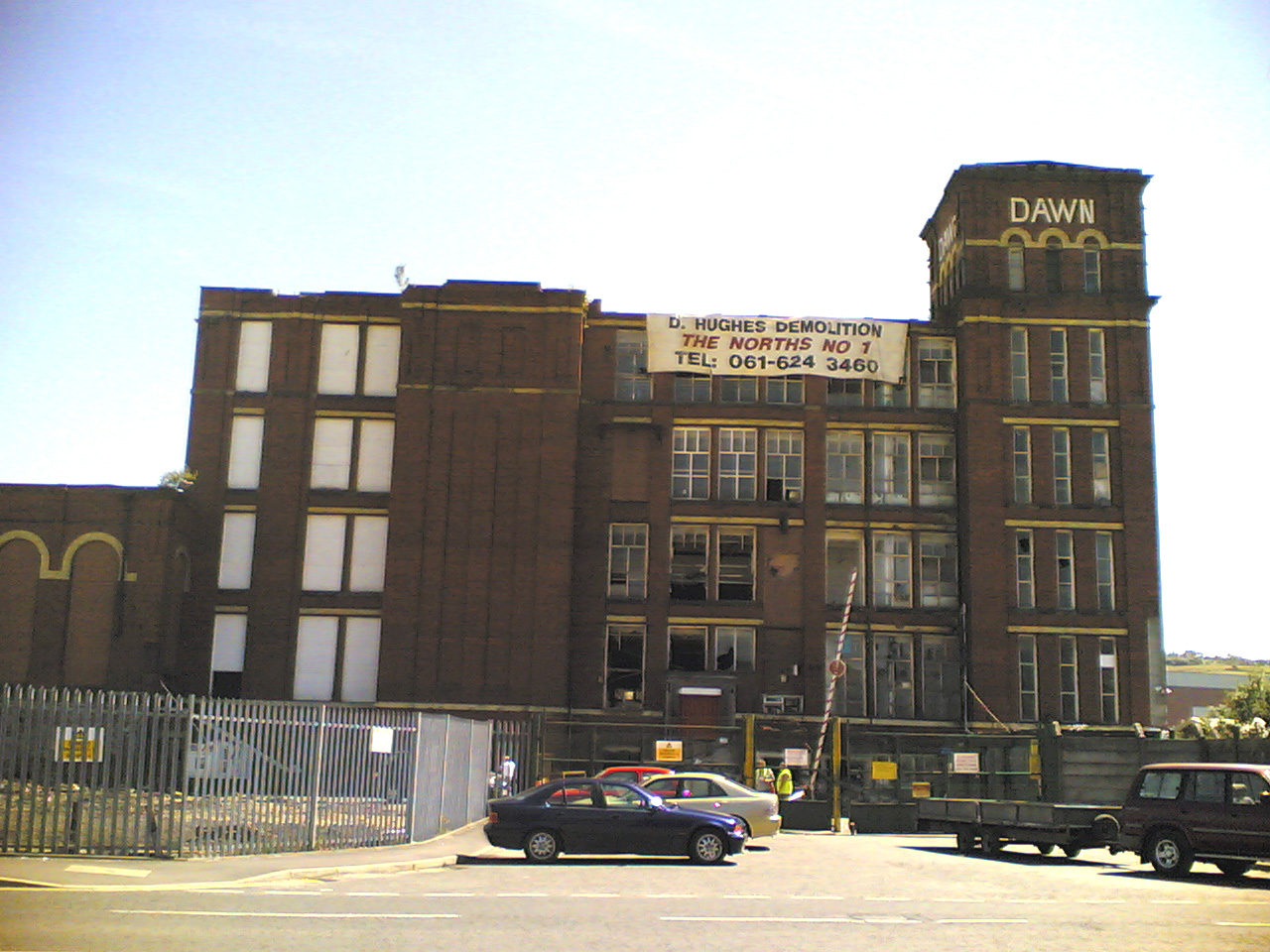
Demolition of 105-year-old Dawn mill began in July 2006 and was completed in September. The land was then redeveloped for construction of a new ASDA supermarket.

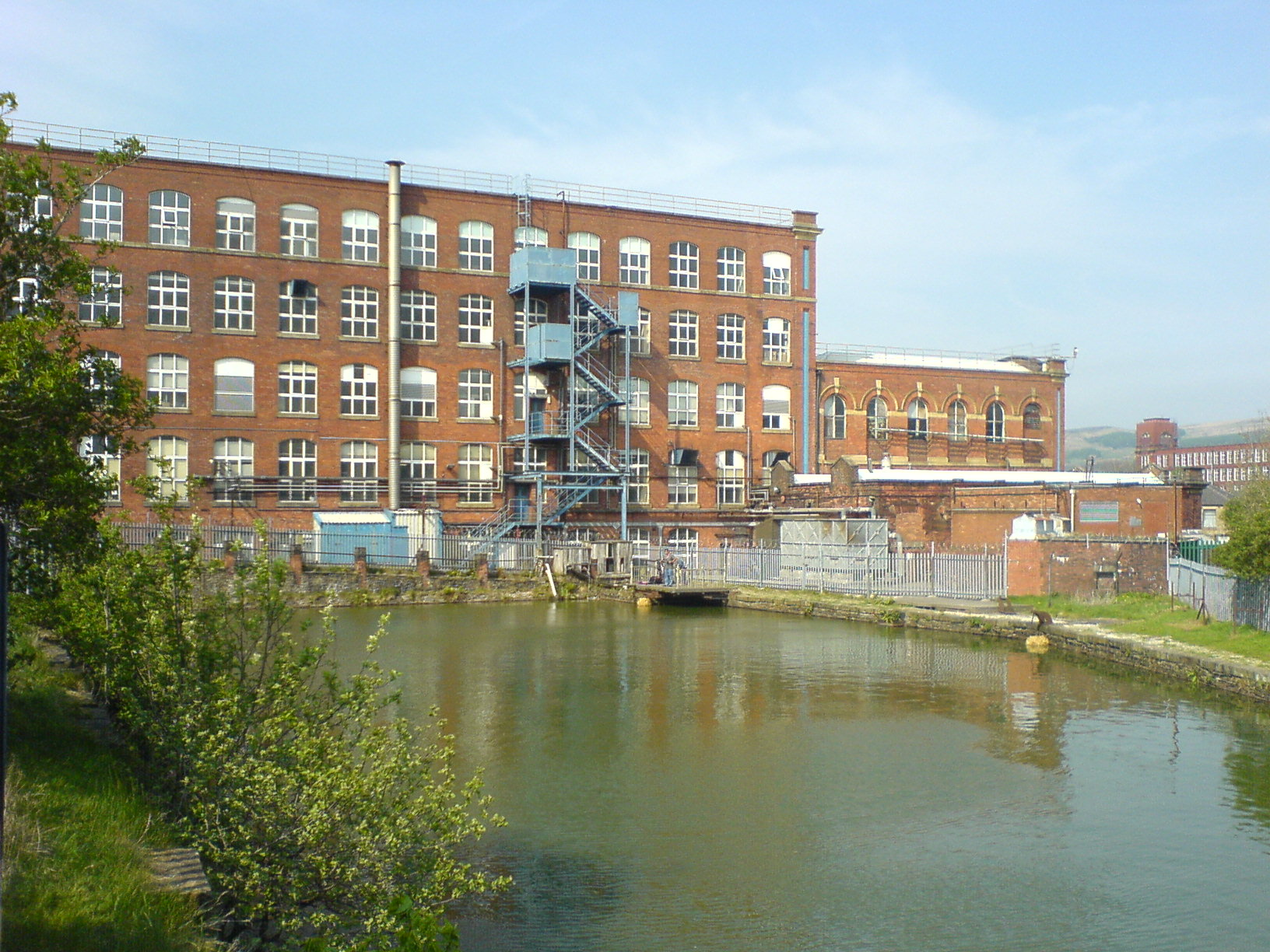
Duke Mill with its original reservoir as seen from the east side of the building. The reservoir today is separately owned and used for licensed fishing.

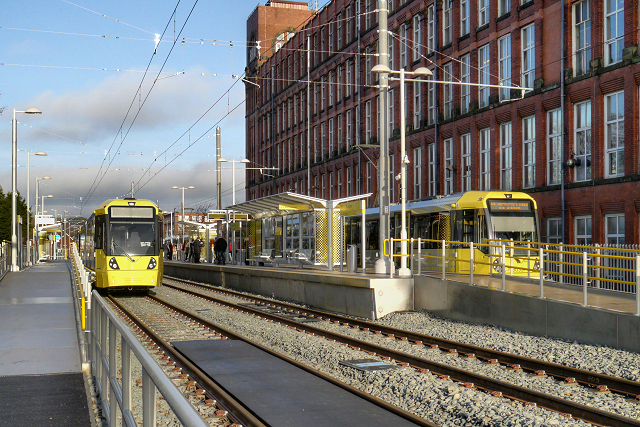
Briar Mill:The Manchester Metrolink was extended to Shaw and Crompton in December 2012, the tram stop is in front of the mill.

== See also ==
- List of mills in Oldham
- List of mills in Chadderton
