= Newby Mill, Shaw =

Cotton mill in Greater Manchester, England

- The mill before 1951

- Location in Greater Manchester

Spinning (mule mill)
- Location: Linney Lane, Shaw and Crompton, Greater Manchester, England
- Owner: Elm Spinning Co. Ltd
- Further ownership: Lancashire Cotton Corporation (1930s); Courtaulds (1964); Clough Mill ()
- Current owners: Littlewoods Stores
- Coordinates: 53.5809°N 2.0857°W

Construction
- Completed: 1890
- Renovated: 1919
- Demolished: 2022

Design team
- Architect: Joseph Stott

Power
- Date: 1890
- Engine maker: Buckley & Taylor
- Installed horse power (ihp): 1100hp

Boiler configuration
- Boilers: Twin Lancashire, coal fired

Equipment
- Manufacturer: Hetheringtons
- Mule Frames: 76860 spindles (1915)
- Ring Frames path: 2976 spindles (1915)

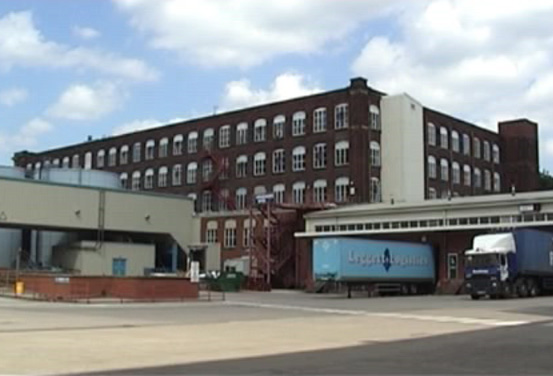
The mill in 2004

Elm Mill was a four-storey cotton spinning mill in Shaw and Crompton, Greater Manchester, England. It was built in 1890 for the Elm Spinning Company Ltd., and was called Elm Mill until it closed in 1928. It was revived by the Lancashire Cotton Corporation in 1929 and called Newby Mill. LCC and all their assets passed to Courtaulds in 1964. Production at Newby finished in 1970, and it was used for warehousing. Subsequently, named Shaw No 3 Mill, it became part of Littlewoods's Shaw National Distribution Centre. It was demolished to make way for housing in 2022.

== Location ==
Shaw and Crompton is a town and civil parish within the Metropolitan Borough of Oldham, in Greater Manchester, England. It lies on the River Beal at the foothills of the Pennines, 2.3 miles (3.7 km) north of Oldham, 3.6 miles (5.8 km) southeast of Rochdale, and 8.7 miles (14 km) to the northeast of the city of Manchester. It is regularly referred to as Shaw. It is not served by any canal but a rail service was provided by the Oldham Loop Line, built in 1863 by the Lancashire and Yorkshire Railway.

== History ==
The manufacture of textiles in Crompton can be traced back to 1474, when a lease dated from that year outlines that the occupant of Crompton Park had spinning wheels, cards and looms, all of which suggest that cloth was being produced in large quantities. The upland geography of the area constrained the output of crop growing, and so prior to industrialisation the area was used for grazing sheep, which provided the raw material for a local woollen weaving trade. Until the mid-18th century, Crompton's textile sector had been closely linked with that of Rochdale and Saddleworth in the north and east; it was a woollen manufacturing district. However, as the demand for cotton goods increased, Crompton mirrored developments in Oldham and Manchester in the south and southwest, importing raw cotton and making cotton cloth.

Oldham rose to prominence during the 19th century as an international centre of textile manufacture. It was a boomtown of the Industrial Revolution, and amongst the first ever industrialised towns, rapidly becoming "one of the most important centres of cotton and textile industries in England", spinning Oldham counts, the coarser counts of cotton.

It was in the second half of the 19th century, that Oldham became the world centre for spinning cotton yarn. This was due in a large part to the formation of limited liability companies known as Oldham Limiteds. In 1851 more than 30 percent of Oldham's population was employed within the textile sector, compared to 5% across Great Britain. At its zenith, it was the most productive cotton spinning mill town in the world. When suitable land in Oldham had become scarce in the 1860s, there was a mill building boom in Shaw and Crompton, giving rise to the area as major mill town. The local townscape became dominated by distinctive rectangular brick-built mills, and its former villages and hamlets agglomerated as a single town around these factories. Shaw and Crompton railway station and a goods yard was opened in 1863, allowing improved transportation of textile goods and raw materials to and from the township. Neighbouring Royton had begun to encroach upon southern boundary, forming a continuous urban cotton-spinning district with Oldham.

By 1871 Oldham had more spindles than any country in the world except the United States, and in 1909, was spinning more cotton than France and Germany combined. The demand for cheap cotton goods from this area prompted the flotation of cotton spinning companies; the investment was followed by the construction of 12 new cotton mills from 1870 and 1900. Elm Mill, was built in 1890 as a part of a group of mills in Linney Lane Shaw.

By 1911 there were 16.4 million spindles in Oldham, compared with a total of 58 million in the United Kingdom and 143.5 million in the world; in 1928, with the construction of the UK's largest textile factory Oldham reached its manufacturing zenith. At its peak, there were over 360 mills, operating night and day;

In the post-war economic boom of 1919–20, investors did not have the time to build new mills and so were prepared to pay vastly inflated sums for shares in existing companies. Many mills were refloated at valuations of up to £500,000 (£22,320,000 as of 2025), or five times what they had cost to build before the war, resulting in the town being nicknamed "The Golden City" as the scramble for shares intensified. Because of this highly profitable share dealing, it was reported in the national press that Shaw and Crompton had more millionaires per capita than any other town in the world. Elm Mill was extended. The number of cotton mills in the township peaked at 36 in 1920.

The industry peaked in 1912 when it produced 8 billion yards of cloth. The Great War of 1914–18 halted the supply of raw cotton, and the British government encouraged its colonies to build mills to spin and weave cotton. The war over, Lancashire never regained its markets. The independent mills were struggling. Elm Mill ceased production in 1928. The Bank of England set up the Lancashire Cotton Corporation (LCC) in 1929 to attempt to rationalise and save the industry. and they bought the mill in 1932 and it was renamed Newby Mill, thus it was one of 104 mills bought by the LCC, and one of the 53 mills that survived through to 1950 as a mule spindle mill supplying mule weft and twist. LCC itself was purchased by Courtaulds in 1964, and Newby Mill was closed in 1970.

From the 1980s up until the start of the 21st century it became part of Littlewoods' Shaw National Distribution Centre who had adapted it for warehousing and bulk storage for their catalogue distribution operations. It was linked by a new building to Lily (No.2) mill and by a bridge to a newer building that occupied the site of Rutland Mill. Signs of its cotton heritage could still be seen including its engine house with original crane system, which remained largely intact.

== Demolition ==
After 132 years of service, the mill was demolished in 2022 to make way for housing.

== Architecture ==
Four-storey Victorian Mill

=== Power ===
Buckley & Taylor, 11,000 hp engine

=== Equipment ===
Hetherington, spinning mule wefts (76,860 spindles) and ring twists (2976 spindles) coarse cotton counts, 8s to 24s.

=== Later extensions ===
1919

== Owners ==
- Elm Spinning Company Ltd.
- Lancashire Cotton Corporation (1930's-1964)
- Courtaulds (1964–)
- Clough Mill storage
- Littlewoods

== See also ==
- Textile manufacturing
