= High Crompton =

Coordinates: 53.581352°N 2.109518°W

- Location within Greater Manchester
- OS grid reference: SD927094
- Civil parish: Shaw and Crompton
- Metropolitan borough: Oldham
- Metropolitan county: Greater Manchester
- Region: North West
- Country: England
- Sovereign state: United Kingdom
- Post town: OLDHAM
- Postcode district: OL2
- Dialling code: 01706
- Police: Greater Manchester
- Fire: Greater Manchester
- Ambulance: North West
- UK Parliament: Oldham East and Saddleworth

High Crompton is a locality in the west of the Shaw and Crompton parish of the Metropolitan Borough of Oldham, in Greater Manchester, England. It is formed around High Crompton Park and Rochdale Road.

High Crompton is in a conservation area.

The area mainly comprises residential housing, but also contains Crompton House Church of England Academy, St Mary's Church of England church and its accompanying primary school of the same name.

The area also boasts a public park with Green Flag status, appropriately named High Crompton Park.

High Crompton is an area of hilly terrain, attaining a high point of around 213 metres (700 ft) above sea level.

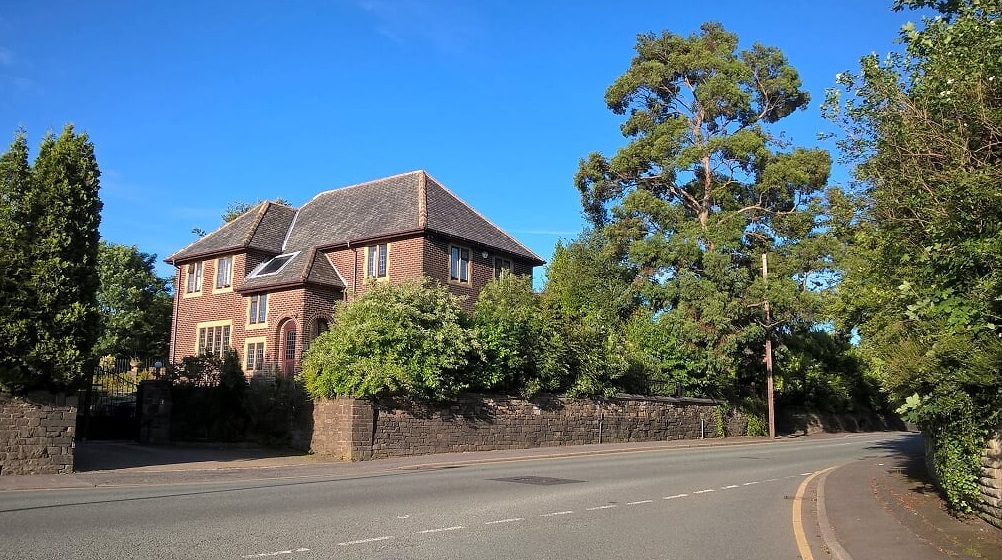
Rochdale Road, High Crompton.

High Crompton is located very close to the M62 motorway and the southern boundary of the Metropolitan Borough of Rochdale. It is connected by road to the neighbouring large towns of Oldham and Rochdale.

Pencil Brook flows through the area towards the River Beal at Goats.

High Crompton is served by three buses in the area. First Greater Manchester's 408 service runs from Buckstones to Stalybridge, via Shaw, Royton and Oldham. The service runs hourly throughout the day, every day until approx 11pm with additional journeys between Buckstones and Oldham during weekdays provided by First's 428 service, which runs via Thornham. Rosso's 435 services also serves Buckstones and Shaw. From High Crompton, the service runs to Rochdale via Turf Hill. The service runs every 30 mins, Monday-Saturday daytime. The other service is First's 403/404 Shaw circular service, linking various parts of Shaw and Crompton. All services link High Crompton with Shaw & Crompton tram stop.
