= Kidnapping of Sahil Saeed =

British boy of Pakistani heritage (born 2004)

Mohammad Sahil Saeed (Urdu: ساحل سعید; born 9 November 2004) is a British boy of Pakistani heritage, born in Oldham, who was kidnapped in the evening of 4 March 2010 in Jhelum, Pakistan. According to Saeed's father Raja Saeed, four armed men took Saeed along with cash and jewellery from their house shortly before they were planning to fly back to Greater Manchester, where the family have lived for seven years. Later the kidnappers demanded a ransom equivalent to £100,000. Saeed and his father were visiting family in Pakistan, although Saeed's mother and two younger sisters were at home in Shaw and Crompton.

== Investigation ==
It was believed that someone in the family may have been involved in the kidnapping, however, Saeed's father rejected this. Six suspects were arrested during the raids carried out by Pakistani police on that night including a taxi driver who was hired to take Sahil Saeed and his father Raja Saeed to the airport for their return flight to the United Kingdom. There was speculation that corrupt police officers may have been involved in the incident.

The law enforcement operation to find the captors after Saeed's release took place across four countries (Pakistan, the United Kingdom, France and Spain) and involved monitoring the suspects' telephones.

== Reaction ==
Pakistan Prime Minister Yousaf Raza Gillani telephoned the parents of the boy on the 6 March 2010 to assure them that the government would make an all out effort to rescue the child. while Pakistan Interior Minister Rehman Malik said the incident was "humiliating" after visiting the family. Pakistan's High Commissioner in Britain, Wajid Hassan, said that he believed the culprits could be associated with some of the boy's own relatives and that detectives were "looking at the possibility of a sort of inside job" as there had been a perception that the family was wealthy. Phil Woolas, the Immigration Minister and MP for Oldham East and Saddleworth, said that "this is the number one priority for the Foreign Office in Pakistan but the focus is still on the police operation". The spokesman of Foreign & Commonwealth Office issued a statement saying 'We call on whoever is holding Sahil to return him to his family.'

== Release ==
On 11 March 2010, Wajid Hasan, Pakistan’s High Commissioner in the UK, said Saeed had been found, however, Pakistani officials would not confirm this. Hasan later dismissed the earlier reports but said he believed the abduction was linked to a family dispute and he was optimistic that the boy would be released soon.

On 16 March 2010, Saeed was freed after a ransom was paid. Kidnappers in Spain ordered his father to pay money in Pakistani rupees in France. He returned to Oldham on 18 March 2010.

Just over a week later on 25 March 2010, two men were arrested in Pakistan, on the suspicion of kidnapping Saeed. The local police in Pakistan said that they had arrested the men in the same city where the boy was kidnapped. Weapons, explosives and belongings stolen from the Saeed family home were also recovered. Regional police chief Aslam Tareen said the kidnapping was opportunistic and that "No family member was involved in this case. Reports about a family link in the kidnapping were wrong".

== See also ==
- British Pakistanis
