= Shaw, Greater Manchester =

Town in Borough of Oldham, Greater Manchester

Coordinates: 53.5783°N 2.09511°W

Shaw
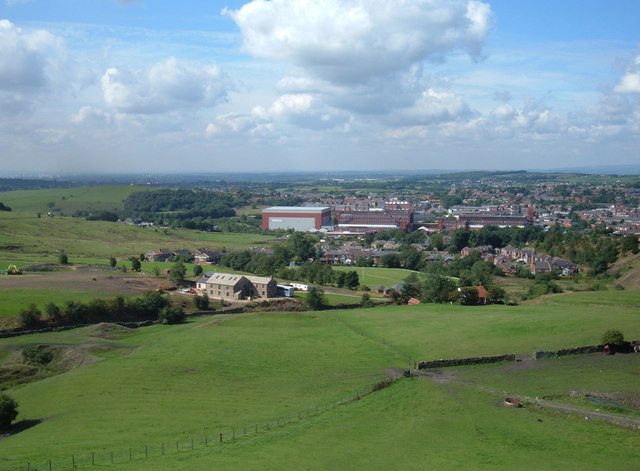
- A view of Shaw and Crompton

- Location within Greater Manchester
- Area: 4.025 km^{2} (1.554 sq mi)
- Population: 18,245 (2021 census)
  - Density: 4,533/km^{2} (11,740/sq mi)
- Civil parish: Shaw and Crompton
- Metropolitan borough: Oldham
- Metropolitan county: Greater Manchester
- Region: North West
- Country: England
- Sovereign state: United Kingdom
- Post town: Oldham
- Postcode district: OL2
- Dialling code: 01706
- Police: Greater Manchester
- Fire: Greater Manchester
- Ambulance: North West

Shaw is a ward and part of the built-up area in the civil parish of Shaw and Crompton, in the Oldham district, in the county of Greater Manchester, England. It is about 9 miles from Manchester city centre. In 2021 the built-up area of Shaw and Crompton had a population of 18,245. In 2021 the ward had a population of 10,045. Until 1974 it was in Lancashire.

== History ==
The name "Shaw" comes from the Old English sceaga meaning "copse" or "small wood" and was recorded as Shaghe in 1555.
