= Crompton House Church of England Academy =

Crompton House CE School

Location
- Rochdale Road; Shaw and Crompton, Greater Manchester, OL2 7HS; England; 53.58125°N 2.1074°W

Information
- Type: Academy
- Motto: Latin: Sapere Aude ("Dare to know")
- Religious affiliation: Church of England
- Established: 19 September 1926
- Founder: Mary Crompton
- Local authority: Oldham Council
- Department for Education URN: 137294 Tables
- Ofsted: Reports
- Chairman of Governors: Gordon Main
- Headteacher: Karl Newell
- Gender: Coeducational
- Age: 11 to 18
- Enrolment: 1494
- Houses: Cocker; Crompton; Ormerod; Ridley
- Colours: Black and gold
- Alumni: Old Cromptonians
- Website: cromptonhouse.org

Crompton House CE School is a coeducational Church of England secondary school and sixth form located in the High Crompton area of Shaw and Crompton in the Metropolitan Borough of Oldham, Greater Manchester, England.

It was established in 1926 when Crompton House was donated by a prominent local land owner, Mary Crompton, to the Church of England to be used as a school. The school has expanded over the years as the school created new places for more pupils to receive more funding. The school is affiliated with the Church of England, and younger pupils are required to attend the Anglican church in order to be admitted to the school, although this is subject to change given the additional 112 pupils per year for the 2018 intake. This is not the case for the sixth form, admission to which is based on secular grounds. Crompton House uses a house system. All pupils are in mixed year group houses, which include Cocker, Crompton, Ormerod and Ridley. These House names are the surnames of individuals who have contributed to the creation of Crompton House as a school.

The school has proposed expansion plans, with planning consolation currently underway, expected to increase staff from the current 100 teachers and the total number of students by 50% from 1120 students to 1680 students for the 2018 intake. (an additional 112 places per year group in year 7 to year 11)

The buildings are currently made up of a number of 19th-century buildings and modern extensions, although a potential redesigns are currently underway to allow the accommodation of the additional 560 students.

In January 2019, the school was rated 'Good' by Ofsted.

Crompton House underwent an expansion process, creating a new three-storey building on the grounds of the tennis courts to allow an increase of 50% (560 pupils), details of the current planning application can be found on the Oldham Councils Website. Given the need for additional pupils is due to international immigration (source Oldham Council Future Education Provision), a change to the admissions policy is also anticipated.

The school has experienced rapid declines in GCSE performance. Between 2017 and 2019, the percentage of students who obtained Grade 5 or above in English & Maths GCSEs fell from 60% to 45%. Performance in Progress 8, a metric of how much improvement was made by students between KS2 and KS4, was below the national average. Disadvantaged pupils performed significantly worse than the national average in all metrics and worse than the local average in most.

== History ==
Crompton House, much like Crompton Hall, was originally a primary dwelling of the Crompton family, who since the Norman Conquest had a majority land ownership of Shaw and Crompton. Crompton House was donated in 1926 by Mary Crompton and her cousin, Anne Ormerod, on the understanding it would become a school with a strong Christian ethos. The then Dean of Manchester, Dr. Hewlett Johnson, declared open the new Higher Grade Church School to be known as Crompton House School on 29 September and the first 25 pupils were admitted on 1 October. It is now a co-educational, voluntary aided secondary school catering for about 1400 pupils with a sixth-form.

Over the years additions have been made to the original buildings. These include a separate Year 11 block, a craft building, science laboratories new sixth-form accommodation. A new block of classrooms and science laboratories was opened in 1994. More recently, a block of ten new classrooms has been opened. A drama studio has also been built.

Whilst this is a Church of England school, when available the school will also offer places to children from other Christian denominations. The school is also a Post-Graduate Teacher Training Centre, and since September 1998 has Beacon status. Crompton House was awarded Specialist School Status in 2005 as an Arts College (Music, Art and Drama).

In 2011, more than 2/3 of teaching staff took part in strike action. Teachers then went on strike during 2023-24

In 2018, plans to expand the school were met with significant resistance from parents of students and local residents. Despite this, the plans were approved. Building work took place during school time, with power tools and machinery used during teaching time, creating noise pollution. School kitchens were also not operational, leaving students without warm food during the winter. Some students were unable to attend at the start of term in 2019 due to lack of teaching space.

In recent times, Crompton House self academised and the current headteacher made himself CEO of the new trust. Since then, the Crompton House Trust has recruited several local primary schools, top slicing the schools’ budgets to afford high executive pay for the CEO, in return for school places at Crompton House for the primary school pupils.

== Musical achievements ==
The music department of the school has a variety of groups including two orchestras, swing and brass bands, and several choirs. The senior orchestra played at the Royal Albert Hall in London as part of the Schools Proms in 2005, and the Senior Choir has sung in venues such as Manchester Cathedral, York Minster, and Liverpool Cathedral. The choir has sung evensong in Westminster Abbey, and the Boys' Choir has sung in St Asaph Cathedral. On 2 July 2010 the orchestra, brass band and choirs combined to perform Karl Jenkin's The Armed Man at the Royal Northern College of Music in Manchester.

== Sixth form ==
Crompton House has a sixth form. Subjects offered include Art and Design, Biology, Business Studies, Chemistry, Design Technology, Economics, English Language, English Language and Literature, English Literature, Food and Nutrition, French, General Studies, Geography, Government and Politics, German, History, ICT, Mathematics, Multimedia, Music, Physical Education, Physics, Psychology, Sociology, Theatre Studies, Philosophy & Ethics, and Travel and Tourism.

== Old Cromptonians ==
- Anna Friel, actress
- Jessica Fullalove, GB swimmer
- Ian Greaves, football player and manager
- Michelle Marsh, glamour model
- Ben Pearson, football player at Preston North End
- Clive Rowe MBE, actor
- Matt Walls, cyclist
- Stuart Bithell MBE, sailor

=== Staff ===
- Musician John Lees, music technician until July 2012.

== Headteachers ==
- Mr S. Selwyn, 1926–1938
- Mr J. Hargreaves, 1938–1958
- Mr D. Shepherd, 1958–1964
- Mr E. Harris, 1964–1985
- Mr M. Taylor, 1985–1999
- Mr D. Bowes, 2000–2002
- Mr W. Grundy, 2002–2006
- Mrs V. Musgrave, 2006–2008
- Mrs E. Tough, 2008–2011
- Mrs S. Calvert, 2012– 2014
- Mr K. Newell (Executive Headteacher from 2023), 2014–
- Mrs. S. Hegarty (Head of School), 2023-

== In the news ==
In November 2006, Crompton House had a bomb scare when a year 11 pupil took in what appeared to be a First World War hand grenade for a history lesson.
