= Shaw and Crompton =

Civil parish in Greater Manchester, England

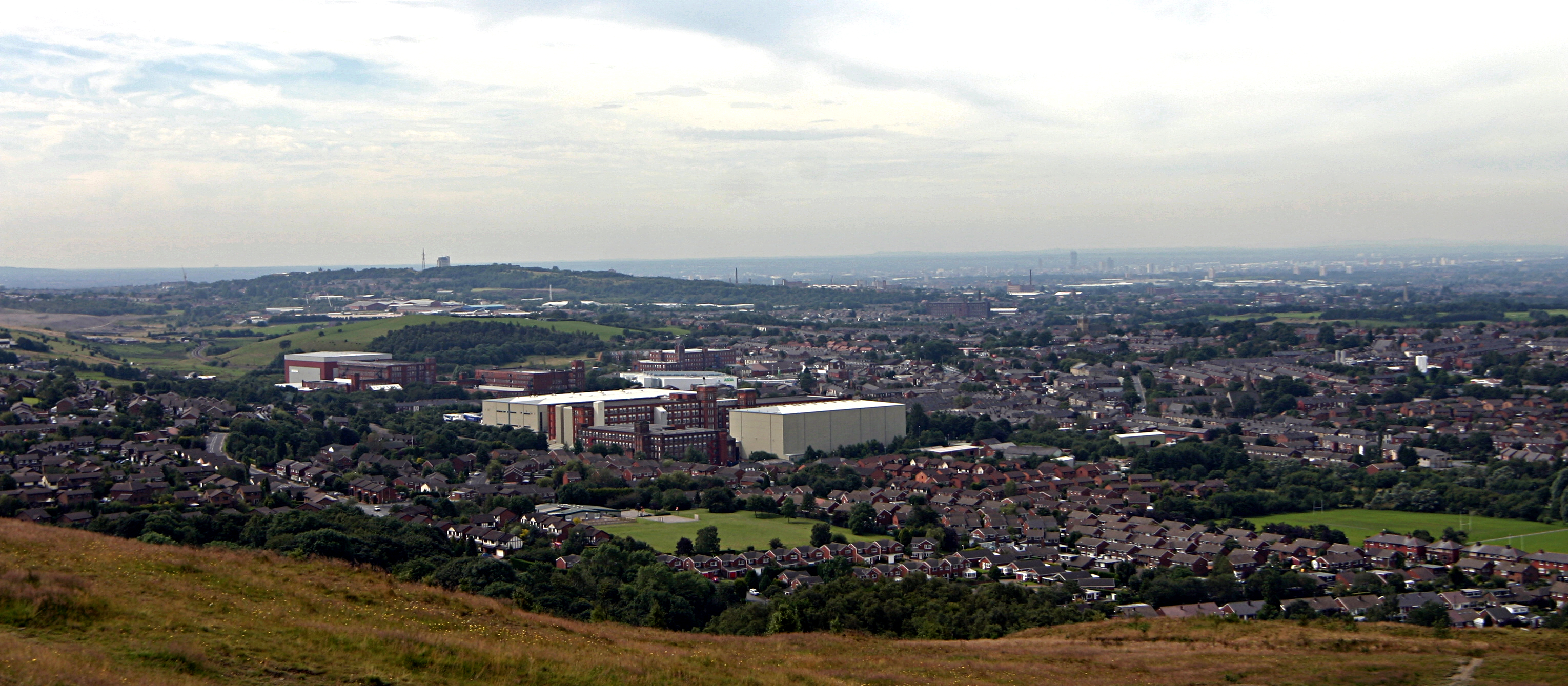
- A view of Shaw and Crompton from Crompton Moor

- Location within Greater Manchester
- Area: 4.5 sq mi (12 km^{2})
- Population: 21,065 (2011 census)
  - Density: 4,681/sq mi (1,807/km^{2})
- OS grid reference: SD938090
  - London: 166 mi (267 km) SSE
- Civil parish: Shaw and Crompton
- Metropolitan borough: Oldham
- Metropolitan county: Greater Manchester
- Region: North West
- Country: England
- Sovereign state: United Kingdom
- Post town: Oldham
- Postcode district: OL2
- Dialling code: 01706
- Police: Greater Manchester
- Fire: Greater Manchester
- Ambulance: North West
- UK Parliament: Oldham East and Saddleworth

Shaw and Crompton is a town and civil parish in the Metropolitan Borough of Oldham, Greater Manchester, England, and lies on the River Beal at the foothills of the South Pennines. It is located 2 miles (3.2 km) north of Oldham, 4 miles (6.4 km) south-east of Rochdale and 9 miles (14 km) north-east of Manchester City Centre. Its largest settlement is Shaw.

Historically a part of Lancashire, the area shows evidence of ancient British and Anglian activity. In the Middle Ages, Crompton formed a small township of scattered woods, farmsteads, moorland and swamp. The local lordship was weak or absent, and so Crompton failed to emerge as a manor with its own lord and court. Farming was the main industry of this rural area, with locals supplementing their incomes by hand-loom woollen weaving in the domestic system.

The introduction of textile manufacture during the Industrial Revolution initiated a process of rapid and unplanned urbanisation. A building boom began in Crompton in the mid-19th century, when suitable land for factories in Oldham was becoming scarce. By the late 19th century, Crompton had emerged as a densely populated mill town with forty-eight cotton mills, some of the largest in the United Kingdom, in the area. At its spinning zenith, as a result of an interwar economic boom and the over-valuation of shares associated with the textile industry, Shaw and Crompton had more millionaires per capita than any other town in the world. Imports of foreign cotton goods saw a decline in the textile industry by the mid-20th century and the last mill closed in 1989.

Shaw and Crompton covers 4.5 square miles (11.7 km^{2}) and is a predominantly suburban area of mixed affluence with a population of 21,065 as of 2011. The legacy of its industrial past persisted in the form of cotton mill conversion to logistics and distribution hubs for Yodel and The Very Group in the early 21st century.

== History ==
=== Toponymy ===
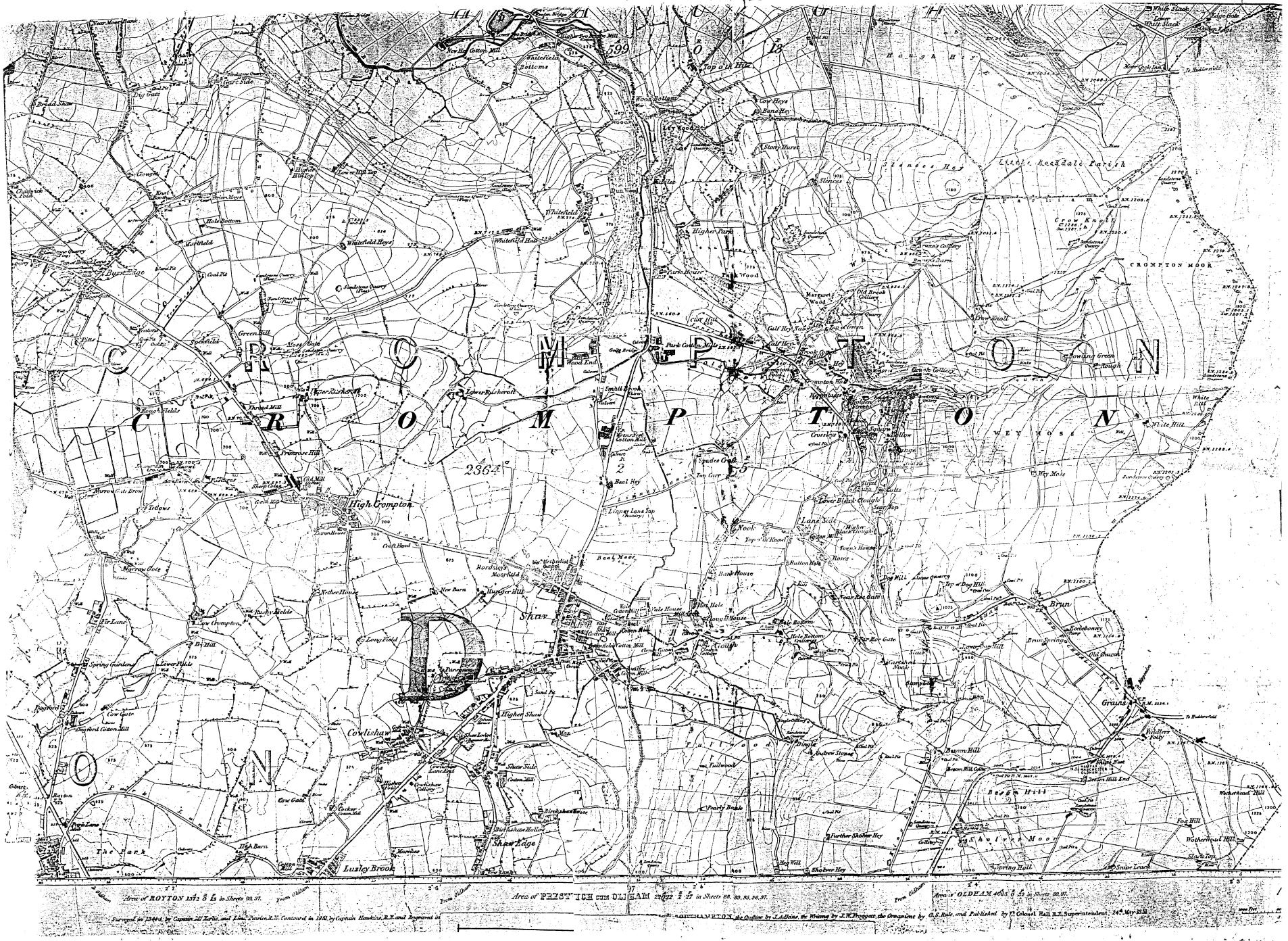
A map of Shaw and Crompton from 1851. Shaw was originally a village in the township of Crompton, but came to dominate the locality, winning preference as the name for the whole area.

The name Shaw is derived from the Old English word sceaga, meaning "wood". The name Crompton is also of Old English derivation, from the words crom or crumb, meaning "bent" or "crooked" and ton, for "hamlet or village". A local historian stated that "this name aptly describes the appearance of the place, with its uneven surface, its numerous mounds and hills, as though it had been crumpled up to form these ridges". The University of Nottingham's Institute for Name-Studies has offered the suggestion that the name Crompton means "river-bend settlement", which may reflect Crompton's location on a meander of the River Beal.

The dual name of both Shaw and Crompton has been said to make the town "distinctive, if not unique", while preference of Shaw over Crompton and vice versa has been (and to a limited extent remains) a minor local controversy and point of confusion. Today, the single name of Shaw seems to have won preference in the locality.

Shaw was originally a hamlet and sub-district of Crompton, where it appears to have originated as the commercial and ecclesiastic centre because of a small chapel sited there dating back to the 16th century. Before then, Whitfield had been the largest village in Crompton. In 1872, Shaw was noted as one of three villages in Crompton. However, due to Shaw's urbanisation following the construction of a major road from Werneth to Littleborough, and the establishment of a post office sub-district named and situated in Shaw, it came to dominate Crompton. Additionally, a separate ecclesiastical parish was created for the township in 1835, which was given the name Shaw because of the church's location on Shaw Moor, in Crompton. The names merged to form the present day Shaw and Crompton, which boundary markers have used since at least the 1950s.

=== Early history ===
An early type of axe known as a palstave has been discovered on Crompton Moor, providing evidence of Bronze Age human activity. It is believed that the area was inhabited by Ancient Britons, and that the Brigantes gave the River Beal its name. An ancient track, perhaps of Roman origin, crosses the modern Buckstones Road leading to Castleshaw Roman fort in neighbouring Saddleworth.

In 616 Æthelfrith of Bernicia, an Anglo-Saxon king, crossed the Pennines with an army and passed through Manchester to defeat the Britons in the Battle of Chester. A wave of Anglian colonists followed this military conquest and their settlements are identified by the Old English suffix ton in local place names. Royton, Middleton, Moston, Clayton, Ashton and Crompton are localities northeast of Manchester which may have been founded during that colonisation, suggesting that Crompton as a settlement could date from the 7th century.

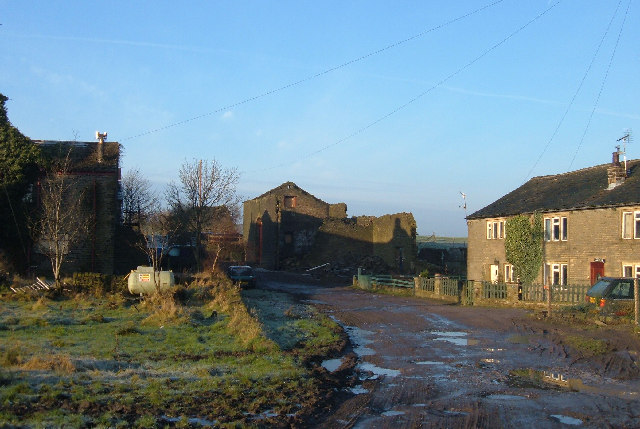
Whitfield: during the Middle Ages, this cluster of homesteads was owned by the Knights Hospitaller and was the largest settlement in the area.

During Anglo-Saxon England, it is assumed from toponymic evidence that the township of Crompton formed around a predominantly Anglian community with a few Norse settlers, and within the extensive Hundred of Salfordshire. Following the Norman Conquest of England, Crompton was part of a vast estate given to Roger the Poitevin. It was unmentioned in the Domesday Book of 1086; the first recorded use of the name Crompton for the township was discovered in legal documents relating to Cockersand Abbey near Lancaster, dating from the early 13th century. The document outlines that Gilbert de Notton, a Norman who had acquired the land from Roger de Montbegon, granted his estate to Cockersand Abbey. The Knights Hospitaller and Whalley Abbey held small estates in the township. In 1234, about 80 acres (32 ha) of land at Whitfield in Crompton were given to the Hospitallers, a religious order that provided care for poor, sick or injured pilgrims to the Holy Land. A medieval cross has been discovered in the ruins of a house at Whitfield.

During the High Middle Ages, Crompton was a collection of scattered woods, farmsteads, moorland, swamp and a single corn mill, occupied by a small and close community of families. The area was thinly populated and consisted of several dispersed hamlets, including Whitfield, High Crompton, Cowlishaw, Birshaw and Bovebeale (above Beal). These hamlets were situated above the water-logged valley bottoms and below the exposed high moors. Owing to complicated local arrangements of land tenure, inheritance and absentee landlords, the local lordship was weak and Crompton failed to emerge as a manor with its own lord and court. This slowly facilitated comparative freedoms and independence for the early people of Crompton, which encouraged the influx of families from the neighbouring parish of Rochdale, including the Buckleys, Cleggs, Greaves and Milnes.

During the Late Middle Ages, the Buckley and Crompton families were recorded as the largest landowners in Crompton, owning land and farmsteads at Whitfield and Crompton Fold respectively. The Crompton family has a well-documented history and can be traced back to the time of Magna Carta, appearing in the Assize Roll for 1245. Crompton is indigenous to the township, and first appears as a family name in the 13th century, when the locality's principal landowner, Hugh de la Legh, changed his family name to "de Crompton" (of Crompton), to reflect the estate he possessed. The family owned a large historic house by the name of Crompton Hall, on the site of Crompton Fold. Crompton Hall first appears in historical records as early as 1442, owned by Thomas de Crompton and his family. The original "medieval" Crompton Hall was demolished around 1848. A second Crompton Hall, set in its own prominent forested grounds, was erected by the family—by then an influential and affluent investor in the local cotton industry—but following the death of the last remaining family members, the site was sold and, in 1950, the house was demolished to make way for an exclusive development of bungalows.

Because of the poor soils and rugged terrain, Samuel Lewis said Crompton's inhabitants were "a race of hardy and laborious men". They have also been described as having a reputation for being a "hardy, frugal and somewhat independent breed", which has been attributed to the tradition of absentee landlords and self-sustenance in earlier times. There had been a chapel of ease at the hamlet of Shaw since at least the early 16th century, but, due to ecclesiastical arrangements for the parish of Prestwich-cum-Oldham, the inhabitants were obliged to contribute money towards Oldham Parish Church, which in turn had obligation to the mother Church of St Mary the Virgin at Prestwich. On several occasions during the 15th and 16th centuries, the Archdeacon of Chester had to intervene because Crompton's inhabitants refused to contribute towards holy bread and candles used at Prestwich. In 1826, a poll was taken regarding the re-building of Oldham Church. Not one person in Crompton voted in favour of the rebuilding and when a rate was levied to raise money for the new church at Oldham, the people of Crompton refused to pay.

=== Textiles and the Industrial Revolution ===
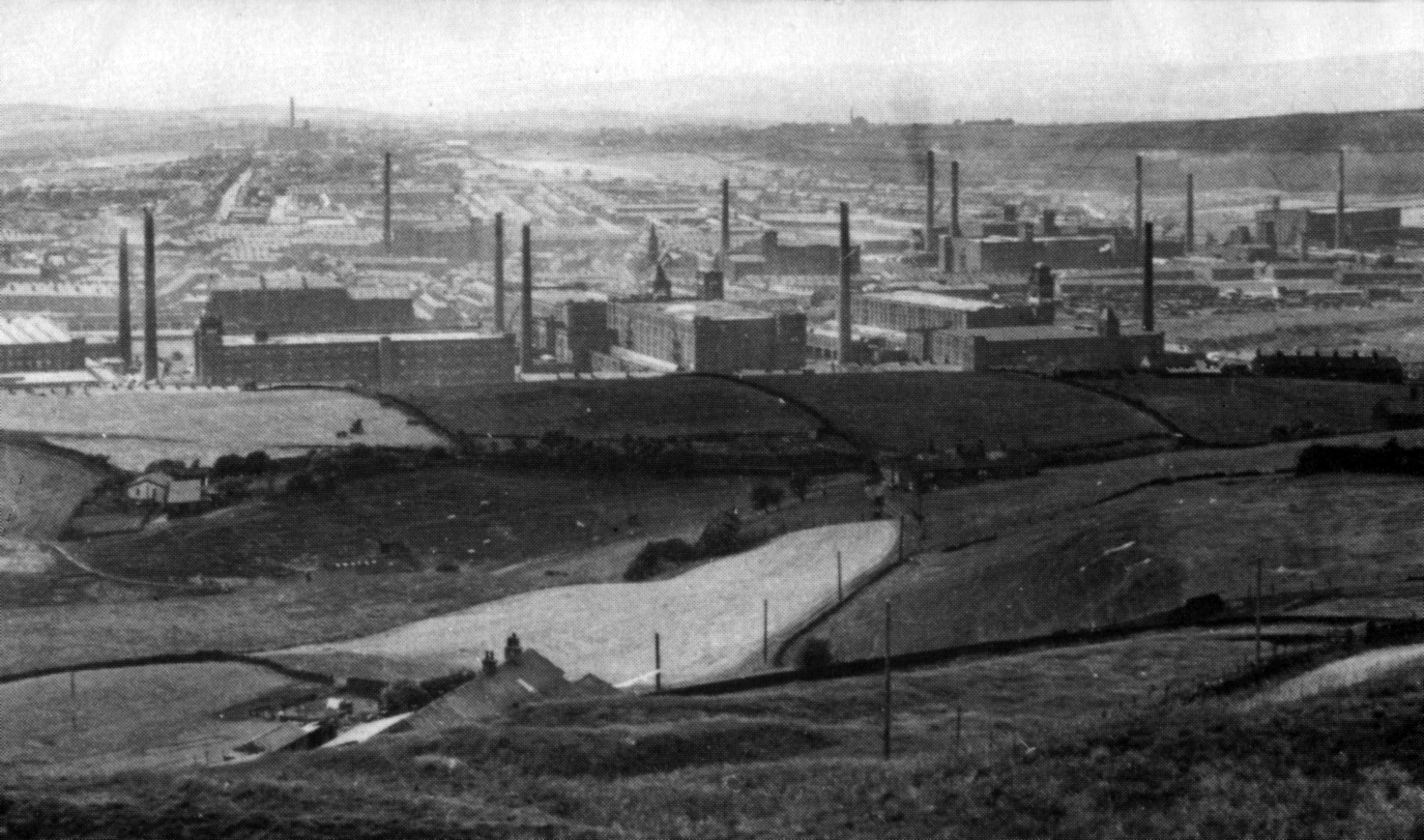
Following a building boom during the 1860s–1870s, Shaw and Crompton became a mill town, dominated by large rectangular brick-built cotton mills.

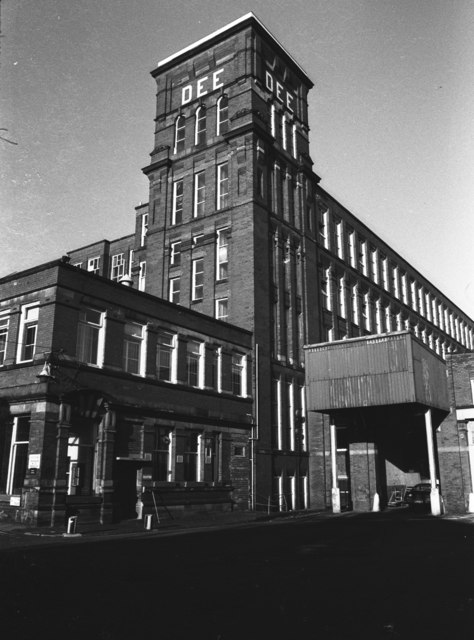
Dee Mill was designed by Philip Sydney Stott, and built in 1907. Demolished in 1984, the Shaw National Distribution Centre now occupies its site.

The manufacture of textiles in Crompton can be traced back to 1474, when a lease dated from that year outlines that the occupant of Crompton Park had spinning wheels, cards and looms, all of which suggest that cloth was being produced in large quantities. The upland geography of the area constrained the output of crop growing, and so prior to industrialisation the area was used for grazing sheep, which provided the raw material for a local woollen weaving trade. Wills and inventories from the 15th and 16th centuries suggest most families were involved with small scale pasture, but supplemented their incomes by weaving woollens in the domestic system and selling cloth, linen and fustians to travelling chapmen for the markets in Manchester and Rochdale. Despite its remoteness by the Pennines, by the Early Modern period the domestic system in Crompton had produced relatively wealthy inhabitants. The most affluent were those involved in cloth and linen, and their wealth was comparable to that of the merchants of Manchester and Salford.

Until the mid-18th century, Crompton's textile sector had been closely linked with that of Rochdale and Saddleworth in the north and east; it was a woollen manufacturing district. However, as the demand for cotton goods increased, Crompton mirrored developments in Oldham and Manchester in the south and southwest, importing raw cotton and making cotton cloth. To ensure that the woollen trade was kept buoyant, a law existed from 1675 to 1814 to encourage Shaw and Crompton's wool production. It required that the deceased were to be buried in woollen garments.

In the second half of the 18th century, the technology of cotton-spinning machinery improved, and the need for larger buildings to house bigger, better and more efficient equipment became apparent. The profitability of cotton spinning meant that open land that had been used for farming since antiquity, was utilised for purpose-built weavers' cottages. Larger buildings were still desired, and construction of two water powered cotton factories (two or three times the size of a cottage) can be traced to 1782. The construction of more mills followed—ten by 1789—facilitating a process of urbanisation and socioeconomic transformation in the region; the population moved away from farming, adopting employment in the factory system. The introduction of the factory system led to an increase of the township's population; from 872 in 1714 to 3,500 in 1801, mostly as a result of an influx of people from Yorkshire and Lancashire looking for employment in the cotton mills.

Power looms introduced in the early 19th century put an end to the last remnants of the domestic system in Crompton, but not without resistance. Weavers and spinners were paid according to the amount of cloth they produced; independent hand loom weavers saw a drop in their income, and could not compete with the mechanised mass production that was gathering pace in the township. Luddites rioted in the township in 1826, smashing 24 power looms at Clegg's mill at High Crompton in protest against their worsening standard of living.

Crompton's damp climate provided the ideal conditions for cotton spinning to be carried out without the cotton drying and breaking, and newly developed 19th century mechanisation optimised cotton spinning for mass production for the global market. When suitable land in nearby Oldham (then the largest and most productive mill town in the world) had become scarce in the 1860s, there was a mill building boom in Shaw and Crompton, giving rise to the area as major mill town. The local townscape became dominated by distinctive rectangular brick-built mills, and its former villages and hamlets agglomerated as a single town around these factories. Shaw and Crompton railway station and a goods yard was opened in 1863, allowing improved transportation of textile goods and raw materials to and from the township. Neighbouring Royton had begun to encroach upon the township's southern boundary, forming a continuous urban cotton-spinning district with Oldham, Lees and Chadderton—the Oldham parliamentary constituency—which was responsible for 13% of the world's cotton production.

The demand for cheap cotton goods from this area prompted the flotation of cotton spinning companies; the investment was followed by the construction of 12 new cotton mills from 1870 and 1900. In the post-war economic boom of 1919–20, investors did not have the time to build new mills and so were prepared to pay vastly inflated sums for shares in existing companies. Many mills were refloated at valuations of up to £500,000 (£22,320,000 as of 2025), or five times what they had cost to build before the war, resulting in the town being nicknamed "The Golden City" as the scramble for shares intensified. Because of this highly profitable share dealing, it was reported in the national press that Shaw and Crompton had more millionaires per capita than any other town in the world. The number of cotton mills in the township peaked at 36 in 1920.

Supplies of raw cotton from the United States were cut during the Lancashire Cotton Famine of 1861–1865, leading to the formation of the Crompton Local Board of Health in 1863, whose purpose was to ensure social security and maintain hygiene and sanitation in the locality. The Great Depression, and First and Second World Wars each contributed to periods of economic decline in Shaw and Crompton. Although the industry endured, as imports of cheaper foreign yarns increased during the mid-20th century, Shaw and Crompton's textile sector declined gradually to a halt; said to have over-relied upon the textile sector, cotton spinning reduced in the 1960s and 1970s, and by the early 1980s only four mills were operational. In spite of efforts to increase the efficiency and competitiveness of its production, the final cotton was spun in Shaw and Crompton in 1989, in Lilac and Park mills. Of the 48 cotton mills that have occupied Shaw and Crompton, only three are still standing, all of which are now used as distribution centres.

=== Post-industrial history ===
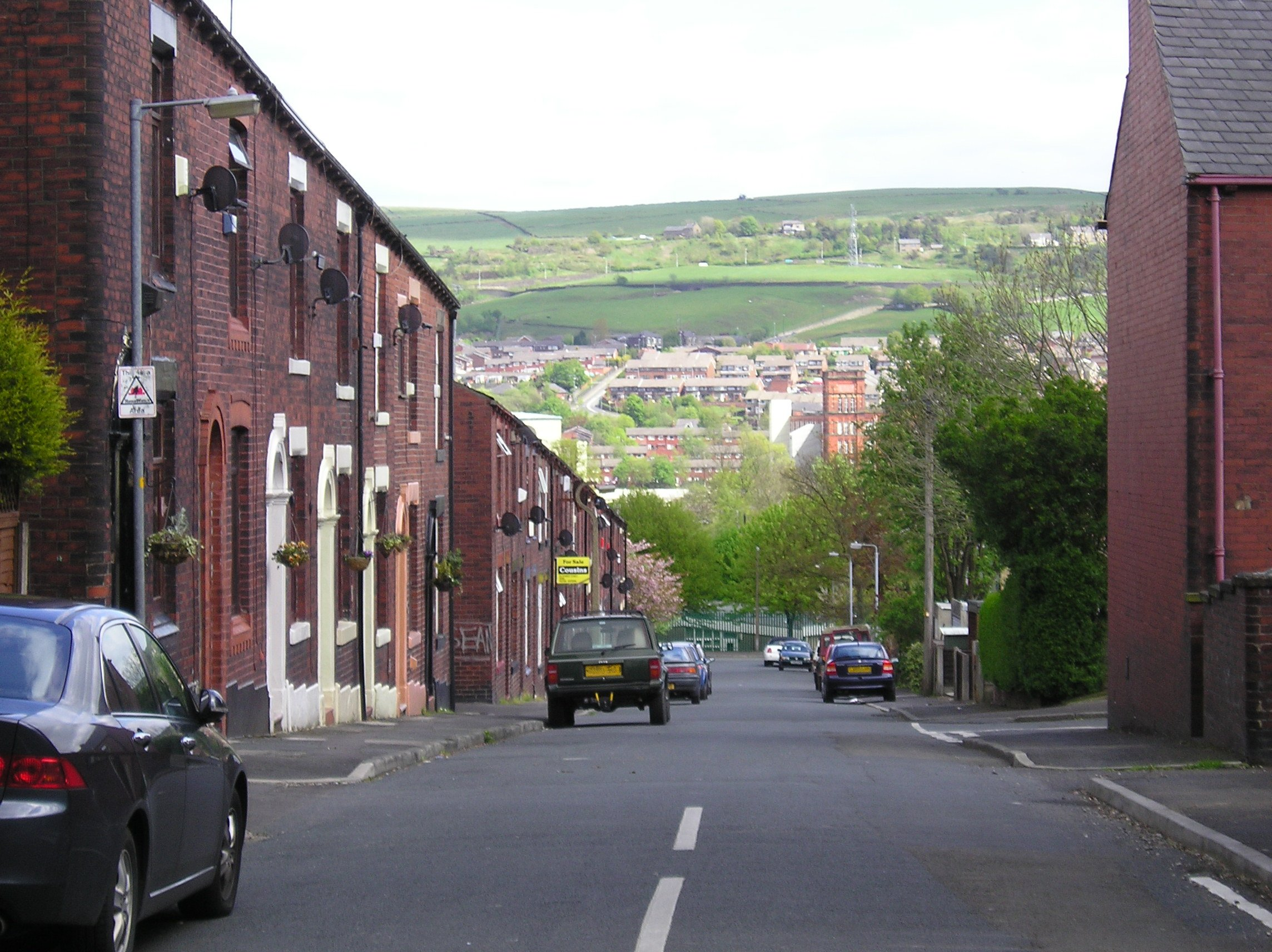
Alfred Street is an Edwardian terraced street. Around a third of Shaw and Crompton's property is terraced, reflecting the area's history as a mill town.

Since deindustrialisation, Shaw and Crompton's population has continued to grow as a result of intensive housing expansion and redevelopment which has modernised much of its former Victorian and Edwardian terraced housing districts. The town has 9,274 residential dwellings, of which one third are Victorian or Edwardian terraces, built for the cotton mill workers of former times. It is considered a popular residential area of relative prosperity, with a variety of housing types. The Buckstones and Rushcroft areas contain modern housing estates and are amongst the most affluent suburbs of the town. They were built as part of an agreement made in the 1950s between the then Crompton Urban District and the County Borough of Oldham councils, to alleviate Oldham's chronic shortage of quality housing. The town has subsequently been described as having "good community spirit and relative prosperity, which, in turn, create popular residential areas".

Shaw and Crompton has been used as a filming location for domestic films and television programmes, including The Parole Officer, Common As Muck, Scott & Bailey and The Fred Dibnah Story, the latter of which documented Fred Dibnah's demolition of the Briar and Cape mill chimneys. The town entered the national media in 2010, 2011 and 2012; for the kidnapping of Sahil Saeed, the mugging and death of Nellie Geraghty (which featured on Crimewatch), and the explosion of a house in Buckley Street respectively. Shaw and Crompton Metrolink station opened as part of Greater Manchester's light-rail Metrolink network on 16 December 2012.

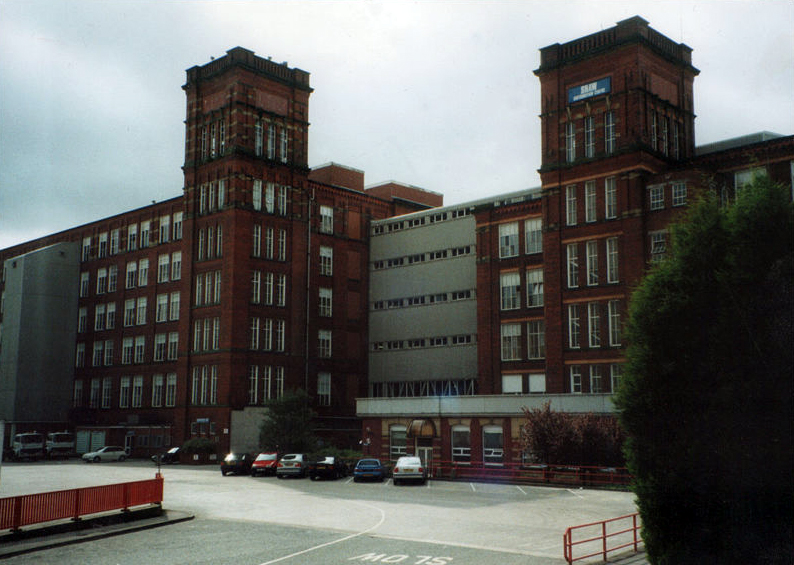
Shaw National Distribution Centre: a major employer of the local and wider communities

From the 18th century onwards, Shaw and Crompton's economy was closely tied with that of Britain's textile manufacture during the Industrial Revolution, particularly the cotton spinning sector.

Until the 1990s, Shaw and Crompton was the home of Osram, the multinational lightbulb manufacturer, which occupied Duke Mill and was a significant employer in the area. Production has since been moved away from the United Kingdom. Warburtons had one of its 11 major bakeries in Shaw and Crompton from 1965 to January 2012. The "Pennine" bakery produced around 500,000 loaves a week and distributed them to major multiples and independent retailers throughout Greater Manchester, Cheshire, and Derbyshire. Located on Glebe Street, it employed around 200 staff and produced a wide range of Warburtons bread products. In August 2012 the building was bought by UDUNK who propose to redevelop the building as commercial units for up to 6 businesses.

Until the early 2020s Shaw and Crompton was home to Shop Direct Group's Shaw National Distribution Centre, which was one of the UK's largest warehouse distribution centres. The company occupied three former cotton mills and state-of-the-art purpose-built storage and sorting facilities on a 20-acre (8.1 ha) complex within the town. In 2007, the site became the retail company's only packing and distribution centre for non-bulk items. At its peak it employed nearly 1,000 staff, making it the Metropolitan Borough of Oldham's largest private employer.

== Governance ==
This emblem, introduced in 1987, is found at the parish border markers of Shaw and Crompton, as well as on some street furniture.

Crompton was recorded in 1212 as being one of the five parts of the thegnage estate of Kaskenmoor, which was held on behalf of King John by Roger de Montbegon and William de Nevill. The other parts of this estate were Glodwick, Sholver, Oldham, and Werneth, names and places still familiar today. Crompton would later form a township within the ancient ecclesiastical parish of Prestwich-cum-Oldham, in the hundred of Salford. Throughout the Middle Ages, local men acted as jurors and constables for the purposes of upholding law and order in the township.

Following the Poor Law Amendment Act 1834, Crompton formed part of the Oldham Poor Law union, an inter-parish unit established to provide social security. Crompton's first local authority was a Local board of health established in 1863; Established with reference to the Local Government Act 1858, Crompton Local Board of Health was a regulatory body responsible for standards of hygiene and sanitation in the township. Following the Local Government Act 1894, the area of the Local Board became the Crompton Urban District, a local government district within the administrative county of Lancashire. The urban district council was based out of Shaw/Crompton Town Hall, which opened on 28 December 1894.

Under the Local Government Act 1972, the towns urban district status was abolished and the area has, since 1 April 1974, formed part of the Metropolitan Borough of Oldham, a local government district of the metropolitan county of Greater Manchester. A civil parish of Crompton was formed in April 1987 and renamed to "Shaw and Crompton" in July 1987. The civil parish has its own parish council, giving it some limited local government autonomy from that of the wider Metropolitan Borough of Oldham, and including the status as a statutory consultee on local planning applications. The council comprises 14 locally elected members and is consulted in planning applications that affect the area through the Shaw and Crompton area Committee of Oldham Metropolitan Borough Council. Shaw and Crompton (Community Forum)Community Council, a separate body, meets at least four times per year and is designed to allow local people to put forward their priorities for the area in which they live, suggest improvements and have their say on how services are run on a local basis. Shaw and Crompton does not have a mayor, but does have a Chair of Council who performs ceremonial duties, charitable and chairing duties of the council. The Parish Council also has a town crier who jointly with the chair performs ceremonial duties in and around the parish area and is a purely ceremonial role. Shaw and Crompton is one of only a few parishes of England that still observes the ancient custom of Beating the bounds. Originally an annual event, it now takes place every seven years.

In terms of parliamentary representation, Shaw and Crompton after the Reform Act 1832 was represented as part of the Oldham parliamentary borough constituency, of which the first Members of Parliaments (MPs) were the radicals William Cobbett and John Fielden. Winston Churchill was the MP between 1900 and 1906. Churchill once stayed at Crompton Hall, and letters written by him describe how peaceful and tranquil he thought the area to be. Constituency boundaries changed during the 20th century; from 1885 to 1918 Shaw and Crompton lay within Prestwich constituency, from 1918 to 1950 in Royton constituency, from 1950 until 1983 in Heywood and Royton constituency, and from 1983 to 1997 in Littleborough and Saddleworth constituency. Since 1997, Shaw and Crompton has lain within the parliamentary constituency of Oldham East and Saddleworth, and is represented in the House of Commons by Debbie Abrahams, a member of the Labour Party.

== Geography ==
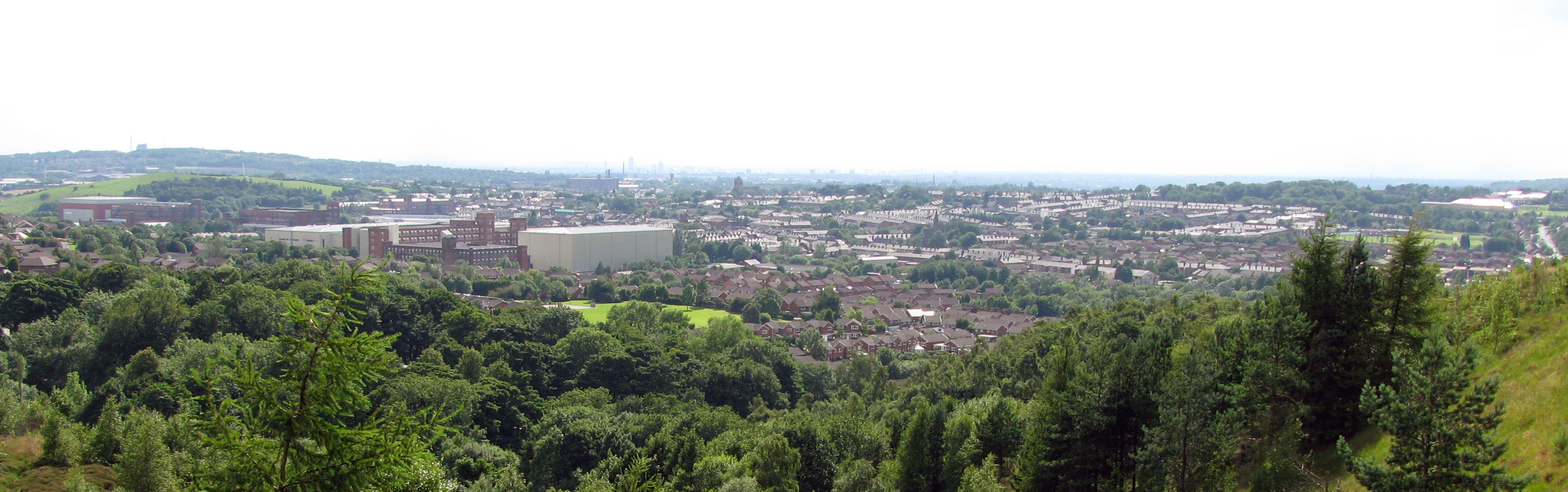
View of Shaw and Crompton from above Pingot Quarry by Crompton Moor. Shaw is in the foreground with Oldham over the hill to the left, Royton is centre-right with Manchester in the distance.

At 53°34′39″N 2°5′32″W (53.5777°, −2.0928°) Shaw and Crompton lies along the eastern edge of the ancient Lancashire border; Saddleworth and the Pennines are close to the east. The larger towns of Rochdale and Oldham lie to the northwest and south respectively; Royton is 1.2 miles (1.9 km) west-southwest. There are no motorways in Shaw and Crompton, though a light rail line bisects the town from north to south. The town has a post office under the Oldham post town. The territory of the civil parish is given as 4.5 square miles (11.7 km^{2}). For purposes of the Office for National Statistics, Shaw and Crompton forms part of the Greater Manchester Urban Area, with Manchester city centre itself 8.7 miles (14.0 km) southwest of Shaw and Crompton.

Described in Samuel Lewis's A Topographical Dictionary of England (1848) as located in "a bleak situation", Shaw and Crompton is in the valley of the River Beal, which runs northward through the town towards the village of Newhey. The land to the east of the town steadily rises, reaching a height of 1,283 feet (391 m) at the summit of Crompton Moor. To the west, the land reaches around 699 feet (213 m) at High Crompton and 825 feet (251 m) at Whitfield, and from these highpoints the surface slopes away in all directions. The River Irk rises on Shaw and Crompton's western boundary with Royton. The geology is represented by carboniferous coal measures. The soils of the town are broadly sterile, the poorest being in the upland moors. Rainfall rises steadily from the Cheshire Plain in a northeasterly direction, and totals are between 51 inches (1,295 mm) to 67 inches (1,702 mm) a year in Shaw and Crompton, which is well above the UK average of 45.4 inches (1,153 mm) and compares to about 33 inches (838 mm) a year at Ringway.

Shaw and Crompton's built environment is similar to the urban structure of most towns in England, consisting of residential dwellings centred on a High Street in the town centre, which is the local centre of commerce. There is a mixture of low-density urban areas, suburbs, semi-rural and rural locations in Shaw and Crompton, but overwhelmingly the land use in the town is residential; industrial areas and terraced houses give way to suburbs and rural greenery as the land rises out of the town. Generally, property in the centre, west, and south of the town is older and smaller in comparison to that found in the east and north.

Shaw and Crompton is divided into two political wards, named "Shaw" and "Crompton" (to the east and west respectively).

== Demography ==
Shaw and Crompton compared
2001 United Kingdom census	Shaw and Crompton	Oldham (Met. District)	England
Total population	21,721	217,273	49,138,831
Foreign born	3.2%	8.2%	9.2%
White	96%	86%	91%
Asian	2.0%	12%	4.6%
Black	0.3%	0.6%	2.3%
Christian	84%	73%	72%
Muslim	1.7%	11%	3.1%
Hindu	0.2%	0.1%	1.1%
No religion	6.8%	8.9%	15%
Over 65 years old	15%	14%	16%
Unemployed	2.4%	3.7%	3.3%

According to census data, in 2001 Shaw and Crompton had a total resident population of 21,721, with a population density of around 4,692 people per square mile (1,811 per km^{2}), and an average age of 39. Around 3% of Shaw and Crompton's population is from a black and minority ethnic background (which includes a small but long established community of Bangladeshi heritage), the rest broadly being of white background.

Of the residents in the combined electoral wards of Shaw and Crompton (which are coterminous with the town) 41.7% were married, 9.2% were cohabiting couples, and 9.7% were lone parent families. Forty percent of households were made up of individuals, and 14% had someone living alone at pensionable age.

The ethnicity of the town was given as 96% white, 0.5% mixed race, 2.0% Asian, 0.3% black and 0.2% Chinese or other.

The place of birth of the town's residents was 96.8% United Kingdom (including 95.13% from England), 0.6% Republic of Ireland, 0.5% from other European Union countries, and 2.1% from elsewhere in the world. Religion was recorded as 84% Christian, 1.7% Muslim, 0.2% Hindu, 0.2% Buddhist, 0.1% Jewish and <0.1% Sikh. Some 6.8% were recorded as having no religion, 0.1% had an alternative religion, and 5.6% did not state their religion.

The economic activity of residents aged 16–74 was 45% in full-time employment, 12% in part-time employment, 7% self-employed, 2.4% unemployed, 2% students with jobs, 3% students without jobs, 13% retired, 4% looking after home or family, 7% permanently sick or disabled, and 2% economically inactive for other reasons. This was roughly in line with the national figures. Of the town's residents aged 16–74, 15% had a higher education qualification or the equivalent, compared with 20% nationwide.

Below is a table outlining population growth of the area since 1901. Earlier records show that the area had a population of 872 in 1714.

Year	1901	1911	1921	1931	1939	1951	1961	1971	1991	2001	2011	2021
Population	13,427	14,750	14,917	14,764	12,796	12,559	12,708	17,026	21,093	21,721	21,065	20,374
Source:A Vision of Britain through Time

== Economy ==
Shaw and Crompton has been a base for distribution companies as a result of the town's good transport links, its supply of large, disused mill properties, and its situation between Manchester, Oldham, Rochdale, Lancashire, and West Yorkshire. The N Brown Group, and children's toy distributors Toy Options have distribution centres in the town.

Trent Mill Industrial Estate, on the edge of the town near Rushcroft, takes its name from the mill that was once there. The business park is home to several small industrial companies. It was partially destroyed by a fire that started in a plastics factory in the early hours of 28 April 2007.

On 6 August 2007, a 35,000-square-foot (3,252 m^{2}) Asda supermarket opened on the site of the former Dawn Mill. A derelict row of houses on Eastway was demolished as part of this development. Two houses on Greenfield Lane were also demolished, allowing the existing ALDI store to expand—possibly to help it to compete with the new ASDA store. The original planning application was put to a public vote in 2005, and included proposals for 316 parking spaces, improved bus facilities, pedestrian routes linked to Market Street, junction improvements to nearby streets, and the relocation of a local tyre-fitting company. The supermarket cost £20 million to construct, and is the first ASDA store in the United Kingdom to use environmentally friendly construction techniques, which Wal-Mart intends to use as a blueprint for all its new ASDA supermarkets. It incorporates a sustainable timber frame and an energy-saving ventilation system, which together have eradicated the need for 500 tonnes of steel and 450 tonnes of carbon emissions.

== Landmarks ==
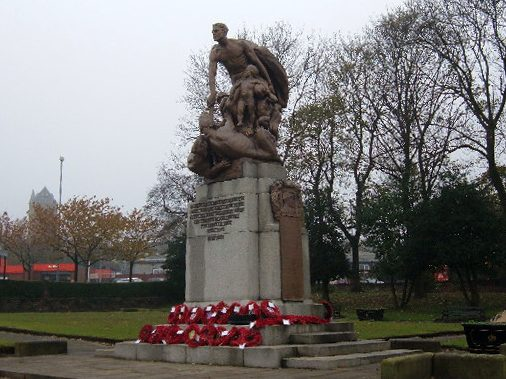
Crompton War Memorial

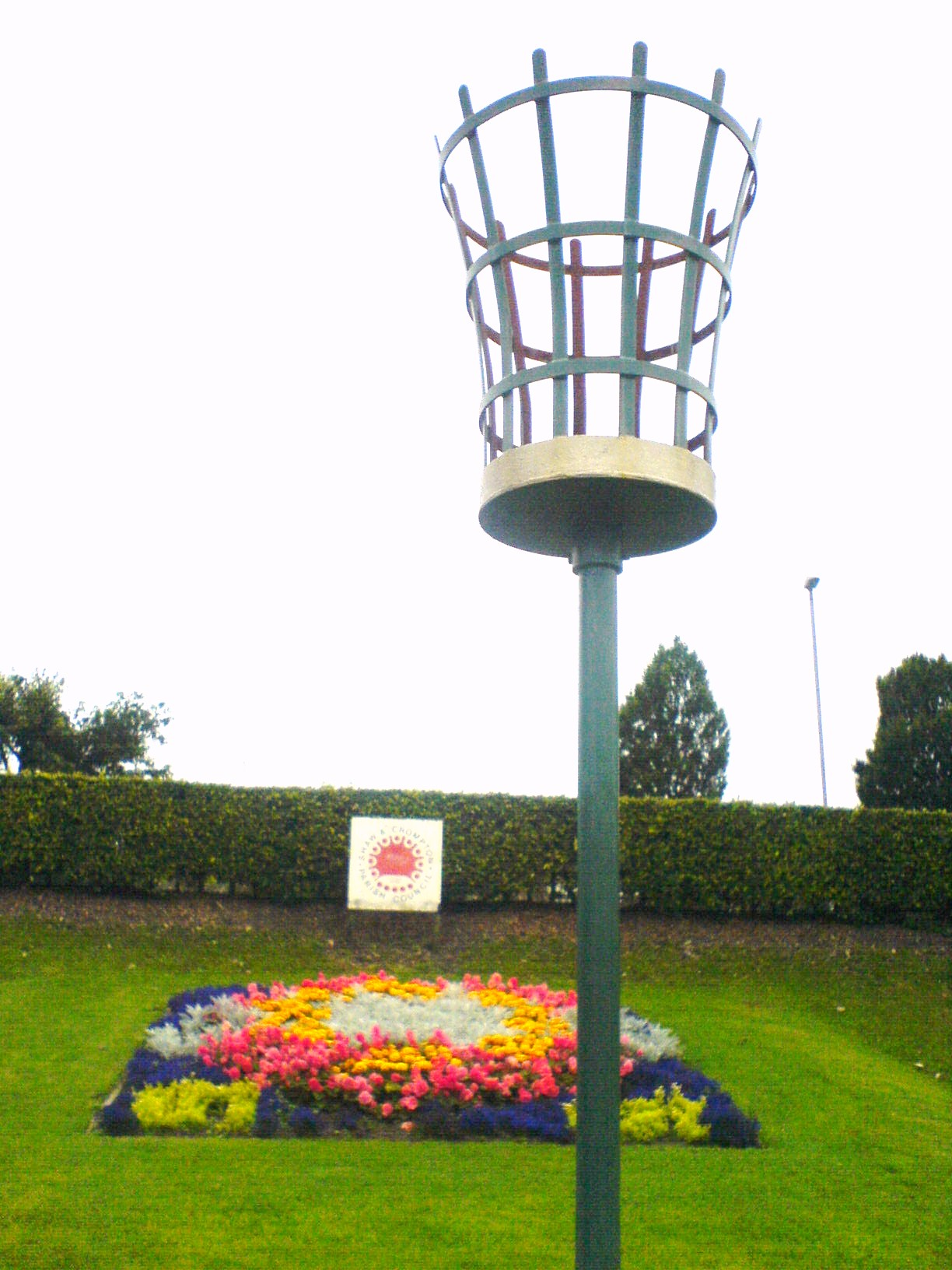
The Shaw and Crompton Beacon

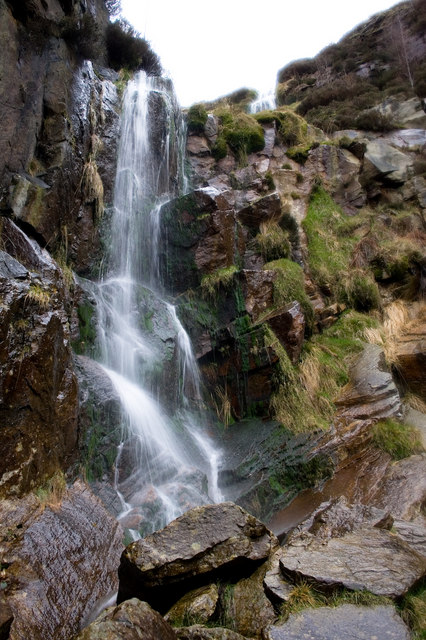
Crompton Moor features an unnamed waterfall.

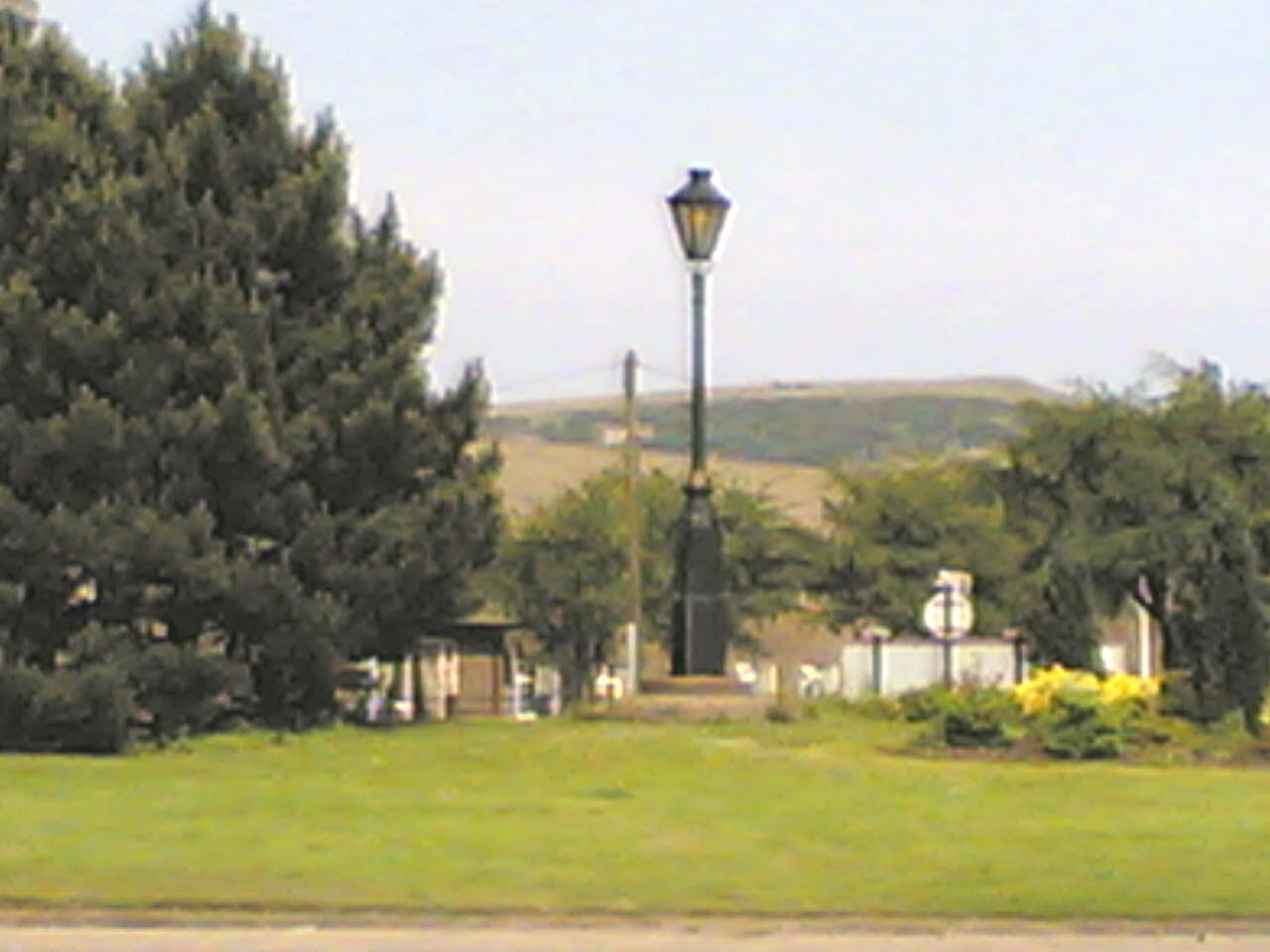
The current Big Lamp. Crompton Moor can be seen in the background.

=== War memorials ===
The main Crompton War Memorial, located on the High Street, consists of a Scottish granite plinth surmounted by a large bronze statue flanked by two Rolls of Honour containing the 346 names of those from Shaw and Crompton who fought and died in the First World War. Panels listing the Roll of Honour from the Second World War were added and unveiled on 12 November 1950 by Councillor H. M. Turner. Commissioned by the Crompton War Memorial Committee, the statue was conceptualised in 1919 by Richard Reginald Goulden, and unveiled on 29 April 1923 by General Sir Ian Hamilton. The original cost for the memorial alone was £4,000, but the total cost, including site and layout, was about £6,067.

The inscription on the memorial reads:

"In memory of the men of Crompton who fought and gave their lives to free mankind from the oppression and brutal tyranny of war. 1914–1919."

The symbolic memorial depicts a group in which the central figure is a man defending the future generations, represented by young children, against foreign aggression, represented by a beast. The memorial is also a time capsule. Inside it is a lead casket containing coins, a copy of the local newspaper, three cops of spun cotton, and a length of cloth manufactured in the local area.

A second, smaller war memorial is located in Jubilee Gardens. It is dedicated to the soldiers who fought in the Second Boer War. It consists of a plaque built into a stone wall that is located between two large bushes.

Its inscription reads:

"In memory of the Crompton men who lost their lives in the South African war 1899–1902"

It then lists eight men: four who were "killed in action", two who "died of wounds", and two who "died of disease".

=== Shaw and Crompton Beacon ===
In 1995, to mark the 50th anniversary of the ending of the Second World War, a landmark known as the Shaw and Crompton Beacon was erected in Jubilee Gardens.

The inscription on the plaque below the beacon reads:

"The Shaw and Crompton beacon
erected by the Parish Council in 1995 to
commemorate the fiftieth anniversary of
the ending of World War Two"

This plaque was presented by members of the British Legion

=== Crompton Moor ===
Spanning approximately 160 acres (0.6 km^{2}), and reaching an elevation of 1,282 feet (391 m), Crompton Moor is one of the largest open spaces run by Oldham Countryside Service. It is a registered common of Greater Manchester, and, since 2003, a designated Site of Biological Importance. Brushes Clough and Pingot are former coal and sandstone quarries on Crompton Moor. During the 1970s, quarrying was halted, the land was reclaimed, and thousands of pine trees were planted. The area has since been used for recreation, including hiking, orienteering, and mountain biking. Brushes Clough Reservoir was constructed in the 19th century by the Oldham County Borough Council, using stone quarried from this site. The area is now managed by United Utilities.

Since the 1960s an unnamed waterfall (provisionally called Crompton Waterfall) cascades off Crompton Moor into the now unused Pingot Quarry forming the Old Brook, a tributary of the River Beal.

=== Big Lamp ===
The Big Lamp is a local landmark. Originally, it was a six-sided gas-powered public street lamp standing 20 feet (6 m) high at the original cross-road junction of Manchester Road, Oldham Road, High Street, and Church Road. This was demolished on 17 June 1925, when electric lighting was introduced. During the 1970s, the junction was redeveloped to accommodate the new Crompton Way bypass. A large roundabout was built, and a scaled-down replica of the original Big Lamp was erected in its centre. The new Big Lamp is electrically powered and stands about 6 feet (2 m) high.

== Transport ==
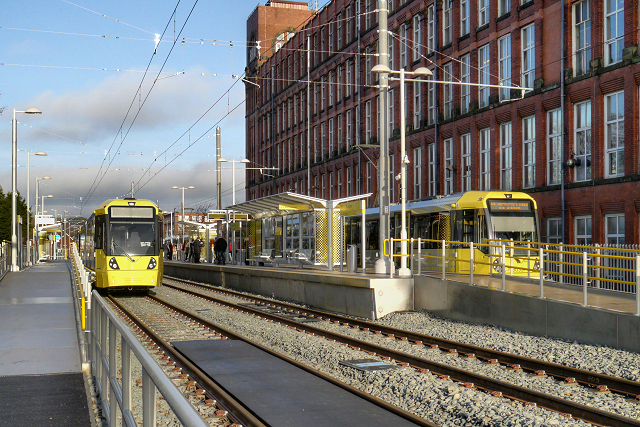
Shaw & Crompton tram stop, on its opening day

Public transport in Shaw and Crompton is co-ordinated by Transport for Greater Manchester. Shaw and Crompton had a railway line and station between 1863 and 2009, opened initially for haulage, but later used for passenger and commuter journeys. Shaw & Crompton railway station was used by passenger trains running between Rochdale and Manchester on the Oldham Loop Line. After initially being rejected in the early 2000s, plans to turn the line into part of the light-rail Metrolink system were accepted by the government on 6 July 2006. Shaw and Crompton railway station closed on 3 October 2009, so that it could be converted from use with heavy rail to Metrolink. Shaw & Crompton tram stop opened on 16 December 2012.

Historically the town was served by two electric tram routes operated by Oldham Corporation. The first ran from Higginshaw and opened on 15 November 1904 it was almost immediately extended to Chadderton Road, Oldham. The second line from Royton opened on 13 April 1905. By January 1921 both lines shared a terminus at Wrens Nest and the Royton line had been extended to Hollinwood. In the same year, the routes were assigned numbers; Hollinwood to Shaw route was No.8 and the route to Chadderton Road was No.9. There were plans to extend the lines to the railway station and High Crompton but these never materialised. Route 9 was closed on 11 June 1935 and route 8 was closed on 2 December 1939, both were replaced by buses.

The bus company First Greater Manchester provides frequent services to Oldham and Rochdale, with buses also running to Chadderton, Manchester, Royton and Stalybridge. Rosso runs the 435 between Buckstones and Rochdale. There is also two Shaw Circular routesrun by First, serving the smaller roads of Shaw and Crompton. Shaw and Crompton is located south of junction 21 of the M62 motorway.

== Education ==
There had been private cottage schools in the area from a very early time, but Crompton's first public school was founded in 1791. In 1838, the Shaw National School was built. The construction of church schools followed, including Shaw Methodist School in 1842, St Mary's, in 1847 and St James' 1851. Shaw and Crompton is now served by a variety of schools, including some with religious affiliations. All the schools in the town perform either at or above the national average for test results. Crompton House CE School, a secondary school for 11- to 16-year-olds, also has a sixth form college of further education for 16- to 18-year-olds on the same site.

School	Type/Status	Ofsted	Website
Beal Vale Primary School	Primary school	105672	website
Buckstones Primary School	Primary school	105671	website
Crompton House Church of England Academy	Secondary school	105740	website
Crompton Primary School	Primary school	133286	website
St George's CofE School	Primary school	105717	website
St James CofE School	Primary school	105710	website
Farrowdale House	Independent school	105747	website
Rushcroft Primary School	Primary school	105659	website
St Joseph's R.C. Primary	Primary school	105719	website
St Mary's CofE Primary School	Primary school	105711	website

== Religion ==
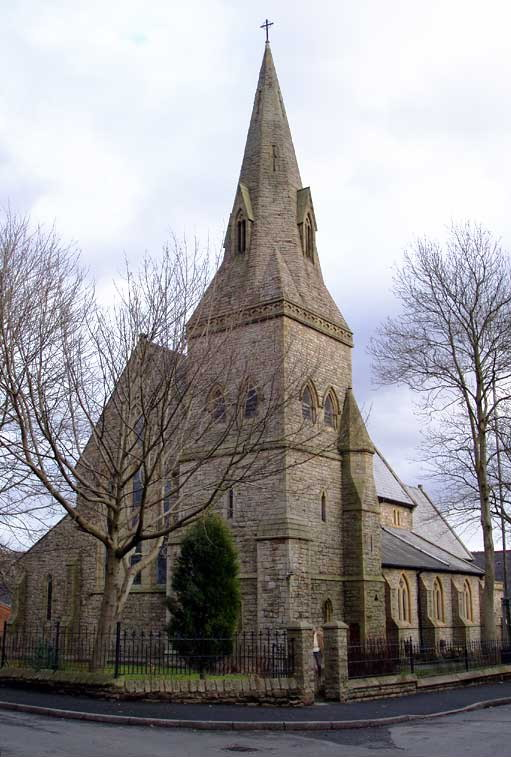
East Crompton, St James Church. Established 1847, this is one of Shaw and Crompton's parish churches, in the Diocese of Manchester.

The township of Crompton was originally within the parish of Prestwich-cum-Oldham in the Diocese of Lichfield, until 1541, when, owing to the English Reformation, this diocese was divided and Crompton became part of the Diocese of Chester. This in turn was divided in 1847, when the present Diocese of Manchester was created.

The exact date of the establishment of a place of worship in Crompton is uncertain. Although Shaw Chapel is certain to have been in existence since the early 16th century, it has been put that "Shaw Chapel is even more ancient than Oldham Old Church", as evidenced by the ancient toponymy of the area. Shaw Chapel was anciently known as St Patrick's Chapel-on-the-Moor, and during the reign of James I of England, "it was situate in the midst of the common called Shaw Moor, not a single habitation being near it". It is thought to have been constructed following an increase in wealth produced by the localisation of the woollen trade during a very bleak period, although, in 1552 it was noted that it had no endowment, and its ornaments were in poor condition. It was rebuilt in 1739 and enlarged in 1798, and rebuilt again in 1870. It is now known as the Church of Holy Trinity.

Shaw and Crompton has three Church of England ecclesiastic parishes: Shaw, High Crompton, and East Crompton. In addition to the established church, a variety of Reformed denominations, particularly Nonconformism and Methodism, have been practiced in Shaw and Crompton. Presbyterian ministers were recorded preaching at Shaw Chapel in as early as the 1650s. The Religious Society of Friends held conventicles in Whitfield in 1660s and 1670s.

The following is a table of churches presently in Shaw and Crompton, as of 2018.

Church	Denomination	Completed	Website
East Crompton, St James	Church of England	1847	www.ecsj.org.uk
East Crompton, St Saviours Crompton Fold	Church of England	1908	www.ecsj.org.uk
Hope Church	Christian Non-denominational	2018	www.hopechurchshaw.org.uk
Shaw, Holy Trinity	Church of England	1871	www.holytrinityshaw.co.uk
St Mary's High Crompton	Church of England	1872	http://www.holytrinityshaw.co.uk/
Shore Edge Methodist	Methodist	1873	https://www.shawroytonmethodist.org.uk/churches/circuit-churches/shore-edge.html
St Andrew's Methodist	Methodist	–	https://www.shawroytonmethodist.org.uk/churches/circuit-churches/st-andrews.html
St Paul's Shaw Methodist	Methodist	1863	www.stpaulsshaw.org.uk
Shaw United Reformed Church	Non-conformist	1885	Shaw & Heyside United Reformed Church
St Joseph Roman Catholic Church	Roman Catholic	1870	https://www.st-josephs.oldham.sch.uk/church
Salvation Army Church	Salvation Army	1896	https://www.salvationarmy.org.uk/

Most of the above churches participate in Shaw's annual Whit Walks event, when congregations, choirs, and brass bands parade through the streets from their respective churches before taking part in one large, communal, inter-church service. The town centre is also home to a small mosque.

== Community facilities ==
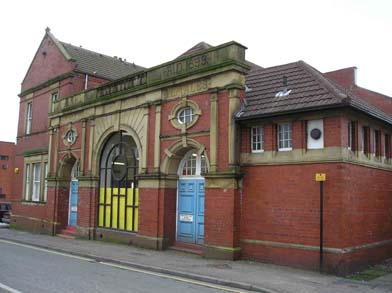
Crompton Pool, near the town centre, was a public swimming pool built in 1899, under the supervision of Crompton Urban District Council.

Shaw and Crompton has communal areas and public facilities, including public parks, sporting establishments, and playing fields. Public houses in the centre of the town include The Shay Wake (a mill town-themed J D Wetherspoon pub, named after the Shaw Wakes week), The Blue Bell, Coach and Horses, and The Pineapple. Outlying public houses include the Royal Oak at Cowlishaw, and the Park Inn at Buckstones Road.

Crompton Library is a purpose-built library housing over 36,000 items including books, CDs, and DVDs that can be borrowed by anyone who lives in the Oldham borough. It has communal Internet facilities. The library was built in the early 1990s after the original 1907 building, which exists now as apartments on Beal Lane, became too small.

There are three main public parks in Shaw and Crompton. Dunwood Park lies alongside the Oldham and Rochdale Metrolink Line and has a children's play area, bowling green, and over a mile of wooded pathways along the base of a forested hillside. The land that forms Dunwood Park was presented to Crompton Urban District Council by Captain Abram Crompton JP on 22 June 1911, and opened as a park by him on 14 September 1912. It was redeveloped with a new park and bowling green for its 2012 centenary after winning a £1 million grant from the National Lottery. High Crompton Park is in High Crompton and is home to a tennis court, bowling green, children's play area, and gardens. Jubilee Gardens are found in the centre of Shaw and Crompton town centre, behind the Crompton War Memorial. Shaw and Crompton has large areas of land reserved for sporting and communal events; these are located off George Street, Edward Road, and Rushcroft Road respectively.

Shaw Market is open retailers and customers every Thursday and is held on Market Street, which is closed to traffic for the event. Westway, the original location of the market, is now used for car parking but used for fun fairs and events. Crompton Pool was a swimming pool built in 1899 on Farrow Street in the town centre and served the community until its closure in July 2014 and subsequent demolition in February 2016. Crompton Cricket Club, is located on Glebe Street.

Playhouse 2 is a 156-seat theatre in the heart of Shaw and Crompton town centre, which used to be an Odeon cinema. It has been the home of the Crompton Stage Society, an amateur theatre company, since 1966. A wide variety of entertainment, professional as well as amateur, is produced each year.

== Public services ==
Home Office policing in Shaw and Crompton is provided by the Greater Manchester Police. The force's "(Q) Division" have their headquarters for policing the Metropolitan Borough of Oldham at central Oldham, which is now the nearest police station. Public transport is co-ordinated by Transport for Greater Manchester. Statutory emergency fire and rescue service is provided by the Greater Manchester Fire and Rescue Service.

There are no hospitals in Shaw and Crompton—the nearest are in the larger settlements of Oldham and Rochdale—but some local health care is provided by Crompton Health Centre which is Shaw and Crompton's NHS surgery. It has been subject to a development scheme intended to improve NHS facilities in the town. The North West Ambulance Service provides emergency patient transport in the area. Other forms of health care are provided for locally by several small specialist clinics and surgeries.

Waste management is co-ordinated by the local authority via the Greater Manchester Waste Disposal Authority. Locally produced inert waste for disposal is sent to landfill at the Beal Valley. Shaw and Crompton's distribution network operator for electricity is United Utilities; there are no power stations in the town. United Utilities also manages Shaw and Crompton's drinking and waste water; water supplies are sourced from several local reservoirs, including Dovestones and Chew.

== Notable people ==
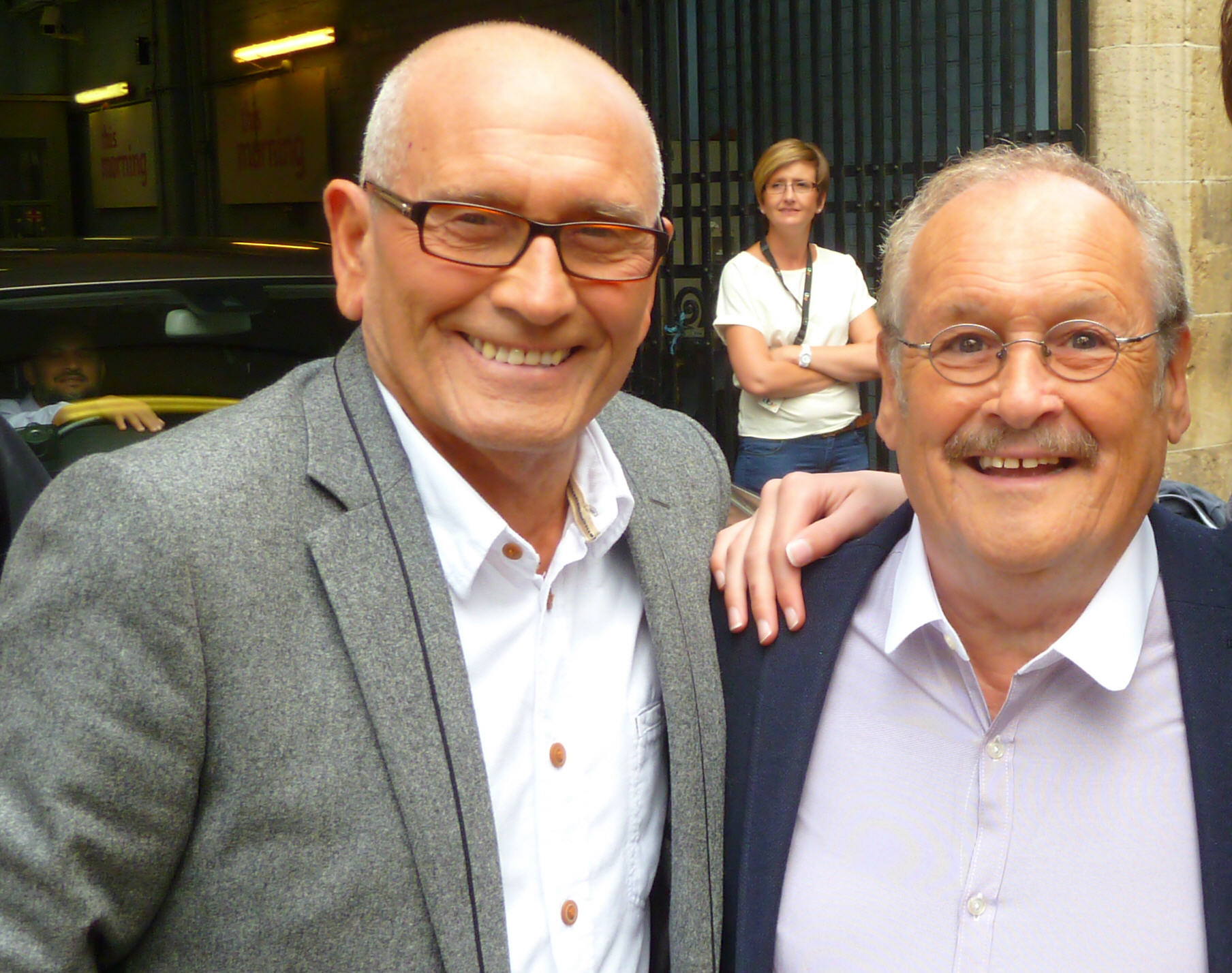
Cannon and Ball, 2013

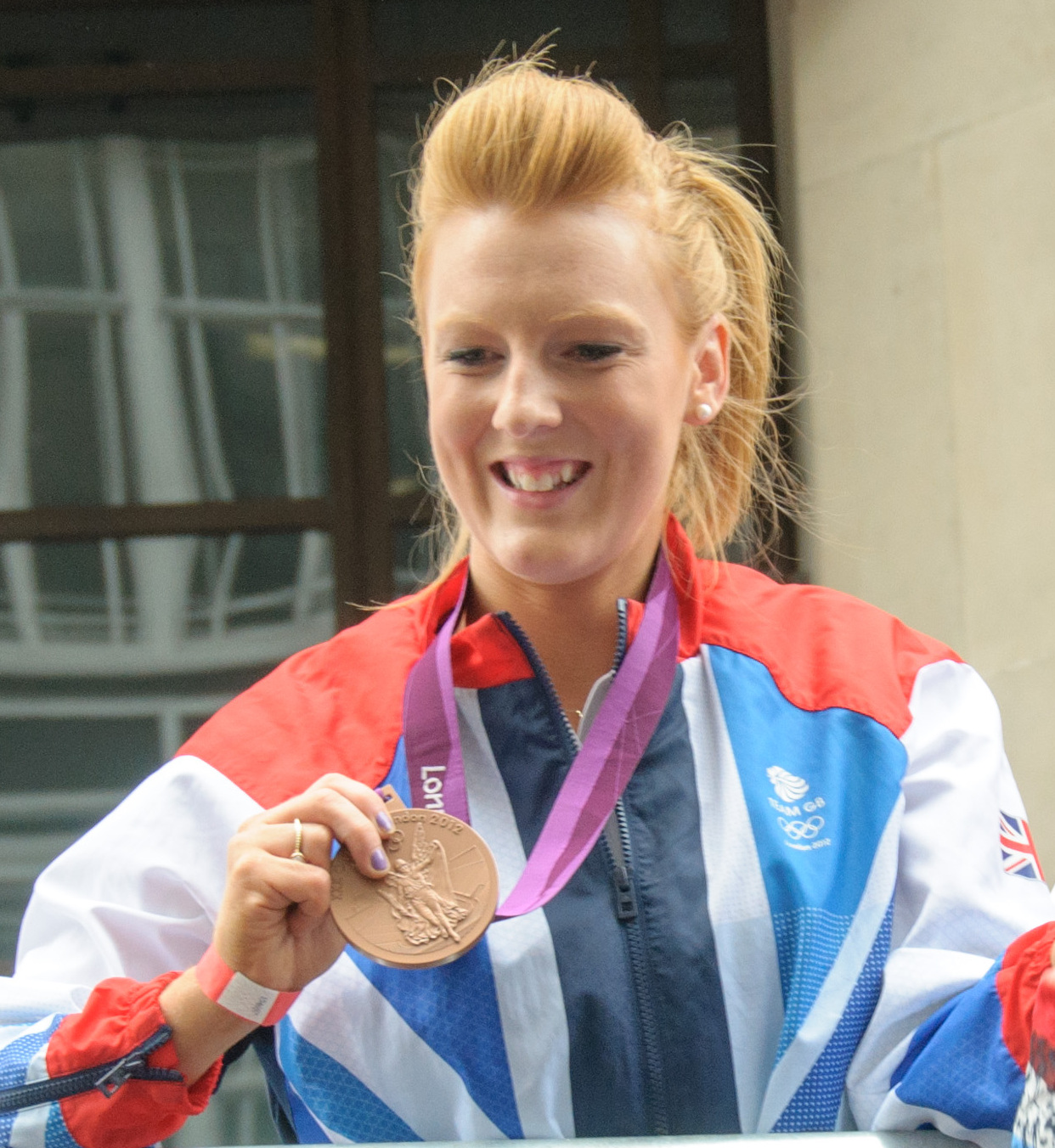
Nicola White, 2012

- Philip Gilbert Hamerton (1834–1894), an acclaimed etcher, painter and art critic.
- Cannon and Ball were a double act comprising Tommy Cannon (born 1938), and Bobby Ball (1944– 2020); they lived locally.
- Shobna Gulati (born 1966), actress and presenter, played Sunita Alahan in Coronation Street from 2001/2013.
- N-Trance (founded 1990) is an electronic music group, cofounded locally by Kevin O'Toole.

=== Sport ===
Darren "Stubby" Stubbs (born 1971) is a former professional light-heavyweight boxer and community figure from Shaw. During his professional career (2002–2011), he held the UK and International Masters titles and reached the final of the Sky Sports Prizefighter tournament in 2009, which was broadcast nationally. Following his retirement from the ring, Stubbs established Stubby's ABC, a boxing gym in Shaw. The gym is recognized for its community impact, particularly for its inclusive programs that support young people with additional needs, including those with cerebral palsy and anxiety. In 2024 and 2025, the gym was highlighted in local media for its "open door" policy and its role as a vital social hub for the district.

- Jack Rowley (1918–1998), footballer who played 358 games including 380 for Manchester United and 6 for England
- Paul Edwards (born 1947), footballer, played over 230 games, including 110 for Oldham Athletic
- Mark Hilditch (born 1960), footballer who played over 360 games including 197 for Rochdale
- Andy Ritchie (born 1960), football player and manager; played 661 games including 250 for Oldham Athletic
- Nicola White (born 1988), a field hockey player, and gold medalist in women's field hockey at the 2016 Summer Olympics.
- Marc Sneyd (born 1991), rugby league footballer who played 322 games including 175 with Hull, he grew up locally.

NB

People from Shaw and Crompton are called Gawbies or Cromptonians.
