= 2012 Oldham explosion =

Explosion in Oldham, England

Coordinates: 53.58021°N 2.09090°W

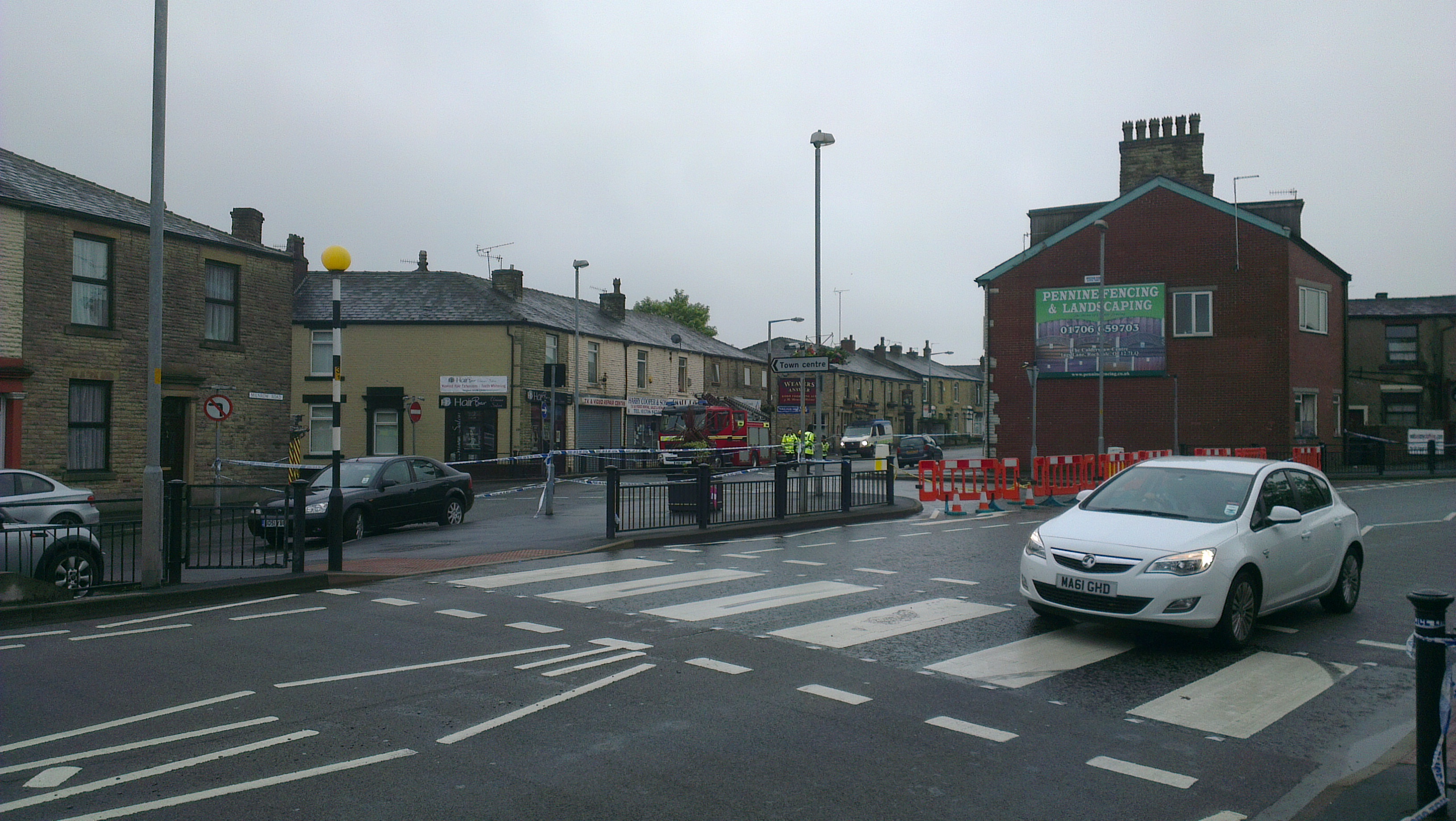
Milnrow Road, 27 June 2012

The 2012 Oldham explosion occurred on 26 June 2012. A house on Buckley Street in Shaw, a town in the Metropolitan Borough of Oldham, England, exploded at 10:40am. Twelve neighbouring homes were destroyed in the blast amounting to £1.2 million of damage. 175 homes were evacuated. Thirty firefighters were at the site of the blast. A two-year-old boy was killed and one man injured. A gas leak was reported before the explosion. The two-year-old was later named as Jamie Heaton and the man as Jamie's neighbour; 27-year-old Andrew Partington.

== Investigation ==
Initially, the explosion was thought to have been related to a gas leak, particularly as a smell of gas was reported in the area the previous day. However, on the day of the explosion, Greater Manchester Police released a statement confirming the explosion was being treated as suspicious. The day after the explosion, National Grid confirmed there was no gas leak at the site of the explosion.

=== Gas worker ===
On 27 June 2012, the day after the explosion, a 32-year-old man was arrested on suspicion of manslaughter. The man was later reported to be a boiler worker and had examined a boiler at Partington's house.

On 29 June 2012, the man was released on bail until 9 August 2012, pending further investigations.

On 10 September 2012, Greater Manchester Police confirmed the man was still on bail.

On 12 September 2012, following Partington (another suspect) appearing at court, the boiler worker was eliminated from police enquiries and released without charge.

=== Andrew Partington ===
On 27 June 2012, Partington was arrested whilst in hospital, in connection with the explosion. However, police were unable to immediately question him.

On 10 September 2012, Partington was charged with manslaughter and criminal damage.

On 12 September 2012, Partington was refused bail after appearing at Manchester Crown Court by video link. On 28 November 2012, Partington appeared via video link in court and pleaded guilty to causing the death of Heaton along with eight charges of destroying neighbouring houses after allowing his home to fill with gas.

On 13 February 2013, Partington was prosecuted for manslaughter and eight charges of destroying properties. He was sentenced to 10 years imprisonment and five years on licence following his release.
