= Crompton Hall =

Historic house in Crompton, Lancashire, England

Coordinates: 53°35′9″N 2°4′45″W

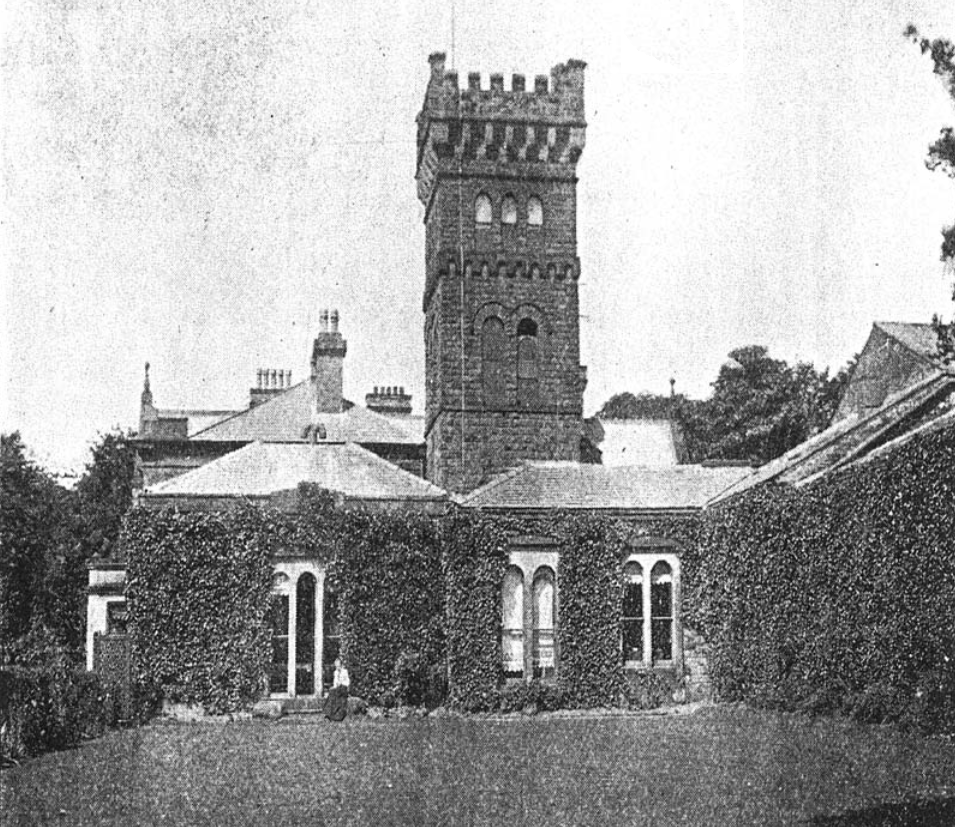
Crompton Hall, as rebuilt in the 1860s and demolished 1950s

Crompton Hall was an historic house situated at Crompton Fold in the township of Crompton, Lancashire, and within the historic parish of Prestwich-cum-Oldham.

Crompton Hall was in the township for hundreds of years. The hall has two known stages, the first being a medieval one, of which the manor existed at least as early as 1442 to provide for Norman conquest settlers, the second was a 19th-century phase, built in c.1848 with much more splendour, and reflected the Crompton's increased affluence much due to the Industrial Revolution which took place in the town. Crompton Hall was demolished in 1952, but much of its forested gardens still remain today. The location of the demolished house, by then within the suburbs of Greater Manchester, was "Buckstones Road, Shaw, Greater Manchester".

== History ==
Arms of the mediaeval Crompton family of Crompton: Gules, a fess wavy between three lions rampant or

The Crompton family has a well documented history. Crompton first appears as a family name when the De La Legh family (settlers from the Norman Conquest) changed their name to indicate the Anglo-Saxon township they had obtained and settled in during the 13th century.

The family were prosperous landowners of the area, from their initial medieval acquisition, through to the early 20th century.

The Crompton family owned a large house by the name of Crompton Hall which first appears in historical records as early as 1442 and owned by Thomas de Crompton and his family.

Sir Winston Churchill once stayed at Crompton Hall and he had written letters describing how peaceful and tranquil the area was.

=== Demolition ===
The original medieval Crompton Hall was demolished c.1848. A second and apparently 'magnificent' Crompton Hall, set in its own prominent forested grounds, was erected by the family, but following the dissipation and eventual death of the last remaining family members, the site was sold off and the manor was demolished in 1952 to make way for an exclusive development of bungalows.

Whilst the local council attempted to buy the Grade II listed building and contents for means of preserving civic heritage, the building was not sold to them, and was somewhat hastily destroyed with the contents of the home sold off at auction to the highest bidder.

== Post-demolition ==
Some of the original forested grounds of Crompton Hall can still be found in the Buckstones area of Crompton today, and is a small but popular public woods. The woodland (of which many of the horse chestnut, oak, and maple trees are currently protected by a tree preservation order) are home to a number of animal species, including owls, foxes, bats, wood pigeons, hedgehogs and grey squirrels.

The site of Crompton Hall is now one of controversy, as part of the public woods is undergoing a process of planning permission to build a number of proposed three story luxury flats. This has been met with considerable protest due to the nature of the buildings and the requirement of many trees to be felled. The "Crompton Hall Action Group" was set up by local communities to halt any building work of this kind. Though two attempts at halting development permissions in the location failed, a revised project was proposed due to credit crunch, featuring less houses, of smaller size, with the Group commenting that the new application was an improvement, though they still opposed it. Councillors of the Action Group said they were “between the devil and the deep blue sea”, as disputing the project again could bring back the initial project. The applicants, on the other hand, promised measures to safeguard protected species such as bats.
