= Crompton Urban District =

Local government area in the UK, abolished 1974

Coordinates: 53°35′N 2°07′W

- Area
  - 1894: 2,865 acres (11.6 km²)
  - 1974: 2,865 acres (11.6 km²)
- Population
  - 1911: 14,750
  - 1971: 17,026
- History
  - Created: 1894
  - Abolished: 1974
  - Succeeded by: Metropolitan Borough of Oldham
- Status: Urban district
  - HQ: Crompton Town Hall

Crompton Urban District was, from 1894 to 1974, a local government district in the administrative county of Lancashire, England. The area was coterminate with Shaw and Crompton.

It covered a significant area to the north of the County Borough of Oldham, and formed part of the Oldham parliamentary constituency (abolished in 1950).

The Urban District was created by the Local Government Act 1894. In 1974 Crompton Urban District was abolished by the Local Government Act 1972 and its former area transferred to Greater Manchester to form part of the Metropolitan Borough of Oldham.

== Coat of arms ==
Unlike nearby districts such as Chadderton Urban District and Failsworth Urban District, the council for Crompton Urban District was never granted the right to bear a coat of arms by the College of Arms.

However, the district council often used the arms of the Lancashire County Council with an icon of a spinning wheel beneath it (as reference to the district's Lancastrian mill town heritage).
