= Shaw (woodland) =

A shaw is a strip of woodland usually between 5 and 15 metres (15 and 50 feet) wide. Shaws commonly form boundaries between fields or line a road.

They are usually composed of natural woodland (rather than being a planted avenue) and often have diverse woodland ground vegetation similar to other natural woodlands in the area. They should not be confused with hedges, even when these are made of mature trees.

Like other woodland, shaws may be managed as high forest or as coppice.

In some areas, such as the Weald of south-eastern England, shaws may be the remnants of larger woods out of which fields were cleared many centuries ago, or they may have developed from narrower hedgerows which have become unmanaged. Place names using this form include Roundshaw and Dunnockshaw.
