= Shaw National Distribution Centre =

Distribution centre in Greater Manchester, England

Coordinates: 53°34′49″N 2°5′7″W

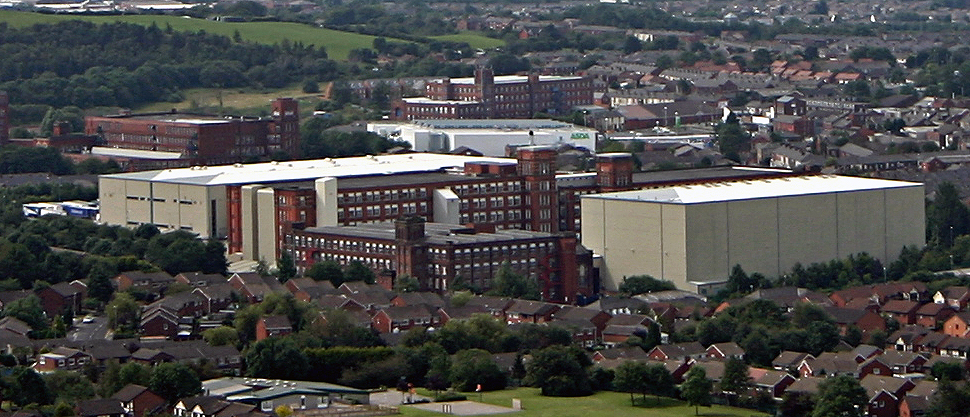
Shaw National Distribution Centre from Crompton Moor.

Shaw National Distribution Centre (also known as Shaw NDC) was a warehouse distribution centre located in Shaw and Crompton, a town in Greater Manchester, England. It was the main distribution and order processing centre for British retailer The Very Group who used it to store "over 1,000,000 sq ft (93,000 m^{2}) of products", ready for delivery through their distribution arm, Business Express, which later became Home Delivery Network after the merger of Business Express and Reality. In 2011, Home Delivery Network was rebranded as Yodel. Shaw NDC spanned 23 acres (9.3 ha), making it one of Europe's largest warehouse distribution centres during its lifetime.

After The Very Group relocated in 2021 to a new purpose-built facility in the East Midlands, four of the buildings on the site, including three cotton mills, have since been demolished to make way for future plans of housing.

The remaining purpose-built delivery sortation facility - built in 1999 - was previously occupied by delivery company Yodel until its closure in July 2024 as their Northern hub in the national network, alongside the Southern hub at Hatfield and Midlands hub at Wednesbury.

== History ==
Shaw National Distribution Centre opened for business as a warehousing and returns centre for Littlewoods in 1979. It occupied three converted former cotton mills and two purpose-built stock-handling and sortation facilities. It dominated the skyline of Shaw and Crompton, and was the Metropolitan Borough of Oldham's largest private employer. In 2006 it distributed around 18 million items to customers, and in 2007 processed more than 39 million customer orders. In early 2009 the peak number of staff at the site was reported to be 1,250 people.

=== Origins to 1977 ===
Shaw and Crompton developed as an important mill town, and the Shaw National Distribution Centre traces its origins to a cluster of cotton mills in the central part of the town—Lily, Lily (No. 2), Newby, Rutland, Ash and Dee. Rutland Mill was built in 1907, taken over by the Lancashire Cotton Corporation in 1930s and absorbed into the Courtaulds group in 1964. It closed for business in 1966. The Lily mills were designed by G. Stott, and built in 1904 and 1917 respectively. They were both cotton mills until they were purchased in the 1950s by Cyril Lord. They were taken over by Carrington Viyella in around 1970, but closed for business in 1977 when they were purchased by Littlewoods and converted into an "ultra-modern mail-order warehouse".

=== 1979 to 1997 ===
After major structural changes, the site became operational as a mail order processing centre in 1979. The interiors of the cotton mills were stripped of their cotton-spinning machinery, whilst externally, chimneys were felled and reservoirs were removed. Other changes included a series of bridges to link the mills.

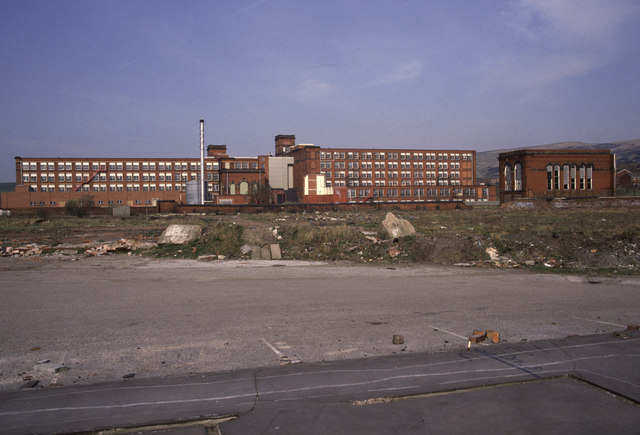
The west side of Shaw NDC, in 1990, before the construction of a purpose-built packing and sortation facility (on the wasteland).

Meanwhile, the Dee" and "Ash mills were demolished with intention of using the land to further expand the complex. This however was prevented by the fact the Dee mill's engine house was protected by English Heritage and so for the following 10 years, it stood in the middle of wasteland. In the 1990s permission was granted to demolish the neglected engine house and work began on building the extension to the distribution centre. This included a project to reroute the River Beal from the centre of the land, to follow a path around the perimeter of the proposed building instead. The new building, which includes packing, sorting and distribution facilities complete with a large trailer yard, opened in 1997 and was put into full use in 2001.

At around the same time Littlewoods acquired the Lily mills, it purchased the adjacent Rutland Mill with the intention of continuing a bridge connection from the other mills and converting it into an automated storage facility. However, it was decided this would cost more money than simply replacing the mill with a purpose made building. Nearby residents were informed of the demolition of Rutland mill and its replacement with a new 'one storey' warehouse, which was duly approved. Demolition took place in 1993. In reality the new building, which opened in 1997, although is technically 'one storey', it is almost as tall as its predecessor. The local authority and residents were displeased and have since revamped planning permission criteria for the area.

Shaw NDC began a partnership with Dutch robotics company Vanderlande in 1984.

=== 1997 to 2022 ===
The continued development of the site has brought some criticism from local residents. New buildings - described as "windowless cubes" - are largely considered eyesores, have been accused of interfering with television reception due to their size and metallic structure. The increased work at the site has brought more and more heavy goods vehicles, which now operate heavily during the night. Trailer shunters also operate at night and the company have been approached several times by officials to be told to keep the noise down. In Autumn 2006, Muslim staff at the warehouse contacted local media and claimed they had been forced to resort to hiding and eating in the stock-storage aisles during Ramadan, as they were not granted allowance for breaking their fasts. Unions however counter-claimed this was in line with policy, legislation and business needs.

Gordon Brown, then Chancellor of the Exchequer, visited Shaw NDC in 2005.

In 2006, the site won the award for "Business Excellence in the North of England" for private sector firms with more than 250 staff.

In May 2006 it was announced that Shaw NDC was to become The Very Group's only packing and distribution centre for non-bulk items, employing nearly 1,000 staff; strengthening Very's position as the Metropolitan Borough of Oldham's largest private employer. In early 2009 the peak number of staff at the site was reported to be 1,250 people.

== Specifications ==
Specifications
Name	Shaw National Distribution Centre
Area	23 acres (9.3 ha)
Opened for business	1979
Employees	800-1,500
Trade Union	USDAW

Shaw NDC was the premier warehousing and returns facility for The Very Group, spanning 23 acres (93,000 m^{2}). It had between 850 and 1,500 employees. Around 60 per cent are women and 25 per cent are from ethnic minorities. Almost the entire workforce are members of the trade union USDAW.

Shaw NDC stored over 1,000,000 sq ft (93,000 m^{2}) of products, and is made up of five buildings; three of which are converted cotton mills, built in the late 19th and early 20th centuries, and two state-of-the-art purpose built buildings added in the mid 1990s. The first, seen from Linney Lane, is a £61million automated Bulk-Carton Storage facility. The second, which is accessed from Beal Lane, is home to a packing hall and a distribution centre. The site is one of Europe's largest warehouse distribution centres.

The centre was the biggest private employer in the Metropolitan Borough of Oldham. with staff employed either through Very themselves or through the Blue Arrow work agency. The site is a recognised by the British Quality Foundation as an "Investor in Excellence".

Sodexo provided canteen services.

== Notes ==
=== Bibliography ===
- Farnie, D. A.; Tetsuro, Nakaoka; Takeshi, Abe (2000). Region and Strategy in Britain and Japan: Business in Lancashire and Kansai, 1890–1990. Routledge. ISBN 978-0-415-20317-3.
- Gurr, Duncan; Hunt, Julian (1998). The Cotton Mills of Oldham. Oldham Education & Leisure. ISBN 0-902809-46-6.
- Hunt, Julian; Stott, Frances (1988). Looking Back at Crompton. Oldham Education & Leisure. ISBN 0-902809-17-2.
