= Listed buildings in Todmorden (outer areas) =

Todmorden is a market town and civil parish in the metropolitan borough of Calderdale, West Yorkshire, England. It contains over 300 listed buildings that are recorded in the National Heritage List for England. Of these, two are listed at Grade I, the highest of the three grades, eleven are at Grade II*, the middle grade, and the others are at Grade II, the lowest grade. This list contains the listed buildings in the more outlying areas of the parish, namely those along Rochdale Road to the south of its junction with Bacup Road, including the settlement of Walsden and Warland, along Bacup Road, including Clough Foot, and the surrounding outlying rural and moorland areas, including the settlements of Mankinholes and Lumbutts. The listed buildings in the inner area are in Listed buildings in Todmorden (inner area).

A high proportion of the listed buildings in these areas are farmhouses, farm buildings, houses and cottages, and laithe houses. The Rochdale Canal runs through the areas, and the listed buildings associated with it are bridges and locks. The other listed buildings include an inscribed stone and a standing stone, milestones and boundary stones, a former packhorse bridge, a grindstone and grindstone circle, a water trough, a monument, a road bridge, a former toll house, a former watermill, a church, a chapel and a church tower, a water tower, a former textile mill, and a school.

== Key ==
Grade	Criteria
I	Buildings of exceptional interest, sometimes considered to be internationally important
II*	Particularly important buildings of more than special interest
II	Buildings of national importance and special interest

== Buildings ==
Name and location	Photograph	Date	Notes	Grade
Hill House; 53.72063°N 2.07148°W	—	16th century	The house has a cruck framed core, it was encased in stone in the 17th century, and a cross-wing was added in the 19th century. The original hall range has one storey and an outshut on the front, and the gabled wing to the left has two storeys. Most of the windows are mullioned, and inside the house is a complete cruck truss.	II
The Cottage east of Inchfield House; 53.69378°N 2.10178°W	—	Mid 16th century	The house was extended in the 18th century. The original part is cruck framed with stone walls, and it has one storey and an attic and four bays. The extension has two storeys and one bay, and both parts have stone slate roofs. The original part has varied windows, and on its gable is a crocketed finial. The extension has a mullioned window and an open porch. Inside the original part are four pairs of crucks.	II
Middle Longfield Farmhouse and barn 53.70872°N 2.09233°W	—	16th century (possible)	The oldest part is the barn, the farmhouse dating from the mid-17th century and the porch added in 1700. The buildings are in stone with stone slate roofs. The farmhouse has two storeys, three bays, and a kitchen range at right angles. The windows have chamfered mullions. On the front is a porch on a plinth, with a coped gable and kneelers, and a doorway with a Tudor arch, sunken spandrels, and a moulded surround, and above it is an inscribed and dated tablet. The barn has double aisles, and four bays, and contains a semicircular cart entry and doorways.	II
Croft Farmhouse and barn 53.70742°N 2.07769°W	—	Late 16th century (probable}	The barn dates from the 17th century, and there have been further additions. The building is in stone, the roof of the house is in stone slate, and the roof of the barn is slated; both have coped gables. The house has one storey and an attic, three bays, and a rear outshut. The doorway has monolithic jambs, and the windows have been altered. The barn has three bays, and contains a single aisle and a cart entry.	II
Mankinholes Hall; 53.70850°N 2.06203°W	—	Late 16th century	A house, later extended and used as a youth hostel, it is in stone and has a stone slate roof with coped gablea and kneelers, and each has a crocketed finial with a carved ball. On the front are four bays, and the gable end facing the road has chamfered mullioned windows, those in the ground floor with arched lights, sunken spandrels, and a continuous stepped hood mould.	II
Old Farmhouse and Old Farm Cottage; 53.70908°N 2.06210°W		Late 16th century	A house, later two dwellings, it is in stone and has a stone slate roof with coped gables and carved balls in the apices. There are two storeys, three bays, and a rear outshut. On the front is a gabled porch with two doorways. The windows have chamfered mullions, some with hood moulds.	II
Pilkington Farmhouse; 53.70905°N 2.06260°W	—	Late 16th century	The house is in stone and has a stone slate roof with coped gables and moulding kneelers. There are two storeys, three bays and a rear kitchen wing. The windows have chamfered mullions, and some have hood moulds. The doorway has monolithic jambs, a lintel, and a moulded cornice.	II
Lee Farmhouse; 53.70539°N 2.06743°W		1584	The former farmhouse, later two dwellings, is in stone and has a stone slate roof. There are two storeys, a three bay hall range, and a gabled cross-wing on the right. Most of the windows have chamfered mullions, those in the ground floor with hood moulds. On the front is a gabled porch and a doorway with a dated lintel.	II
Croft Gate and Croft Gate East; 53.70639°N 2.07785°W	—	1598	The house was extended to the eats in the 18th century and again in the 20th century. It is in stone and has a stone slate roof with coped gables. There are two storeys, the main block has three bays, and the 20th century extension is lower with two bays. Most of the windows have chamfered mullions, and the main doorway has a chamfered surround and a dated lintel.	II
Lower Ashes Farmhouse and gate piers 53.72426°N 2.07818°W		1610	The farmhouse, which was altered in 1759, is in stone, and has a stone slate roof with coped gables, kneelers, and ball finials. There are two storeys, a double-depth plan, and five bays. The doorway on the front has chamfered jambs, and a dated lintel. At the rear is a doorway with a moulded surround, and above it is an inscribed and dated tablet. The windows have chamfered mullions. Attached to the house is a stone wall containing gate piers, each with rusticated quoins, an entablature, a moulded cornice, and a ball finial.	II*
Lower East Lee and attached barn 53.72555°N 2.06187°W	—	1610	The porch was added in about 1631, and the barn was attached to the right in the 19th century. The buildings are in stone with stone slate roofs. The house has two storeys, four uneven bays, and a two-storey gabled porch. The porch has a moulded surround, and an ogee lintel, above which is an inscribed dated stone. The gable is coped with kneelers, it contains a dovecote, and on the apex is a crocketed finial. The windows have chamfered mullions. The barn has a semicircular cart entry with a Venetian window above, a mullioned window and a doorway.	II*
Fold; 53.73158°N 2.06423°W	—	Early 17th century	A long range consisting of a house, and to the right an 18th-century barn and cottage, all in stone with stone slate roofs. The house has two storeys, three bays, and a projecting cross-wing. The doorway has a moulded surround, composite jambs, and a square-headed lintel, and the windows have chamfered mullions, some with hood moulds. The barn has a segmental-headed cart entry with huge jambs and a Venetian window above, and the other windows are mullioned. On the right is a single-storey outbuilding with quoins.	II
Great House; 53.72842°N 2.07021°W	—	Early 17th century	The hall range of the house was extended later in the 17th century with the addition of an east cross-wing and a rear kitchen wing. The house is in stone on a plinth, and has a stone slate roof with coped gables and kneelers. There are two storeys, and the windows have chamfered mullions with moulded hood moulds.	II
House northwest of Friths Farmhouse; 53.70676°N 2.11481°W	—	Early 17th century	The house was extended in the 19th century. It is in stone with quoins and a stone slate roof. There is one storey and an attic and three bays. The doorway has a heavy lintel and above it is a pitching hole. The windows have chamfered mullions.	II
Hartley Royd Farmhouse; 53.73586°N 2.12452°W		Early 17th century	The farmhouse was extended to the west in the 19th century. It is in stone on a plinth, with a stone slate roof and has two storeys. The original part has three bays, and all the windows have chamfered mullions. There is a continuous hood mould over the ground floor windows. In the lean-to of the extension is a doorway, and the original doorway, which has been converted into a window, has a moulded surround, a depressed Tudor arched lintel, and sunken spandrels, and above is an inscribed and dated tablet.	II
Barn east of Lower Winsley Farmhouse; 53.73114°N 2.08425°W	—	Early 17th century	The barn is in stone, and has a stone slate roof with coped gables and kneelers. There are three bays and a half-aisle. The barn contains a cart entry and a doorway, both with heavy lintels, composite jambs, and chamfered surrounds.	II
Oldroyd Farmhouse; 53.71309°N 2.07894°W	—	Early 17th century	The house is in stone with a stone slate roof, and has two storeys, three bays, and a single-storey bay to the left. In the first bay is a doorway with a chamfered surround and a Tudor arched lintel. The second and third bays project forward and have coped gables. The windows are mullioned.	II
Upper East Lee; 53.72736°N 2.06070°W	—	Early 17th century	A stone house that has a stone slate roof with coped gables and kneelers. There are two storeys at the front, one at the rear, two bays, and an aisle under a catslide roof at the rear. In the left return is a gabled porch, and the windows have mullions, mainly double chamfered.	II
Higher Eastwood; 53.72898°N 2.05910°W	—	1630	A house, later divided, it is in stone on a plinth, with a slate roof. There are two storeys and four bays. Two doorways have monolithic jambs, and there is an inserted doorway with a chamfered surround and a straight lintel. Above the door is an inscribed tablet, the windows have chamfered mullions, and above the ground floor windows is a continuous hood mould.	II
Inchfield Fold Farmhouse; 53.69339°N 2.10301°W	—	1631	The farmhouse is in stone on a plinth, with quoins and a stone slate roof. There are two storeys, a double-depth plan, and attached are two recessed bays. The windows are mullioned, some with hood moulds, and the doorway has a chamfered surround, composite jambs, and an inscribed arched lintel. In the recessed bays is a doorway with monolithic jambs.	II
Lower Winsley Farmhouse; 53.73122°N 2.08448°W	—	1636	The farmhouse is in stone with quoins and a stone slate roof with coped gables and kneelers. There are two storeys and three bays. On the right end is a lean-to porch, and most of the windows have chamfered mullions.	II
Bean Hole Head Farmhouse and barn 53.72107°N 2.07706°W	—	1638	The farmhouse was later extended, and the barn was added in the 18th century. It is in stone and has a stone slate roof with coped gables with kneelers and ball finials. There are two storeys and a doorway with a moulded cornice. The windows have chamfered mullions. Inside the farmhouse is excellent plaster work.	II*
Barn west of Upper East Lee; 53.72734°N 2.06104°W	—	Mid 17th century	The barn is in stone with a stone slate roof, and has a single aisle that projects with a quoined angle, and a cart entry with a square lintel. The east front has a doorway with a quoined lintel, and a square-headed cart entry. To the north is a single-bay cottage that has a doorway with monolithic jambs and a chamfered surround, and windows with chamfered mullions.	II
Cottage northeast of Hartley Royd Farmhouse; 53.73598°N 2.12438°W	—	17th century	The cottage is in stone with quoins, and has a stone slate roof with coped gables on kneelers. There are two storeys, and on the east front are windows with chamfered mullions.	II
Greenhurst Hey Old Farmhouse; 53.72824°N 2.09350°W	—	Mid 17th century	The farmhouse was extended to the rear in the 19th century. It is in stone and has a roof of slate at the front, stone slate at the rear, and stone ridge tiles. There are two storeys and a rear wing. The doorway has monolithic jambs, a chamfered surround, and a depressed Tudor arched lintel. In the upper floor the windows have chamfered mullions, the ground floor contains a sash window, and the other windows are modern replacements.	II
Barn west of Hill House; 53.72061°N 2.07177°W	—	17th century (possible)	The barn is in stone with a stone slate roof. It contains a doorway with a chamfered surround and a segmental-arched lintel, and square-headed cart entries. On the south gable end are vents with inscribed spandrels, and an inscribed stone tablet with a scrolled surround.	II
Lower Longfield Farmhouse; 53.70849°N 2.09301°W	—	Mid 17th century	A stone house that has a stone slate roof with coped gables and kneelers. There are two storeys, and a T-shaped plan, with a front range of three bays and a rear kitchen wing. On the front is a two-storey gabled porch on a plinth, the upper storey jettied, containing a doorway with a chamfered surround. The windows have chamfered mullions and modern glazing.	II
Middle Bottomley; 53.68650°N 2.08888°W	—	Mid 17th century	A house with an attached barn dated 1784. The house has chamfered mullioned windows, and in the barn is a semicircular arched entry with a dated and initialled datestone.	II
Barn north of Rodwell End Farmhouse; 53.72199°N 2.06544°W	—	Mid 17th century	A stone barn with quoins, a stone slate roof, and three bays. In the north front is a cart entry with a straight lintel, and a doorway with a quoined lintel, both with chamfered surrounds. In the left gable end is a doorway and vents, above which are pitching holes, and an owl hole in the apex. In the south front is a semicircular-headed cart entry, a mullioned window and a doorway.	II
Dovecote to south of Swallowshaw; 53.72719°N 2.07678°W	—	Mid 17th century	The dovecote is in stone, and has a slate roof with coped gables and shaped kneelers. There are two storeys, on the front is a doorway with a square lintel in both storeys, and at the rear are chamfered mullioned windows.	II
Swineshead and Swineshead Cottage; 53.70526°N 2.09870°W	—	Mid 17th century	The house was rebuilt in the 18th century, and it has been divided into two dwellings. It is in stone, and has two storeys and an attic, and three bays. The round-headed doorway has monolithic jambs, imposts, and a moulded hood on consoles. Above the doorway is a sash window, most of the other windows have double chamfered mullions, and at the rear is a tall stair window.	II
Upper Shaw; 53.71412°N 2.06149°W		Mid 17th century	The house is in stone with a stone slate roof, and has two storeys, four bays, and a rear kitchen wing. The doorway has a chamfered surround, to the right of the door is a circular window, the other windows have chamfered mullions, and there is a continuous hood mould above the ground floor windows.	II*
Warland Farm and Cottage; 53.67914°N 2.08404°W	—	Mid 17th century	The house, which has been extended and divided into two, is in stone with quoins and a stone slate roof. There are two storeys and five bays. Most of the windows have chamfered mullions, and on the front is a bay window.	II
Swallowshaw and barn 53.72733°N 2.07674°W		1663	The house and barn are in stone with stone slate roofs that have coped gables with kneelers. The house has two storeys, a double-pile plan, two bays, and a rear outshut. The doorway has a moulded surround and a dated Tudor arched lintel, and the windows have chamfered mullions. The attached aisled barn projects forward, and has quoins, and contains doorways, cart entries, and windows.	II*
Lower Birks; 53.73040°N 2.06550°W	—	1664	A house in stone on a plinth that has a stone slate roof with coped gables and kneelers. There are two storeys, a double-depth plan, two bays, and a single-storey wing on the left. The doorway has a moulded surround and a semicircular-arched head, and the windows have chamfered mullions, those in the ground floor with a continuous hood mould. On the front is a recessed inscribed and dated tablet.	II
Strait Hey Farmhouse and barn 53.72083°N 2.03959°W	—	1670	The barn was added to the house in the 19th century. The building is in stone with a stone slate roof. The house has two storeys and two bays. On the front is a lean-to porch and a doorway with chamfered jambs and an inscribed lintel, and the windows are mullioned. The barn has quoins, a coped gable, a doorway, and a semicircular-arched cart entry.	II
Lane Top Farmhouse; 53.73130°N 2.06953°W	—	1672 (possible)	The farmhouse was rebuilt, possibly in the 18th century, and it is in stone with quoins, and a stone slate roof that has coped gables with kneelers and ball finials. There are two storeys and three bays. On the front is a gabled porch, and a doorway with a chamfered surround and a square lintel. To its right are square windows with chamfered jambs, and elsewhere are mullioned windows.	II
The Shaw West; 53.71398°N 2.06097°W	—	1675	A stone house on a plinth, with a string course, and a stone slate roof that has coped gables with kneelers and ball finials. There are two storeys, three bays, and a rear aisle and kitchen wing. The doorway has a chamfered surround with sash windows above, and the other windows have double chamfered mullions.	II
Cross Gap; 53.72215°N 2.07536°W	—	Late 17th century	A house with a barn added on the left in the 19th century. The buildings are in stone with stone slate roofs. The house has coped gables with kneelers and a ball finial. There are two storeys, a doorway with a chamfered surround, and windows with chamfered mullions. The barn has a segmental-arched cart entry, a re-set datestone, and a doorway with a chamfered surround.	II
Barn, Deanroyd Farmhouse; 53.68687°N 2.09247°W	—	Late 17th century	The barn is in stone with quoins and a stone slate roof. It contains a doorway with a chamfered surround, a semicircular cart entry, and a doorway with an inscribed chamfered lintel. In the sides are circular owl holes.	II
Cottage north of Great House; 53.72873°N 2.07010°W	—	Late 17th century	A stone cottage with quoins and a stone slate roof. There are two storeys and four bays. The doorway has a heavy lintel, and all the windows have chamfered mullions.	II
Grey Stone and barn 53.72896°N 2.06311°W	—	Late 17th century	A long range of a house, cottages and a barn, with additions made until the 19th century. They are in stone and have stone slate roofs with coped gables. The house has two storeys and three bays, mullioned windows, and a gabled porch. The barn has a semicircular-arched cart entry and a square-headed lintel. The cottage dates from the 19th century and has a doorway with monolithic jambs.	II
Outbuilding northwest of Hartley Royd Farmhouse; 53.73597°N 2.12483°W	—	Late 17th century	The outbuilding is in stone and has a stone slate roof with coped gables on kneelers. There are two storeys and two bays. The building contains mullioned windows, two doorways, one of which is blocked to form a window, and the other has an inscribed and dated lintel, and in the upper floor is a dovecote.	II
Heyhead Farmhouse, barn and stable 53.70527°N 2.08328°W	—	Late 17th century	The house and attached barn have a roof with a coped gable. The house has two storeys, two bays. and an outshut, and the windows are mullioned. The barn to the east has two bays, a single aisle, and projects to the south. It contains a square-headed cart entry and a doorway.	II
Higher Birks; 53.73085°N 2.07414°W	—	Late 17th century	A stone house with a stone slate roof, it has two storeys and three unequal bays. The doorway is at the rear, and has chamfered surrounds, composite jambs, and a square lintel, and the windows have chamfered mullions.	II
Higher Longfield Farmhouse and cottages 53.70909°N 2.08979°W	—	Late 17th century	Two cottages are the older part, the farmhouse and another cottage being added in the 18th century, forming an L-shaped plan. The buildings are in stone, the earlier cottages with stone slate roofs, and the later buildings with slate roofs. Most of the windows are mullioned, and some doorways have monolithic jambs.	II
Knoll Top Farmhouse; 53.68012°N 2.07875°W	—	Late 17th century	The house, which was extended in the 19th century is in stone with stone slate roofs. The original part has two storeys and one bay, quoins, a doorway with a chamfered surround and a heavy lintel, and windows with chamfered mullions. The extension has three storeys and two bays, and attached to the northwest is a single-storey outbuilding.	II
North Hollingworth Farmhouse; 53.69197°N 2.09336°W	—	Late 17th century	The house was extended to the east in the 19th century. It is in stone with quoins, and has a stone slate roof with coped gables and kneelers. There are two storeys and three bays. The doorway has monolithic jambs, and the windows have chamfered mullions.	II
Pex Tenements; 53.72663°N 2.06474°W	—	Late 17th century	The house was extended in the 18th century with the addition of a kitchen wing. It is in stone with a stone slate roof and two storeys. There is a T-shaped plan, consisting of a three-bay main range and a two-bay rear wing. The rear wing has quoins and a coped gable with kneelers. The doorway has a chamfered surround, composite jambs and a straight lintel, and the windows have chamfered mullions.	II
Barn and cottage southwest of Pex Tenements; 53.72653°N 2.06501°W	—	Late 17th century	The barn and cottage, which was attached slightly later, are in stone with stone slate roofs. The barn is aisled to the east, and has a semicircular-arched cart entry with a chamfered surround, and a doorway with a quoined lintel and a chamfered surround. The cottage has two storeys, and a coped gable with kneelers. Both parts have windows with mullions, mainly double chamfered.	II
Rodwell Head; 53.72340°N 2.07447°W	—	Late 17th century	The house was extended in the 18th century by the addition of a larger house, and a further bay was added later. The house is in stone with quoins, and has a tile roof with coped gables and kneelers. The original house to the left contains windows with chamfered mullions and inserted windows. The 18th-century house is taller with a moulded eaves cornice, and three bays on the road front. In the middle of this front is a stair window with transoms, flanked by mullioned windows. In the left gable end is a Venetian window. The east front has five bays, the middle three bays projecting under a pediment. In the centre is a doorway with an architrave and a segmental pediment on consoles.	II
South Midgelden; 53.71164°N 2.14474°W	—	Late 17th century	The house is in stone with quoins and a stone slate roof. There are two storeys, two bays, and a range at right angles added in the 18th century. The windows have double chamfered mullions, and at the rear is an arched doorway with a hood mould on moulded corbels.	II
Upper House Farmhouse; 53.73079°N 2.05753°W	—	Late 17th century	A porch was added to the house in 1716. The house is in stone on a plinth, with a stone slate roof. There are two storeys, two bays, a rear outshut, and a gabled rear porch. The windows have chamfered mullions, those in the ground floor with a continuous stepped hood mould. The porch has a dated and initialled lintel.	II
Hipperholme Farmhouse; 53.73248°N 2.05563°W	—	1686	The house is in stone with a stone slate roof. There are two storeys, two bays, a single-storey outshut at the rear, and a lean-to on the front. The doorway has a chamfered surround and a square inscribed lintel, and above it is an arched window with spandrels. The other windows are mullioned.	II
Lower Horse Wood; 53.70289°N 2.07283°W	—	1689	A stone house on a plinth, with quoins, a string course, and a stone slate roof that has coped gables with kneelers. There are two storeys and two bays, and the windows are mullioned. In the left return is a gabled porch with jettying above the doorway containing a decorative inscribed tablet. The doorway has a chamfered surround, composite jambs, a depressed Tudor arched lintel, and sunken spandrels.	II
Causeway East Farmhouse; 53.71468°N 2.05650°W	—	1690	The house was largely rebuilt in the 19th century. It is in stone and has a slate roof with coped gables and kneelers. There are two storeys, three bays, and a rear outshut. The doorways are paired, and the windows are mullioned with altered glazing.	II
Mankinholes; 53.70771°N 2.06179°W		1690	The house is in stone and has a stone slate roof with a coped gable at the north end. There are two storeys and three bays. The windows have chamfered mullions, and there is a fire window. The doorway has a chamfered surround and a heavy lintel. At the rear is a gabled porch with a Tudor arched doorway and a moulded surround.	II
Higher Ashes Farmhouse; 53.72525°N 2.07983°W	—	1691	The house is in stone on a plinth, with a string course, and a stone slate roof with coped gables on kneelers with finials. There are two storeys, and the house consists of a hall range and two cross-wings projecting to the south, and a rear kitchen wing. The doorway has a moulded surround, above is it a datestone, and the windows have chamfered mullions.	II*
Chapel House Cottages; 53.72893°N 2.06337°W	—	Late 17th or early 18th century	A house, at one time used for worship, later divided into four cottages, it is in stone and has a stone slate roof with coped gables and kneelers. There are two storeys and five bays. One doorway has a segmental-arched lintel, another has a straight lintel, and the other cottages have inserted doorways. Most of the windows have chamfered mullions.	II
Deanroyd Farmhouse; 53.68705°N 2.09196°W	—	Late 17th to early 18th century	The farmhouse is in stone and has a stone slate roof with coped gables and kneelers. There are two storeys, three bays, and a single-storey outshut at the rear. The windows have chamfered mullions.	II
Gable End Farmhouse and barn 53.73153°N 2.06619°W	—	Late 17th to early 18th century	The house and barn are in stone with stone slate roofs. The house has quoins and coped gables. There are two storeys, two bays, and outshuts. The two doorways have composite jambs, and the windows have double chamfered mullions. The barn projects forward, and has a datestone and a mullioned window.	II
Barn northeast of Rodwell Head; 53.72347°N 2.07418°W	—	Late 17th to early 18th century	The barn is in stone with a stone slate roof. On the front is a segmental-arched cart entry, and a doorway with a segmental arch and a quoined lintel. At the rear is an aisle with an oculus, and a wing with a coped gable, containing a chamfered surround and a quoined lintel. In the gable apex is a dovecote.	II
General Wood; 53.69799°N 2.10194°W	—	1704	The house was refronted in the 19th century and has been divided into two. It is in stone with quoins, and has two storeys and three bays. The doorway has a reused lintel, and the windows are mullioned.	II
Cottage north of Higher Ashes; 53.72549°N 2.07980°W	—	1714	The cottage, later used for other purposes, is in stone, and has a stone slate roof with coped gables and kneelers. There is one storey and two bays. The central doorway has a chamfered surround and a dated and initialled lintel, and the windows have double chamfered mullions.	II
Lower Allescholes; 53.68346°N 2.09835°W	—	1715	A stone house with quoins at the rear, and a slate roof with coped gables and kneelers. There are two storeys and three bays. The doorway has a segmental dated arch and a chamfered surround, and the windows have double chamfered mullions.	II
Barn southeast of Oldroyd Farmhouse; 53.71298°N 2.07858°W	—	1720	The barn is in stone with quoins and a stone slate roof. It contains an arched cart entry and a doorway, both with chamfered surrounds. The doorway has a dated and initialled lintel.	II
19 and 21 Top o'th Hill Road; 53.69783°N 2.10298°W	—	Early 18th century	A pair of stone cottages with a stone slate roof, two storeys, and two bays. The windows have chamfered surrounds, the left door has a segmental-arched lintel, and the other door has monolithic jambs.	II
Barn west of 25 Top o'th Hill Road; 53.69804°N 2.10226°W	—	Early 18th century	The barn is in stone with a stone slate roof, and has a semicircular-arched cart entry. There is a half-aisle that has quoins and a doorway.	II
Brink Top Farmhouse; 53.70849°N 2.06831°W	—	Early 18th century	The farmhouse is in stone and has two storeys and three bays. On the front is a projecting gabled porch with a chimney that contains a corbelled flue over a bakestone and a sink. The windows are mullioned.	II
Causeway Farmhouse, West Causeway and barn 53.70713°N 2.07455°W	—	Early 18th century	The house, which has been converted into two dwellings, and the barn are in stone and have a stone slate roof. The house has quoins, a moulded stone gutter, two storeys and three bays. The doorway has chamfered jambs and an arched lintel, and the windows have chamfered mullions. The barn to the right projects forward, and has a cart entry with a straight lintel and doorways with chamfered surrounds.	II
Chapel House Farmhouse and barn 53.72895°N 2.06301°W	—	Early 18th century	A laithe house in stone with quoins, and a stone slate roof with coped gables and kneelers. The house has two storeys, two bays, a gabled porch with quoins, and windows with double chamfered mullions. The barn has an arched doorway with a chamfered surround, and in the right return are chamfered vents.	II
Fern House, Fern Cottage and attached factory 53.70652°N 2.12188°W	—	Early 18th century	A pair of back to back houses and an attached former factory, they are in stone with slate roofs. The houses have two storeys and an attic, and a symmetrical front of three bays. In the middle bay is a porch, and double doors with monolithic jambs, and in the outer bays are chamferd mullioned stepped windows. To the right is the factory bay, which is higher and has a taking-in door in the upper floor.	II
Gauxholme Stones Farmhouse; 53.69962°N 2.10731°W	—	Early 18th century	A stone house with quoins and a stone slate roof. There are two storeys and a single-storey extension on the right. The doorway has monolithic jambs, and most of the windows are mullioned.	II
Great House Clough; 53.72802°N 2.07160°W	—	Early 18th century	A house linked to a slightly later cottage by 20th-century infill. Both buildings are in stone with quoins, and the house has coped gables and kneelers. The windows in both have chamfered mullions.	II
Henshaw Farmhouse; 53.69648°N 2.09986°W	—	Early 18th century	A laithe house in stone with quoins and a stone slate roof. The barn is on the left, and has a doorway with a heavy lintel and a cart entry. The house has two storeys, two bays, a gabled porch, and mullioned windows. In the right gable end is a doorway in the upper floor that has been converted into a window.	II
Heys Farmhouse; 53.69446°N 2.11042°W	—	Early 18th century	The farmhouse is in stone, with quoins and a stone slate roof. There are two storeys and four bays. The doorway has a chamfered surround and composite jambs, and all the windows have chamfered mullions.	II
Killup Farmhouse and barn 53.72897°N 2.07791°W	—	Early 18th century	The house and attached barn are in stone with quoins and stone slate roofs. The house is the older, and has two storeys, two bays, and a rear outshut. The barn dates from the 19th century, and contains a cart entry with a heavy lintel.	II
Cottages northeast of Lad Stones; 53.72010°N 2.06621°W	—	Early 18th century	A pair of cottages, later combined, the building is in stone with a stone slate roof, two storeys, and a symmetrical front of three bays. In the centre is a semicircular-arched entry with a portal containing two doorways. The windows have chamfered mullions.	II
Cottage northwest of Lane Top Farmhouse; 53.73137°N 2.07018°W	—	Early 18th century	The cottage has since been used for agricultural purposes. It is in stone with quoins and has a stone slate roof. There are two storeys and two bays. The windows have chamfered mullions.	II
Lodge Hall; 53.68445°N 2.07843°W	—	Early 18th century	A laithe house in stone with quoins and a stone slate roof. The house has two storeys and two bays, a central gabled porch, and windows with chamfered mullions. The barn to the left has a cart entry and a doorway, both with chamfered surrounds and heavy lintels, and a mullioned window.	II
Mankinholes Farmhouse and Antwerp Cottage; 53.70805°N 2.06214°W	—	Early 18th century	A house, later two dwellings, it is in stone and has a stone slate roof with coped gables and kneelers. There are two storeys and three bays, and a rear cross-wing. On the front is a shallow porch with an entablature and a triangular pediment, and a doorway with monolithic jambs. The windows have chamfered mullions.	II
Middle Midgelden; 53.71190°N 2.14451°W	—	Early 18th century	A stone house with a stone slate roof, two storeys and three bays. The doorway has a chamfered surround, composite jambs, and a square-headed lintel, and the windows are mullioned.	II
Milestone southwest of Shepherd's Rest Public House; 53.70366°N 2.08636°W		Early 18th century	The milestone is set against a wall by a former packhorse track. It has chamfered corners, and is inscribed with script typical of the 18th century.	II
New Bridge; 53.70793°N 2.06780°W	—	Early 18th century	A pair of stone cottages with quoins, and a slate roof with a stone ridge. There are two storeys, a double-depth plan, and three bays. The doorways have chamfered surrounds, and the windows have chamfered mullions.	II
North Ramsden; 53.68849°N 2.11767°W	—	Early 18th century	The building has been extended, and consists of two cottages and an attached barn. They are in stone with quoins, and have a roof of stone slate and blue slate and coped gables. The cottages have two storeys, the right cottage has two bays and paired doorways. The cottage to the left has one bay and a doorway with monolithic jambs, and both cottages have mullioned windows. The barn, further to the left, contains a segmental-arch cart entry.	II
Ragby Bridge; 53.69032°N 2.12048°W		Early 18th century (probable)	A former packhorse bridge crossing the Ramsden Clough, it is in stone and consists of a single arch. It springs from a boulder plinth, and has gritstone voussoirs, and slightly swept abutments.	II
Cottage north of Rodwell Head; 53.72362°N 2.07419°W	—	Early 18th century	The cottage, later used for agricultural purposes, is in stone with quoins, a band, a cornice, and a stone slate roof. There are two storeys and two bays. The doorways have chamfered surrounds and quoined lintels, and the windows have chamfered mullions.	II
Scout Farmhouse and barn 53.72861°N 2.10568°W	—	Early 18th century	The house and integral barn are in stone with quoins and a stone slate roof. The house has two storeys, a double-depth plan, and a rear outshut. The windows have double chamfered mullions. The barn projects forward, it has three bays, and contains a segmental-arched cart entry, and a doorway with a moulded surround.	II
Sweet Briar Cottage; 53.68621°N 2.08902°W	—	Early 18th century	A stone cottage with quoins, a stone slate roof, two storeys and two bays. On the front is a porch, and the windows have double chamfered mullions.	II
The Cottage, Mankinholes; 53.70782°N 2.06183°W	—	Early 18th century	The house was extended in the 19th century. It is in stone, with quoins, and a stone slate roof with gables and kneelers. There are two storeys and three bays. The windows are mullioned, and there are two doorways, one with a chamfered surround, and the other, which is blocked, has a heavy lintel.	II
West Bar and barn 53.73722°N 2.13522°W	—	Early 18th century	The house and barn were extended in the 19th century, and are in stone with a stone slate roof. The house has two storeys and three bays, a doorway with monolithic jambs, and mullioned windows. The barn has a cart entry with a chamfered surround, composite jambs, and a square lintel, and a doorway with a quoined lintel.	II
White Slack; 53.68086°N 2.10990°W	—	Early 18th century	A laithe house, consisting of a house and attached barn in stone.	II
Whiteley Royd Farmhouse and barn 53.73236°N 2.05885°W	—	Early 18th century	The house and barn are in stone with stone slate roofs. The house has quoins, a projecting moulded gutter, two storeys, a double-pile plan, and two bays. On the front is a gabled porch, and the windows have double chamfered mullions. The barn to the right has coped gables, a semicircular-arched cart entry, and a rectangular vent.	II
Allescholes Guide Post; 53.67885°N 2.09099°W		Early to mid 18th century	The milestone stands by a footpath, it has a square section, and is inscribed on all four sides. It indicates the distances to Todmorden, Rochdale and Burnley.	II
Higher Stoodley Cottage; 53.71723°N 2.05471°W	—	1744	A stone house with quoins, and a stone slate roof with coped gables and kneelers, and two storeys. The doorways have monolithic jambs, and the doorway at the rear has a carved, dated and initialled lintel. The windows have mullions, most of them chamfered.	II
3, 4 and 5 Hole Bottom Road; 53.72364°N 2.09320°W	—	18th century	A house, later a row of three cottages, in stone with quoins at the rear, and a stone slate roof. There two storeys, four bays, and a rear single-storey outshut. The windows are mullioned, and the main doorway has a chamfered surround, composite jambs, and a square lintel.	II
5 and 7 Mankinholes; 53.70790°N 2.06163°W	—	Mid 18th century	A pair of cottages, now combined, the building is in stone with quoins, and a stone slate roof with gables and kneelers. There are two storeys, and a T-shaped plan consisting of a two bay range, and a rear gabled wing. The original doorway has a quoined lintel, and there is a 20th-century porch. The windows are mullioned.	II
East Hey Head Farmhouse and barn 53.72731°N 2.08363°W	—	Mid 18th century	The farmhouse is the older, the barn being added in the 19th century. The buildings are in stone, and have a stone slate roof with coped gables and kneelers. The house has quoins, two storeys, two bays, and a single-storey extension to the right. The windows have chamfered mullions. The barn to the left has a semicircular-arched cart entry and over it is a Venetian window.	II
Eastwood Old Hall and barn 53.72887°N 2.05892°W	—	Mid 18th century	The house and barn are in stone with stone slate roofs. The house has quoins, a cornice, and coped gables with moulded kneelers. There are two storeys, a double-depth plan, and two bays. The doorway has an architrave, a pulvinated frieze, and a moulded triangular pediment, and the windows have double chamfered mullions. The barn is recessed, and has a segmental-arched cart entry, composite jambs, and an inscribed keystone, and above it is a Venetian window that has been altered to form a pitching hole.	II
Fielden House and Lee Bottom Cottage; 53.71588°N 2.05546°W	—	Mid 18th century	The house and attached laithe house are in stone with stone slate roofs. The laithe house to the left is the earlier, it has quoins, two storeys, one bay, a doorway, mullioned windows, and one sash window. The barn to the right has a segmental-arched cart entry with a Venetian window above, and a doorway. The house, further to the right, has rusticated quoins, an eaves band, two storeys and three bays. The doorway has monolithic jambs, a pulvinated frieze, and a cornice, and the windows have modern glazing.	II
Grindstone circle and grindstone 53.70141°N 2.10434°W	—	18th century (possible)	The grindstone is in the garden behind 12 Rock Terrace and was used for grinding sand. It consists of a circle of hollowed stones, and in the centre is a square hole sunk at junction of a cross.	II
Barn west of Hartley Royd Farmhouse; 53.73582°N 2.12498°W	—	Mid 18th century	The barn is in stone and has an asbestos roof. It contains two cart entries, one with a segmental arch, the other with a semicircular arch.	II
Higher Langfield Cottages and barn 53.70899°N 2.09030°W	—	Mid 18th century	The two cottages have been combined into a house, and the barn was added in the 19th century. The buildings are in stone with stone slate roofs. The house has quoins, a convex moulded gutter, and a coped gable. There are two storeys, paired doorways with monolithic jambs, and windows with chamfered surrounds. The barn, attached to the east, has a semicircular-arched cart entry with imposts and a keystone, a semicircular-arched window, and rectangular vents.	II
Barn west of Lower Birks; 53.73042°N 2.06576°W	—	Mid 18th century	A stone barn with a stone slate roof and three bays, it contains a segmental arched cart entry with monolithic jambs. Added to the north is a cottage that has a doorway with a chamfered surround and monolithic jambs, and a mullioned window.	II
Barn, Lower Ditches; 53.69093°N 2.12629°W	—	Mid 18th century	The barn is in stone with quoins, and a stone slate roof. There is an aisle to the east, a porch to the west, and three bays. The barn has opposing square-headed cart entries, and pitching holes in the gable ends.	II
Barn north east of Middle Midgelden; 53.71198°N 2.14432°W	—	Mid 18th century	The barn is in stone with quoins, and a stone slate roof. It contains a segmental-arched cart entry flanked by buttresses, a porch within a portal, and a doorway.	II
Barn north east of Middle Stoodley House; 53.71878°N 2.05372°W	—	Mid 18th century	The barn is in stone, and has a stone slate roof with coped gables and kneelers. It is a long barn with four bays, and contains doorways and a semicircular-arched cart entry.	II
Milepost, Lumbutts Lane; 53.70751°N 2.06909°W		18th century	The milestone is on the north side of the lane. It is an upright stone inscribed on three faces, and indicates the distances to Rochdale, Heptonstall, and Halifax.	II
Nicklety; 53.69373°N 2.10765°W	—	Mid 18th century	A stone house with quoins and a stone slate roof. There are three storeys and two bays. The windows on the front are stepped with five lights and chamfered mullions. In the left return is a porch and sash windows.	II
Stone water trough 53.70752°N 2.06152°W	—	18th century (probable)	The trough is on a former packhorse way. It consists of four linked rectangular troughs, and at each end is a circular basin with an outlet for the water. The trough is fed by a central channelled gutter.	II
Waterstalls; 53.68616°N 2.08624°W	—	Mid 18th century	A house with an attached barn to the left, it is in stone with a stone slate roof. The house has two storeys and two bays, a doorway with monolithic jambs, and mullioned windows. The barn has a semicircular-headed cart entry, and a doorway with a large lintel.	II
Garden gate piers, Lower Ashes Farmhouse; 53.72416°N 2.07798°W	—	c. 1759	The gate piers in the garden wall to the south of the farmhouse are in stone. They have a square plan, and each pier has fluted Doric pilasters on two faces, a wide dentil cornice, and a ball finial.	II
Higher Stoodley Farmhouse; 53.71746°N 2.05472°W	—	c. 1770	The farmhouse is in stone with raised rusticated quoins, a band, a cornice, and a stone slate roof with coped gables and kneelers. There are two storeys and an attic, and three bays. The doorway has monolithic jambs, a fluted entablature, and a triangular pediment. The windows on the front have double chamfered mullions and projecting surrounds, and in the right return are sash windows and a circular attic window.	II
6 and 8 Clough Road; 53.69586°N 2.10490°W	—	Late 18th century	A pair of cottages later combined into one, in stone with a stone slate roof. There are two storeys and three bays. The doorway has monolithic jambs, and the windows are mullioned with chamfered surrounds.	II
9 and 10 Hole Bottom Road; 53.72229°N 2.09244°W	—	Late 18th century	An additional cottage was added in the 19th century. The cottages are in stone with quoins and a stone slate roof. The earlier cottage has two storeys and three bays, and the windows are mullioned. The later cottage has three storeys and two bays, and the windows are square with plain surrounds.	II
22–36 Square Road; 53.69250°N 2.10064°W		Late 18th century	A row of stone cottages with quoins, moulded gutter brackets and stone slate roofs. They have two storeys, there are eight bays, and most of the windows have chamfered mullions.	II
Bridge No. 33; 53.69654°N 2.10347°W		Late 18th century	The bridge carries Alma Road over the Rochdale Canal. It is in stone, and consists of a single segmental arch. The bridge has rusticated voussoirs, a keystone, and a parapet.	II
Bridge No. 34, Hollins Bridge; 53.69536°N 2.10079°W		Late 18th century	The bridge carries Hollins Road over the Rochdale Canal. It is in stone, and consists of a single horseshoe elliptical arch. The bridge has rusticated voussoirs, a band, and a parapet.	II
Bridge No. 35, Birks Hall Bridge; 53.69437°N 2.09962°W		Late 18th century	The bridge carries St Peter's Gate over the Rochdale Canal. It is in stone, and consists of a single segmental arch. The bridge has rusticated voussoirs, a keystone, a band, and a parapet.	II
Bridge No. 37, Deanroyd Bridge; 53.68549°N 2.09325°W		Late 18th century	The bridge carries Deanroyd Road over the Rochdale Canal. It is in stone, and consists of a single segmental arch. The bridge has rusticated voussoirs, a band, and a parapet.	II
Bridge No. 38, Lane Bottom Bridge; 53.68434°N 2.09146°W		Late 18th century	The bridge carries Bottomley Road over the Rochdale Canal. It is in stone and consists of a single segmental arch. The bridge has rusticated voussoirs, a band, and a curving parapet.	II
Bridge No. 39, Stone House Bridge; 53.68273°N 2.08967°W		Late 18th century	The bridge carries a road over the Rochdale Canal. It is in stone and consists of a single segmental arch. The bridge has rusticated voussoirs, a band, a keystone and a parapet with cappings.	II
Calf Lee Farmhouse; 53.67928°N 2.07326°W	—	Late 18th century	A laithe house in stone with a stone slate roof. The house has two storeys and one bay. On the front is a gabled porch and mullioned windows, and at the rear are sash windows. The barn is to the right, and has a segmental-arched cart entry, and to the left is an extension and an outshut.	II
Friths Farmhouse; 53.70639°N 2.11432°W	—	Late 18th century	A laithe house in stone with quoins and a stone slate roof. The house has two storeys and two bays. The doorway has monolithic jambs, the windows at the rear are mullioned, and at the front they are sashes. The barn has a semicircular-arched entry and a Venetian window above.	II
Latchford cottage and Wickenbury cottage 53.72553°N 2.09229°W	—	Late 18th century	A single-storey outshut was added to the house in 1833. The house has been divided into two, and is in stone with quoins and a stone slate roof. There are two storeys, and most of the windows are mullioned.	II
Lower East Lee Cottage; 53.72577°N 2.06193°W	—	Late 18th century	A stone house with quoins and a stone slate roof. There are two storeys and a symmetrical front of five bays. It has a gabled porch, and square windows with plain surrounds.	II
Milestone opposite 77 Bacup Road; 53.70519°N 2.11509°W		Late 18th century	The milestone is on the north side of Bacup Road (A681 road). The stone has a rounded top and is inscribed with pointing hands, and indicates the distances to Todmorden, Bacup and Haslingden.	II
Milestone next to Owler Mill; 53.71047°N 2.13612°W		Late 18th century	The milestone is on the north side of Bacup Road (A681 road). The stone has two angled faces, and is semicircular at the rear. It is inscribed with pointing hands, and indicates the distances to Todmorden and Bacup	II
North Midgelden; 53.71246°N 2.14403°W	—	Late 18th century	Two cottages, later combined into a house, which is in stone and has a stone slate roof. There is one storey and an attic, and two bays. On the front are paired doorways, and the windows are mullioned.	II
Barn north of North Midgelden Farmhouse; 53.71259°N 2.14390°W	—	Late 18th century	A stone barn with quoins and a stone slate roof. There are three bays, and the barn contains a semicircular-headed cart entry and a doorway.	II
Barn north of Upper Shaw; 53.71433°N 2.06165°W	—	Late 18th century	The barn is in stone with a stone slate roof and four bays. It contains a semicircular-arched cart entry, two doorways and vents, all with chamfered surrounds, and in the gable apex is an owl hole.	II
Shore Baptist Church and Sunday School; 53.73590°N 2.13146°W	—	1777	The church was enlarged in 1833 and 1871. It is in stone with a slate roof, and has an L-shaped plan, the church forming the cross-wing. The southeast front has a pediment, twin round-arched portals, and a round-arched window above. The Sunday school to the west has a single storey.	II
Lock No. 25, Smithyholme Lock; 53.70036°N 2.10535°W		1798	The lock on the Rochdale Canal has a chamber lined with brick and blue brick headers. There are large dressed stone cappings and rebates for gates.	II
Lock No. 26, Pinnel Lock; 53.69857°N 2.10525°W		1798	The lock on the Rochdale Canal has rusticated stone walls with capping and rebates for the gates. It is fitted with the facility for a double set of bottom gates. There is a square angled entry with stone steps going down to a lower canal level.	II
Lock No. 27, Hollings Lock; 53.69638°N 2.10335°W		1798	The lock on the Rochdale Canal has large stone retaining walls and cappings with rebate for gates. It is fitted with the facility for a double set of bottom gates.	II
Lock No. 28, Birks Mill Lock; 53.69419°N 2.09958°W		1798	The lock on the Rochdale Canal has rusticated stone blocks and rebates for the gates. It is fitted with the facility for a double set of bottom gates.	II
Lock No. 29, Nip Square Lock; 53.69231°N 2.09953°W		1798	The lock on the Rochdale Canal has massive rusticated stone retaining walls and cappings, and rebates for the gates.	II
Lock No. 30, Winterbutlee Lock; 53.69064°N 2.09976°W		1798	The lock on the Rochdale Canal has massive rusticated stone retaining walls and cappings, and rebates for the gates.	II
Lock No. 31, Lightbank Lock; 53.68805°N 2.09560°W		1798	The lock on the Rochdale Canal has stone retaining walls and cappings, and rebates for the gates. It is fitted with the facility for a double set of bottom gates.	II
Lock No. 32, Sands Lock; 53.68536°N 2.09305°W		1798	The lock on the Rochdale Canal has large dressed stone retaining walls, and rebates for the gates. It is fitted with the facility for a double set of bottom gates.	II
Lock No. 33, Bottomley Lock; 53.68420°N 2.09134°W		1798	The lock on the Rochdale Canal has large dressed stone retaining walls and cappings, and rebates for the gates.	II
Lock No. 34, Warland Lower Lock, and footbridge 53.67954°N 2.08551°W		1798	The lock on the Rochdale Canal has massive stone retaining walls and cappings, with rebates for the gates. It is fitted with the facility for a double set of bottom gates. At the western end is a stone footbridge that consists of a single segmental span. This has a parapet with curved splayed sides and a square pillar at the north end.	II
Lock No. 35, Warland Upper Lock; 53.67792°N 2.08395°W		1798	The lock on the Rochdale Canal has massive stone retaining walls and cappings, with rebates for the gates.	II
Strines Cottage and House; 53.68849°N 2.10339°W	—	Late 18th or early 19th century	A pair of stone cottages with a stone slate roof, two storeys and two bays. The doorways have composite jambs, and the windows are mullioned.	II
20 Square Road; 53.69273°N 2.10055°W	—	1808	A stone cottage with quoins and a stone slate roof. There are two storeys and one bay, and the windows have chamfered mullions.	II
Stoodley Pike Monument; 53.71429°N 2.04236°W		1815	The monument was erected to commemorate the surrender of Paris in 1814, it collapsed in 1854 and was rebuilt two years later, and it was restored in 1889. It is 120 feet (37 m) high, and is in stone. The base has piers carrying a cornice and an octagonal gallery with a balustrade 40 feet (12 m) above the ground, and on the base is an obelisk. Between the piers is a segmental-arched entrance with voussoirs and a keystone carved with the Star of David. Above the entrance is an inscribed tablet.	II
Bridge over River Calder, Walsden; 53.69645°N 2.10367°W	—	1816	The bridge carries Alma Road over the River Calder. It is in stone, and consists of a single segmental arch. The bridge has rusticated voussoirs, a dated keystone, a projecting string course, and a parapet with cappings.	II
Greenhurst Hey Farmhouse and barn 53.72840°N 2.09284°W	—	1816	The farmhouse and attached barn are in stone with slate roofs. The house has rusticated quoins, a moulded cornice, two storeys, and a symmetrical front of three bays. The central doorway has pilasters, a fanlight, and a pediment, and the windows are sashes. Recessed and to the left is a barn that has semicircular cart entries over which is a Venetian window with a date and initials.	II
Steanor Bottom Toll House; 53.67499°N 2.08448°W		1824	The former toll house is in stone with quoins, and has a tripartite hipped stone slate roof. The house has two storeys, a semi-octagonal front, and a later rear extension. In the middle of the three bays facing the road is a doorway, above which is a semicircular-headed recess containing the replica of a toll board. The other bays contain sash windows with semicircular heads, and the bays at the rear are blind.	II*
5 and 9 Hollins Road; 53.70121°N 2.10532°W	—	Early 19th century	Three cottages, later combined into two, the building is in stone with quoins and a stone slate roof. There are two storeys and three bays. The doorways have heavy lintels, one has been converted into a window, and the other windows are mullioned.	II
7 and 9 Lumbutts Road; 53.70747°N 2.07008°W	—	Early 19th century	A pair of stone cottages with quoins and a stone slate roof. There are three storeys and three bays. The windows are mullioned, and on the sides are doorways in the middle floor approached by flights of stone steps.	II
11 and 13 Lumbutts Road; 53.70751°N 2.06984°W	—	Early 19th century	A pair of cottages, later combined into one, it is in stone with quoins and a stone slate roof. There are two storeys, two bays, and a later single-bay extension on the left. The windows are mullioned, and there are two doorways.	II
14–40 Ramsden Wood Road; 53.68851°N 2.10193°W		Early 19th century	A long row of cottages, in stone with quoins and stone slate roofs. They have two storeys and there are 14 bays. Each cottage has a doorway and mullioned windows. 34–40 are at a higher level.	II
69 Ramsden Wood Road; 53.68737°N 2.10813°W	—	Early 19th century	A pair of cottages later combined into a house, it is in stone with a stone slate roof. There are two storeys and two bays. Each cottage has a doorway and mullioned windows.	II
748–752 Rochdale Road; 53.68967°N 2.10186°W	—	Early 19th century	A row of three stone cottages with quoins on the left, moulded gutter brackets and a stone slate roof. There are two storeys and three bays. Each cottage has a doorway, and a mullioned window in each floor.	II
2 Square Road; 53.69312°N 2.10036°W	—	Early 19th century	Two cottages, later one house, it is in stone, the right return rendered, with quoins and a stone slate roof. There are two storeys and two bays. The right doorway has been converted into a window, and the windows are mullioned.	II
6–14 Square Road; 53.69293°N 2.10048°W	—	Early 19th century	Six cottages, later four dwellings, they are in stone with quoins and a stone slate roof. There are two storeys and six bays. The doorways have chamfered surrounds and the windows have chamfered mullions.	II
16 and 18 Square Road; 53.69280°N 2.10061°W	—	Early 19th century	A pair of stone cottages with quoins and a stone slate roof. There are two storeys and each cottage has one bay. The windows have chamfered mullions.	II
Cally Hall; 53.72731°N 2.09481°W	—	Early 19th century	A laithe house, it is in stone with quoins and a stone slate roof. The house has two storeys and one bay, a doorway with monolithic jambs, and mullioned windows. The barn, which has been extended, has a semicircular-arched cart entry.	II
Cow Bridge; 53.73510°N 2.05303°W		Early 19th century	The bridge, which carries a track over a stream, is in stone, and consists of a single segmental arch with voussoirs.	II
Dean Bottom Farmhouse and barn 53.73650°N 2.05628°W	—	Early 19th century	The farmhouse and barn are in stone with quoins and stone slate roofs. The house has two storeys, four bays, and a rear outshut. The windows in the ground floor are mullioned, and in the upper floor and at the rear are square windows. The barn is higher and contains a doorway and a segmental-arched cart entry. In the left gable end are arrow slit vents and a circular opening in the apex.	II
Halshaw Clough; 53.70936°N 2.12585°W	—	Early 19th century	A row of four stone cottages with a stone slate roof. There are two storeys and four bays, and the windows are mullioned.	II
Higher Lee; 53.70453°N 2.06808°W	—	Early 19th century	A pair of stone cottages with a stone slate roof. They have two storeys and two bays. At the rear are two gabled porches, and the windows have five lights and are mullioned.	II
Higher Scout; 53.68921°N 2.08706°W		Early 19th century	A laithe house with added cottages, they are in stone with stone slate roofs, and have two storeys. The row consists of a single-bay cottage at the left, then the laithe house consisting of a barn and a cottage, then two more single-bay cottages. They contain quoins, the windows are mullioned, and the barn has a semicircular-arched cart entry.	II
Mill to rear of Jumps; 53.73053°N 2.11954°W	—	Early 19th century	The watermill is in stone with a band, three storeys, and three bays. In the ground floor are three open semicircular arches, and windows with plain surrounds and heavy lintels. To the right is a three-bay cottage with mullioned windows, beyond which is a cast iron overshot waterwheel, and beyond that is a lean-to with a semicircular-arched entry.	II
Lumbutts Methodist Church; 53.70687°N 2.06551°W		Early 19th century	The church, which was rebuilt in 1860–70, is in stone with a slate roof. There are two storeys and five bays. The entrance front is gabled and has quoined buttresses, and an arched doorway with a hood mould. Above the doorway is a large four-light window with a pointed head, and to the sides are lancet windows. Along the sides of the church are two tiers of paired lancet windows.	II
Water tower, Lumbutts Old Mill; 53.70731°N 2.06730°W		Early 19th century	The water tower to a former cotton mill, now demolished, is in stone, and consists of a tower 98 feet (30 m) high. The tower is rectangular with a circular projection containing a spiral staircase, and has three stages. In each stage are semicircular-headed doorways, and at the top is a balustrade.	II
Milestone next to No. 371 Rochdale Road; 53.70135°N 2.10671°W		Early 19th century	The milestone is on the east side of Rochdale Road (A6033 road). It has an arched head, and is inscribed with "WALSDEN" and has pointing hands and the distances to Todmorden and Rochdale.	II
Milestone next to No. 774 Rochdale Road; 53.68858°N 2.10097°W		Early 19th century	The milestone is on the west side of Rochdale Road (A6033 road). It has an arched head, and is inscribed with pointing hands and the distances to Todmorden and Rochdale.	II
Milestone at NGR SD 896239; 53.71164°N 2.15901°W		Early 19th century	The milestone is on the north side of the A681 road. It has an arched head, and is inscribed with pointing hands and the distances to Todmorden and Bacup.	II
Milestone near Sportsman's Arms; 53.74179°N 2.10366°W		Early 19th century	The milestone stands on the south side of Kebs Road near to the junction with Eastwood Road. It consists of a rectangular stone inscribed with the distances to Burnley and Halifax.	II
Miller Barn; 53.69405°N 2.10321°W	—	Early 19th century	A laithe house, it is in stone with a stone slate roof. The house has quoins, two storeys, a doorway with monolithic jambs, and windows, some mullioned, some square. In the barn is a semicircular cart entry.	II
Mount Pleasant; 53.72803°N 2.06369°W	—	Early 19th century	A pair of stone cottages with quoins and a stone slate roof. There are two storeys and an attic, and a double-pile plan. Each cottage has a doorway and the windows are mullioned.	II
Rake Hey Farmhouse and barn 53.73171°N 2.11096°W	—	Early 19th century	The farmhouse and barn are in stone, and have stone slate roofs with a coped gable and kneelers. The house has two storeys and two bays. There is a central gabled porch, and the windows are mullioned. The barn has a semicircular cart entry, and a doorway with a chamfered surround.	II
Ratcher Cottages; 53.72432°N 2.09351°W	—	Early 19th century	A pair of stone cottages with quoins and a stone slate roof. There are three storeys and two bays. Each cottage has a doorway and a five-light mullioned window in each floor. In the middle floor of the right return is a blocked taking-in door.	II
Rough Top; 53.71955°N 2.04260°W	—	Early 19th century	A laithe house, it is in stone with quoins, and has a stone slate roof with a coped gable. The house has two storeys, two bays, and a single-storey outshut. The windows are stepped with mullions. The barn has a semicircular cart entry with a Venetian window above.	II
Stones Wood House; 53.70789°N 2.12367°W	—	Early 19th century	A stone house on a plinth, with quoins, a moulded cornice, and a stone slate roof. There are two storeys, and a symmetrical front of three bays. The central segmental-arched doorway has pilasters, a panelled entablature, and a moulded pediment, and the windows are sashes.	II
Stoodley Edge (North) Farmhouse and barn 53.71822°N 2.04800°W	—	Early 19th century	A house with a barn added later, it is in stone and has a stone slate roof with coped gables and kneelers. The house has two storeys, two bays, and a gabled outshut on the west front with a three-light mullioned window and a sash window above. At the rear is another outshut with a five-light window. In the barn is a central arched cart entry with a Venetian window above and flanked by doorways.	II
The Mullions; 53.68735°N 2.10800°W	—	Early 19th century	Four cottages combined into two dwellings, they are in stone with a stone slate roof. There are two storeys and four bays. The windows have mullions, and two doorways have been replaced by windows.	II
Barn southwest of Upper House Farmhouse; 53.73069°N 2.05781°W	—	Early 19th century	The barn is in stone with a stone slate roof. On the front is a segmental-arched cart entry, above it is a circular window with four keystones, and to the right is a doorway.	II
Wittonstall End Farmhouse and Cottage; 53.73718°N 2.13307°W	—	Early 19th century	A house, later two dwellings, which incorporates some 17th-century material. It is in stone with a stone slate roof, two storeys, and three bays. The doorway has monolithic jambs, and most of the windows have chamfered mullions.	II
Pitts; 53.73649°N 2.13873°W	—	1828	A pair of stone cottages with a stone slate roof. There are two storeys, a double-pile plan, and two bays. Each cottage has a doorway with quoined jambs, and three-light mullioned windows.	II
Congregational Sunday School; 53.71063°N 2.13956°W	—	1829	The former Sunday school is in stone, and has a stone slate roof. There is a single storey and seven bays, and the windows are sashes. In the centre is a doorway, above which is a recessed inscribed plaque.	II
Blue Bell Lane Farmhouse and barn 53.73718°N 2.12844°W	—	Early to mid 19th century	The farmhouse and attached barn are in stone with quoins and a stone slate roof with coped gables and kneelers. The house has two storeys and three bays, and contains a doorway and mullioned windows. The barn has a semicircular-arched cart entry and a doorway.	II
Melling Clough, Bacup Road; 53.70980°N 2.13017°W	—	1837	A row of four stone cottages with quoins, moulded gutter brackets, and a stone slate roof. There are two storeys and four bays. The cottages have doorways with a chamfered surround and double chamfered mullioned windows. On the front is date tablet with the numbers set in the spandrels of a quatrefoil.	II
Inchfield; 53.69240°N 2.10334°W	—	1848	A stone house with a slate roof, two storeys and an attic, and a front of three bays. In the middle bay is a gabled porch with elaborate moulded jambs, and a depressed arch with foliate spandrels. Above the doorway is a heraldic bust. The gable is coped with a kneeler on the left, and on the right is the date and a monster on foliage. The outer bays are gabled with oriel windows in the upper floor, and the other windows have chamfered mullions.	II
Barn northeast of Brink Top Farmhouse; 53.70863°N 2.06813°W	—	1850	The barn is in stone with a stone slate roof. In the centre is an arched cart entry with a dated keystone, over which is a round-headed window with a raised keystone and impost. Flanking the cart entry are two square windows on each side. To the left is an outshut, and in the right return are chamfered vents and a pitching hole with a semicircular head.	II
Hawk Stones West; 53.74194°N 2.11970°W	—	Mid 19th century	A laithe house in stone with a slate roof. The house has two storeys, a double-depth plan, and one bay. The doorway has monolithic jambs, and the windows are mullioned. In the barn is an arched cart entry.	II
Lumbutts House; 53.70749°N 2.06774°W	—	Mid 19th century	The house is in stone with rusticated quoins, an eaves band, moulded gutter brackets, and a stone slate roof that has coped gables with kneelers. There are two storeys on the front, and three on the left return. The front is symmetrical with three bays, and has a central doorway with a plain surround and a moulded cornice. The windows on the front are sashes. In the right return is an arched cart entry and mullioned windows.	II
Barn and cottage north of Higher Ashes Cottage; 53.72537°N 2.08000°W	—	1854	A laithe house in stone that has a stone slate roof with coped gables with kneelers. The cottage has two storeys and one bay, a central doorway, and windows with chamfered mullions. The barn to the right has a semicircular-arched cart entry with a dated keystone and chamfered jambs. Above it is a window with a plain surround, and to the right is a doorway.	II
Independent Chapel; 53.71122°N 2.13802°W		1854	The chapel is in stone with quoins, bracketed eaves, and a hipped slate roof. The entrance front is symmetrical with three bays. In the centre is a round-headed doorway with double doors, an inscribed plaque, and a fanlight. On the front and sides are two tiers of round-headed windows.	II
Hollins Mill; 53.69523°N 2.10165°W		1856–58	A cotton spinning and weaving mill, later used for other purposes, it is in gritstone and has roofs of slate and glass. Its buildings include a four-storey, 18-bay spinning mill with a triple-span roof, a single-storey, a 25-bay weaving mill with a trapezoidal plan, an engine house, a two-storey boiler house with a triangular plan, workshops and stores with two storeys that are six bays long and two bays wide, and a 14-bay shed. The office and warehouse range at the entrance to the site have two storeys and six bays.	II
Tower, St Peter's Church, Walsden; 53.69487°N 2.09866°W		1864	The church was a Commissioners' Church built in 1846–48, and the tower and spire were added later. The church burnt down in 1948, and the body has been rebuilt in a modern style. The remaining steeple has a tower with three stages, buttresses, lancet windows, a clock face, a corbel table, a cornice with gargoyles, and a broach spire with lucarnes.	II
Walsden Infants School; 53.69463°N 2.09886°W	—	c. 1875	The school is in stone and has a slate roof with coped gables and moulded kneelers. There is one storey, and the school consists of a hall range and gabled cross-wings. The windows are mullioned and transomed. In the central projection is an eight-light window with a hood mould and above it is a recessed tablet with Saint Peter's keys.	II
Boundary stone at NGR SD 945198; 53.67292°N 2.08458°W		Late 19th century	The boundary stone stands on the west side of Rochdale Road (A6033 road) and marked the boundary between Littleborough Urban District and the Borough of Todmorden. It is divided down the middle and inscribed with the names of the areas.	II
Boundary stone at NGR SD 887245; 53.71750°N 2.17168°W		Late 19th century	The boundary stone stands on the south side of the A681 road and marked the boundary between the Boroughs of Todmorden and Bacup. It is divided down the middle and inscribed with the names of the boroughs.	II
Boundary stone at NGR SD 943193; 53.67074°N 2.08654°W		Late 19th century	The stone marked the boundary between the Borough of Todmorden and Littleborough Urban District. It has an arched head and divided into two sections, each inscribed with one of the two regions.	II
The Longstoup; 53.70476°N 2.05135°W		Unknown	A standing stone on a former packhorse track.	II
