= South Pennines Regional Park =

Proposed national park in Northern England

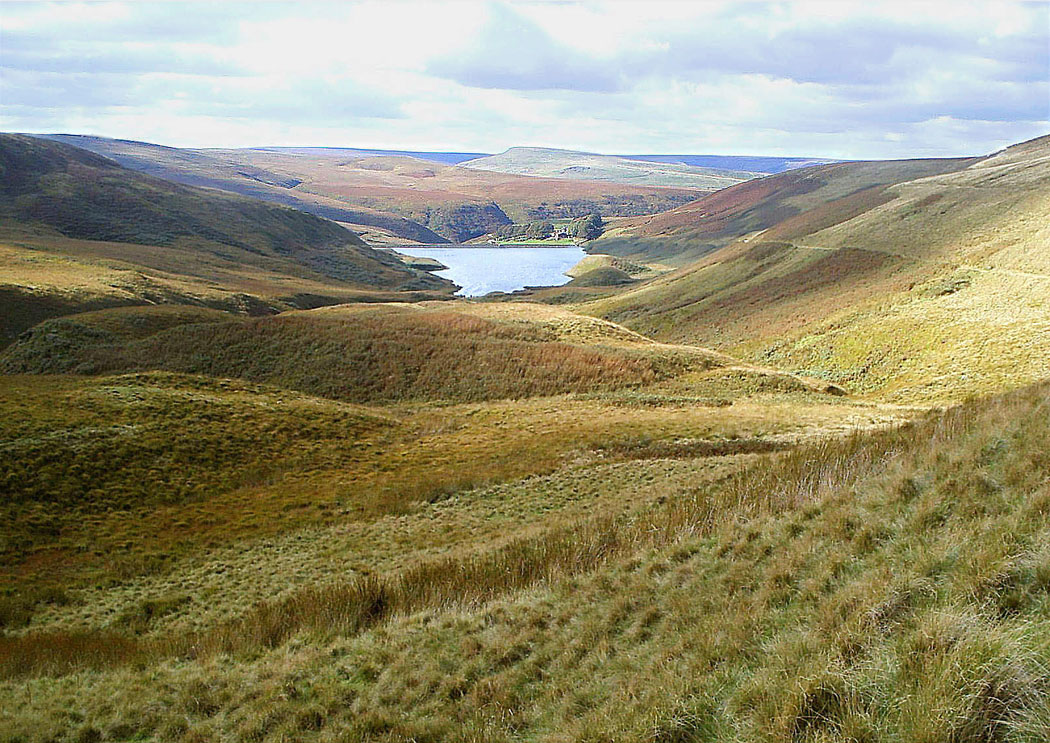
- The Wessenden Valley south of Marsden in West Yorkshire
- Interactive map of South Pennines Regional Park
- Coordinates: 53.740°N 2.058°W
- Area: 460 square miles (1,200 km^{2})
- Elevation: 1,873 feet (571 m)
- Created: 2021
- Website: Official website

The South Pennines Regional Park (or South Pennines Park) was a proposed national park that would cover the South Pennines area in Northern England, encompassing parts of Greater Manchester, Lancashire and West Yorkshire. It would also adjoin the borders of two existing national parks; the Yorkshire Dales in the north and the Peak District in the south. The area was named as a prospective national park in the 1940s when the idea of creating national parks was being carried forward, but it was never given the same status as the Peak District, North York Moors or the Yorkshire Dales.

The South Pennines Regional Park was championed by many agencies and charities. Pennine Prospects were awarded Heritage Lottery Funding in 2018. In September 2021, the park was launched under a "self-declaration" scheme, though its status is not recognised by the Department for Environment, Food and Rural Affairs.

The organisation behind the proposal closed at the end of 2023. The South Pennines is the only upland area of England without any designated protection framework.

== History ==
In 1947, Sir Arthur Hobhouse delivered a report to the UK Government on the establishment of National Parks and Areas of Outstanding Natural Beauty (AONB). This in turn led to the passing of the National Parks and Access to the Countryside Act of 1949. The creation of the parks and AONBs was seen as a "recreational gift to Britain's returning Second World War service men and women". By 2018, Britain had 15 National Parks and England had 34 AONBs; ten of the National parks are in England, Wales has three and Scotland has two. In the original list drawn up by Hobhouse, but not published, was the area of the South Pennines. However, it was decided that due to the industrial heritage of the region, it would not be appropriate to list the site for protection under either National Park status or as an AONB.

In May 2018, the Environment Secretary, Michael Gove, announced a review into the National Parks. Writing in The Telegraph, Gove stated that the intent was to review their function but not to "diminish the protection of natural areas, but to strengthen it in the face of present-day challenges." This could lead to new national parks or certain AONBs being upgraded in their status.

The South Pennines is a large upland area that extends from East Lancashire across West Yorkshire and touches Greater Manchester and the Peak District in the south. The region is the only upland area in England without national park status or designated protected framework although various individual sections have some protected status (such as the South Pennine Moors Special Area of Conservation (SAC) which covers more than 65,000 hectares (160,000 acres) and describes moorland which has 9,000 year-old peatlands). The South Pennines has 15 Sites of Special Scientific Interest (SSSIs) and 2,604 miles (4,190 km) of paths and bridleways including two national trails (the Pennine Way and the Pennine Bridleway). After the announcement by Gove, Pennine Prospects, (Note: Pennine Prospects was set up in 2005 to promote the South Pennines area and brings together six local authorities (Bradford, Calderdale, Kirklees, Lancashire, Oldham and Rochdale) with other interested stakeholders (Natural England, Historic England and the National Trust) and the major landowners (United Utilities and Yorkshire Water).) a rural regeneration agency, urged the committee overseeing the National Parks review to not forget the South Pennines. Pennine Prospects achieved Local Nature Partnership (LNP) status in 2012; the boundary of the LNP will mirror that of the National Character Area profile designated as the South Pennines.

In 2018 Pennine Prospects was awarded Heritage Lottery Funding (HLF) for training and providing information in the designation of a Regional Park, the first of its kind in the country. Pennine Prospects stated before the National Parks review that rather than wait for government approval in a designated status, they would work from the ground up to achieve regional park status. As part of this process, the park was announced in September 2021, under a "self-declaration" scheme, though without official recognition from the Department for Environment, Food and Rural Affairs (DEFRA). The self-designation scheme would see the park adjoin the borders of the Peak District National Park in the south, and the Yorkshire Dales National Park in the north. The highest point is in the park is 1,873 feet (571 m), and it covers an area of 460 square miles (1,200 km^{2}). The population living inside that area of 660,000; more than twice the resident population of all of England's national parks combined. The park is also accessible within 30 minutes to 8 million people. According to the chief executive of the park, it has 53 railway stations and four motorways within its boundaries.

The organisation behind the proposal closed at the end of 2023.

== Settlements ==
According to Pennine Prospects and the National Character Area No. 36, the South Pennines Regional Park would encompass the following villages, towns and areas.

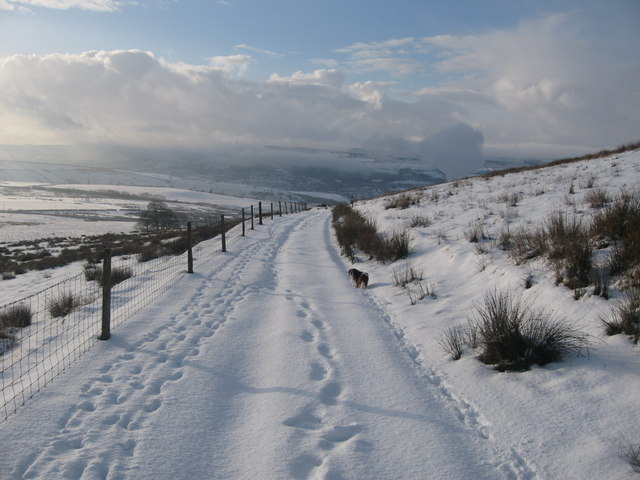
Rossendale Way Footpath

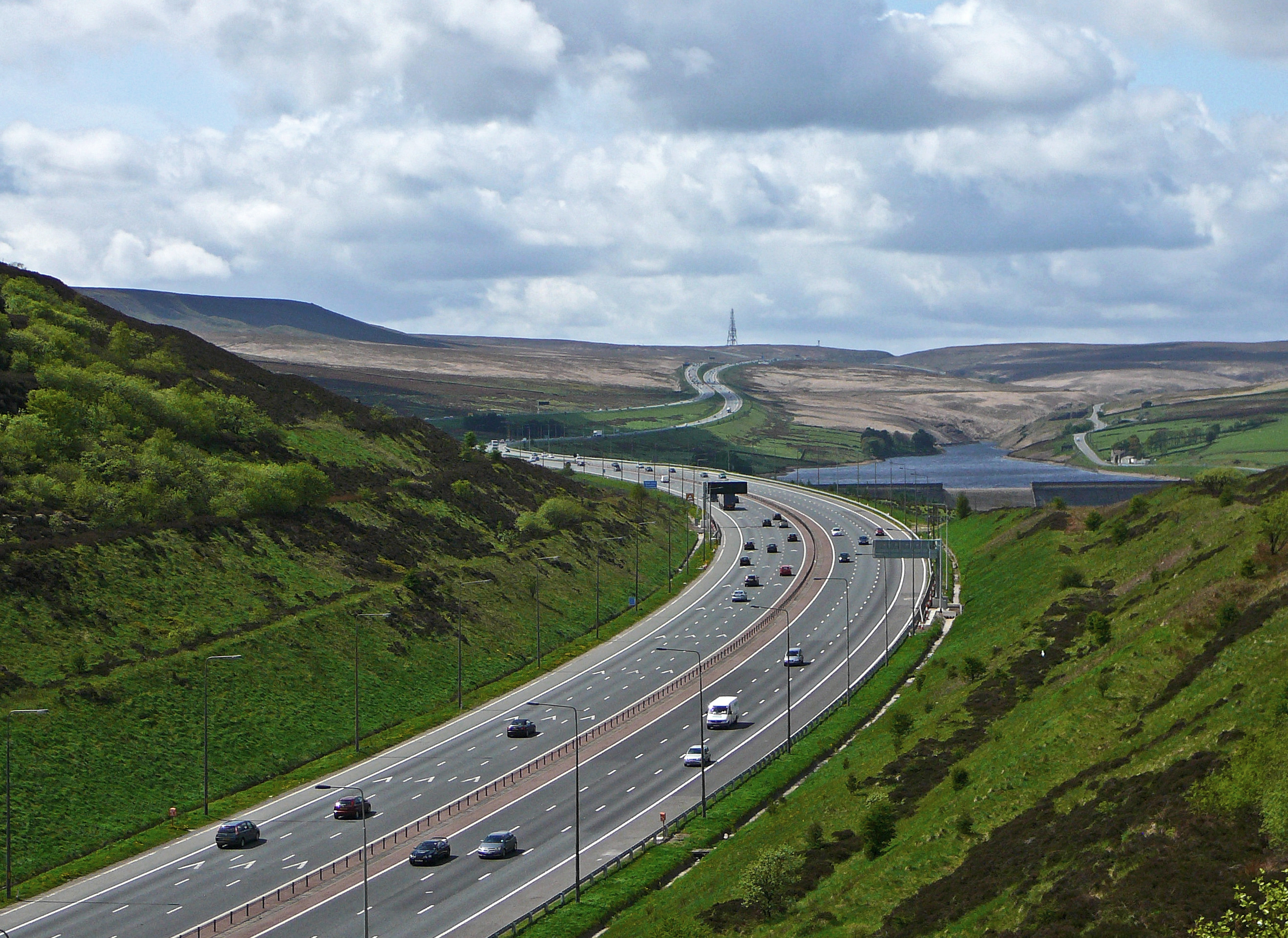
M62 westbound, with Booth Wood Reservoir, and the summit of the M62 in the distance

=== Lancashire ===
- Bacup
- Chorley
- Darwen
- Haslingden
- Rawtenstall
- Whitworth
- Wycoller

=== Greater Manchester ===
- Delph
- Diggle
- Greenfield
- Horwich
- Littleborough
- Milnrow
- Ramsbottom
- Saddleworth
- Shaw
- Tottington
- Uppermill

=== West Yorkshire ===
- Aireborough
- Baildon
- Haworth
- Hebden Bridge
- Holmfirth
- Ilkley
- Keighley
- Marsden
- Meltham
- Oxenhope
- Queensbury
- Ripponden
- Silsden
- Slaithwaite
- Sowerby Bridge
- Thornton
- Todmorden

=== North Yorkshire ===
- Skipton
