= Ilkley Moor =

Moorland in West Yorkshire, England

Coordinates: 53.915°N 1.815°W

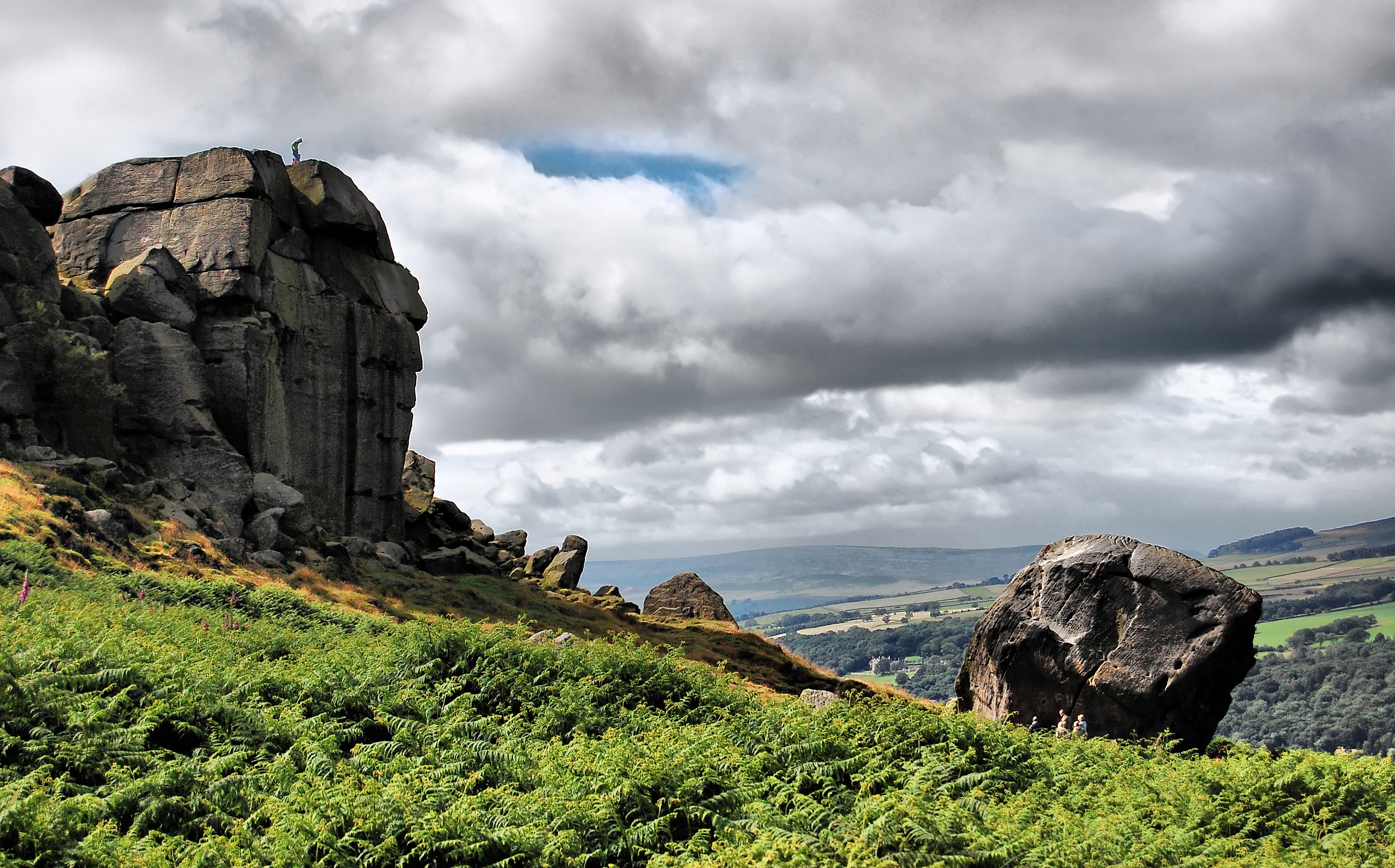
- Cow and Calf rocks

Highest point
- Elevation: 402 m (1,319 ft)
- Prominence: c. 244 metres (801 ft)
- Parent peak: Thorpe Fell Top
- Listing: Marilyn

Geography
- Location: West Yorkshire, England
- OS grid: SE114452
- Topo map: OS Landranger 104

Ilkley Moor is part of Rombalds Moor, the moorland between Ilkley and Keighley in West Yorkshire, England. The moor, which rises to 402 m (1,319 ft) above sea level, is the inspiration for the Yorkshire "county anthem" On Ilkla Moor Baht 'at (dialect for 'on Ilkley Moor without a hat').

== Geology ==
During the Carboniferous period (325 million years ago), Ilkley Moor was part of a sea-level swampy area fed by meandering river channels coming from the north. The layers in the eroded bank faces of stream gullies in the area represent sea levels with various tides depositing different sorts of sediment. Over a long period, the sediments were cemented and compacted into hard rock layers. Geological forces lifted and tilted the strata a little towards the south-east, producing many small fractures, or faults.

Since the end of the Carboniferous period more than a thousand metres of coal-bearing rocks have been completely removed from the area by erosion. During the last million years, Ice Age glaciers modified the shape of the Wharfe valley, deepening it, smoothing it, and leaving behind glacial debris.

The millstone grit not only gives character to the town of Ilkley but gives the area its acid soils, heather moors, soft water, and rocky scars.

== History ==
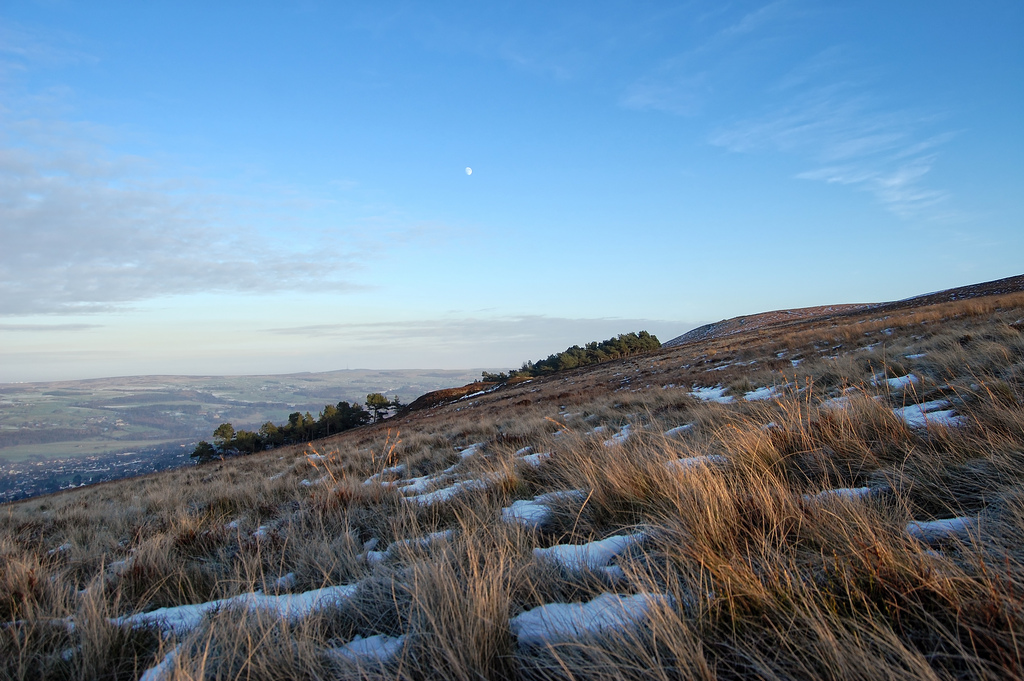
Ilkley Moor on a clear evening as the daylight fades

To the north, where the moor drops steeply towards the village of Ben Rhydding, a satellite of the town of Ilkley, are two millstone grit rock climbing areas: Rocky Valley and Ilkley Quarry.

Ilkley Quarry is the site of the famous "Cow and Calf", a large rock formation consisting of an outcrop and boulder, also known as Hangingstone Rocks. The rocks are made of millstone grit, a variety of sandstone, and are so named because one is large, with the smaller one sitting close to it, like a cow and calf. Legend has it that there was once also a "bull", but that was quarried for stone during the spa town boom that Ilkley was part of in the 19th century. However, none of the local historians have provided any evidence of the Bull's existence.

According to legend, the Calf was split from the Cow when the giant Rombald was fleeing an enemy and stamped on the rock as he leapt across the valley. The enemy, it is said, was his angry wife. She dropped the stones held in her skirt to form the local rock formation The Skirtful of Stones.

In July 2006 a major fire on the moor left between a quarter and half of it destroyed.

The BBC Television series Gunpowder (2017) used Ilkley Moor as a location.

=== Swastika Stone and other antiquities ===
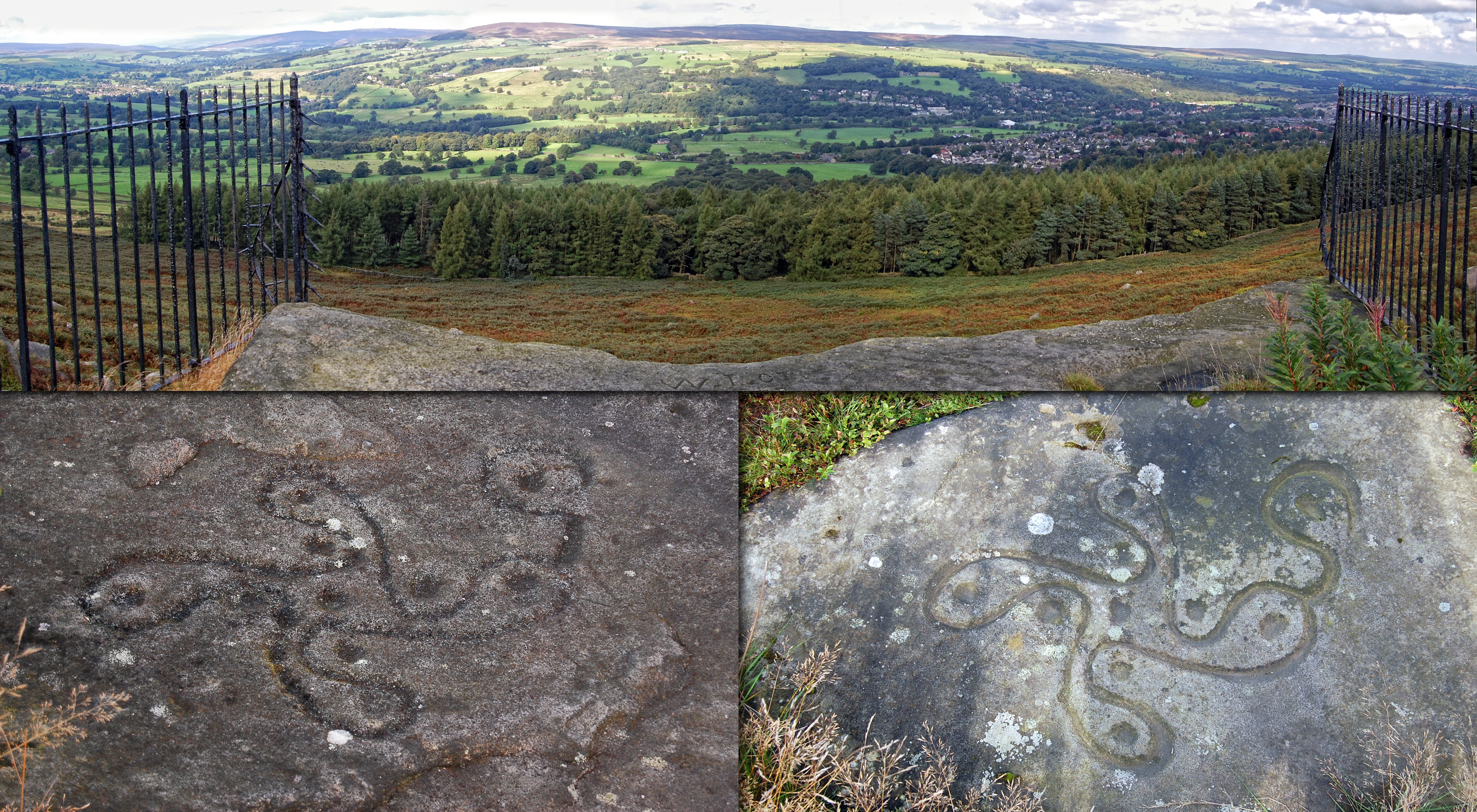
A photograph of the Swastika Stone alongside its replica carving and the view it overlooks from Woodhouse Crag

On the Woodhouse Crag on the northern edge of Ilkley Moor is a swastika-shaped pattern engraved in a stone, known as the Swastika Stone, also referred to as a fylfot. The image at the bottom-right of the picture is a 20th-century replica; the original carving can be seen at the bottom left.

This stone is just one of many carved rocks on the moor; well-known others include the 'Badger Stone', 'Nebstone', and 'St Margaret's Stones'. These are earthfast boulders, large flat slabs, or prominent rocks that have cups, rings, and grooves cut into them and that are thought to date from either the late Neolithic or the Bronze Age. While some carvings consist of simple cups, others, such as the Badger Stone, Hanging Stones, and the Panorama Rocks, have a complex series of patterns (or motifs) combining many different elements. Rombald's Moor has the second-highest concentration of ancient carved stones in Europe, with carvings as far away as Skipton Moor. There is also a small stone circle known as The Twelve Apostles.

=== "The Ilkley Moor Alien" sighting ===
On 1 December 1987, Phillip Spencer, a retired policeman, saw and photographed what he believed was an alien being on the moor. He said he saw the strange creature rush up the hill and give a signal to him with one of its arms as if telling him not to approach. He later saw a dome-topped craft at the top of the hill after following the being which shot into the air at a blinding speed. The Daily Telegraph included this event in a 2011 list of "Top 10 UFO incidents in the UK".

== Conservation ==
The moor forms part of the South Pennine Moors Site of Special Scientific Interest (SSSI). It also forms part of the South Pennine Moors Special Protection Area (SPA) and Special Area of Conservation (SAC).

The Friends of Ilkley Moor group was founded in 2008 and works with partners to preserve the moor.

== Grouse shooting controversy ==
In 2008, Bradford Metropolitan District Council leased the grouse shooting rights for Ilkley Moor. This move led to controversy because of concerns about its impact on wildlife, walking, leisure and local tourism. In January 2018, the majority Labour group on the Council resolved not to renew the rights, and the grouse shooting ceased in April 2018.

== See also ==
- Ilkley Tarn, located on the moor
