= Ilkley Tarn =

Tarn in West Yorkshire, England

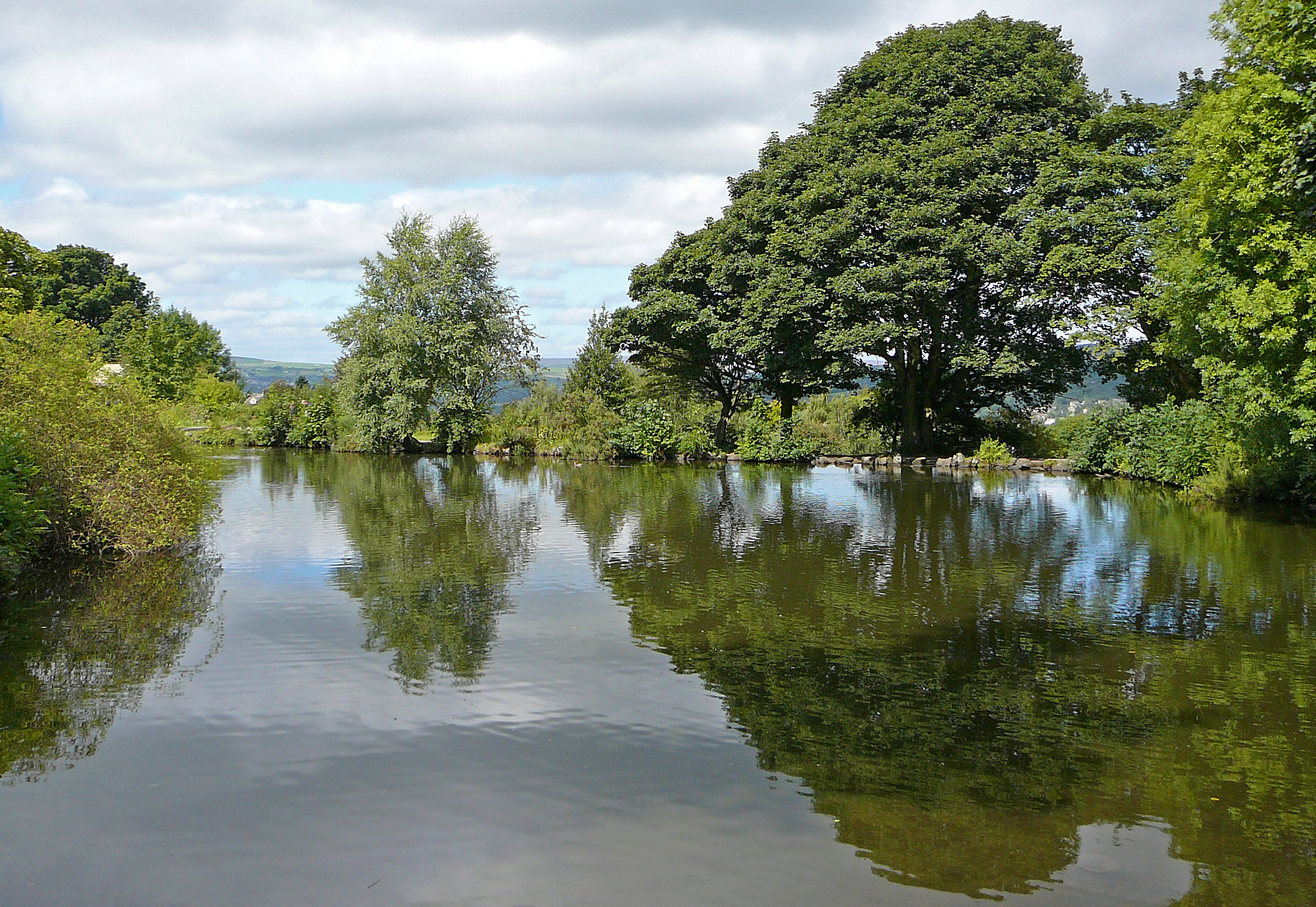
- Interactive map of Ilkley Tarn
- Location: Ilkley, West Yorkshire
- Coordinates: 53.91895°N 1.81601°W
- Type: Tarn
- Basin countries: England
- Surface elevation: 160 metres (520 ft)

Ilkley Tarn is an artificial lake on moorland south-west of the town of Ilkley, in West Yorkshire, England. The tarn, which is 160 metres (520 ft) above sea level, is noted as being one of the places where Emmeline Pankhurst addressed a crowd of suffragettes in 1908, and within the South Pennine Moors SSSI, and the Bradford Pennine Gateway national nature reserve.

== History ==
Originally the tarn was part of a natural moorland lake known as Craig, Craig Tarn, (or Crag Dam), possibly a morainic lake, which supplied water to two mills lower down in Ilkley via a watercourse from the dam known as Mill Ghyll (shown as Mill Race on old mapping). Water entered the old tarn via Blackstone Beck into the eastern end of the tarn. It was converted into a recreational lake in the 1870s, with a shelter and a fountain in the middle, but it retained the name of a tarn. One writer states it was adapted in 1873 being "..enlarged and beautified..". The people who ran the Craiglands Hydro to the north (but lower down the hill) of the tarn, complained that the project was not completed to a sufficient standard for retaining water during times of heavy rainfall; their fears were realised in 1874 when the banks of the tarn gave way, flooding the hydro below.

In 1908, Emmeline Pankhurst addressed a gathering of the Women's Social and Political Union at the tarn. By then, the area around the tarn regularly hosted talks and band concerts, with a bandstand being built at some point. The travelling troupe The Pierrots also performed at the tarn in the late 19th century. When it was cold enough to freeze the ice, people would use the tarn as an ad-hoc ice rink, which was made easier as the tarn had lighting erected around it.

The tarn is located at 160 metres (520 ft) above sea level and has a footpath that runs around the edge of the water which extends for 500 metres (1,600 ft) which was asphalted in 1925. The pagoda-style shelter was renovated and re-roofed in the early 1990s and again in 2009.

The problem of water from the tarn accessing the sewer network, and then entering the River Wharfe has been discussed between the local authorities, the Environment Agency and Yorkshire Water. This was against the backdrop of creating a safe wild-swimming zone on the River Wharfe near Ilkley. Additionally, Yorkshire Water want the water exiting the tarn to not enter the sewage works as it can be overloaded with wastewater from other sources. The tarn is located within the South Pennine Moors SSSI, and in the Bradford Gateway National Nature Reserve.

== Wildlife ==
A request to stop feeding ducks at the tarn was made by the Friends of Ilkley Moor in March 2025. The ducks, which numbered over 100, had polluted the water so much the lake was "devoid of aquatic life." However, the Ilkley Moor Management Plan (2016-2026) encourages the breeding of wildfowl on the small island in the middle of the tarn, so much so that it recommends removing the stepping stones across the water and onto the island. The Yorkshire folk song On Ilkla Moor Baht 'at mentions ducks; it has been theorised that the ducks on Craig Tarn were the ones referred to in the song. The Friends of Ilkley Moor have put forward plans to allow water ingress and egress, so as to oxygenate the water.

== See also ==
- Yeadon Tarn
