= Nebstone =

Coordinates: 53°54′49.1″N 1°50′35.9″W

The Nebstone is a notable rock found close to the Swastika Stone on the northern edge of Ilkley Moor in West Yorkshire, England. It has the appearance of the lid of a grand piano, and is located a few hundred yards to the west of the Keighley Road. Like many of the rocks on Ilkley moor, it bears evidence for cup and ring marks, although for such a prominent rock it has relatively few possible cup marks.

There is no real consensus as to the actual purpose of the cup and ring marked stones on Ilkley Moor although it is postulated that they were used to mark ownership of land or mark the location of settlements. They have been dated somewhere between 3500 and 2500 years old.
