= South Pennines =

Region of moorland and hills in northern England

Coordinates: 53.621°N 1.741°W

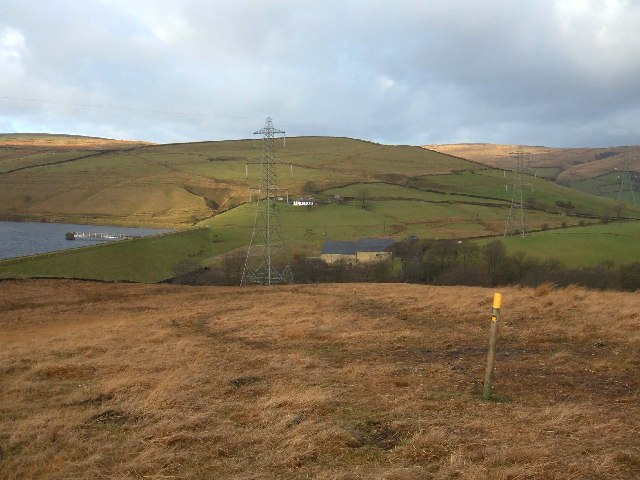
Footpath across Inchfield Moor

The South Pennines is a region of moorland and hill country in northern England lying towards the southern end of the Pennines. In the west it includes the Rossendale Valley and the West Pennine Moors. It is bounded by the Greater Manchester conurbation and East Lancashire in the west and the Bowland Fells and Yorkshire Dales to the north. To the east it is fringed by the towns of West Yorkshire whilst to the south it is bounded by the Peak District. The rural South Pennine Moors constitutes both a Site of Special Scientific Interest and Special Area of Conservation.

== National character area ==
The Southern Pennines National Character Area defined by Natural England includes the West Pennine Moors and is a landscape of broad moorland, flat-topped hills and fields enclosed by dry stone walls. Settlements built from local gritstone occupy river valleys with wooded sides. Peat soils and blanket bog on the moors store carbon while high rainfall fills many reservoirs supplying water to the adjacent conurbations. The area is important for recreation having open access areas, footpaths and historic packhorse routes.

== Geology ==
The area is almost wholly formed from multiple layers of sedimentary rock dating from the Carboniferous period. The oldest of these are the limestones and associated mudstones which outcrop in the northernmost part of the region, though which are thought to underlie the entire area at depth. These are assigned to the Craven Group. Overlying these and occurring widely across the region are the mudstones and sandstones of the Millstone Grit Group. Many of the sandstones, particularly the coarser-grained ones are commonly referred to as gritstones or 'grits'. The Millstone Grit is in turn overlain by the end Carboniferous Coal Measures which in this region are all assigned to the Pennine Lower Coal Measures Formation. It comprises mudstones, siltstones and sandstones and of course coal seams. Coal Measures rocks occur along the eastern and western margins of the region, on either side of the 'Pennine Anticline', and across much of the West Pennines.

== Geography ==
Although precise definitions vary, the South Pennines mostly cover the Pennine area between the Yorkshire Dales, Bowlands Fells and Peak District. It is separated from the Yorkshire Dales to the north by the Aire Gap, the Bowland Fells to the north west by the Ribble Valley and the Peak District to the south by the Tame Valley, Standedge and Holme Valley. The West Lancashire Coastal Plain and Greater Manchester conurbation are both to the west while the West Yorkshire conurbation is to the east.

Settlements within the South Pennines include Addingham, Ilkley and Otley in the north, as well as Bingley, Keighley, Haworth and Oxenhope. Halifax, Sowerby Bridge, Hebden Bridge and Todmorden are in the Calder Valley. These also include Marsden, Slaithwaite and Meltham in the south-east, Darwen, Haslingden and Rawtenstall in Lancashire, and Greenfield, Horwich, Ramsbottom, Oldham, Rochdale, Wardle, and Littleborough in Greater Manchester.

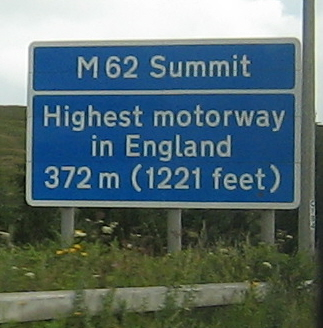
M62 summit sign at Windy Hill

Moorland in the South Pennines includes Rombalds Moor, Rishworth Moor, Haworth Moor, Turton Moor and Castleshaw Moor. The highest point of the M62 motorway, the highest motorway in England, is at 1,221 feet (372 m) on Windy Hill near junction 22.

The rivers Aire, Calder and Colne drain the area to the east and the Roch and Irwell to the west. The Calder Valley provides a low-level route for road, railway and the Rochdale Canal between Greater Manchester and Lancashire in the west and West Yorkshire to the east. The Huddersfield Narrow Canal and the Manchester to Huddersfield railway pass through the Standedge Tunnels and the A62 road crosses the moorland at Standedge. The Leeds and Liverpool Canal passes through Bingley and Keighley en route to Skipton.

Natural England describes the South Pennine moorlands as the Watershed Landscape where the area's high rainfall fills a multitude of reservoirs. The South Pennines and its fringe has a population of more than a million people. Woodland covers about 4% of the terrain mostly on steep valley sides.

== History ==
The South Pennines provide evidence of Mesolithic, the late Bronze Age and Iron Age findings. The Romans built roads and built forts in Ilkley and at Castleshaw. They also dug coal which was further exploited especially during the Industrial Revolution in the late 18th and early 19th centuries.

Steep-sided valleys with fast flowing streams provided power and water for the area's early mills and factories. Water-powered corn mills and fulling mills were used in medieval times and more fulling mills were built after the mid-16th century as the woollen industry grew. At the end of the 18th century, water powered mills were vital for industrial expansion of the textile industry, initially for spinning cotton, but subsequently for woollens and worsteds.

== Tourism ==
Walking, mountain-biking and horseriding are common pastimes enjoyed in the area. Numerous walking trails have been established including, amongst many others, the Calderdale Way and the Bronte Way. The long-established Pennine Way passes through the area. The South Pennines Walk & Ride Festival which takes place annually in September is a two-week celebration of the area's landscape. Typical events include guided walks, mountain bike rides, horse rides, orienteering events and evening talks by noted speakers.

== Principal summits ==
The following hills in the region have more than 30 metres of topographic prominence and are over 300 metres in height. The southern boundary with the Peak District is taken to be Standedge and the watercourses flowing from either side of it, although this is somewhat arbitrary.

1. Boulsworth Hill (517.7m)
2. Way Stone Edge (481.6m)
3. Hoof Stones Height (479.3m)
4. Hail Storm Hill (476.7m)
5. Blackstone Edge (474m)
6. Hameldon (468.1m)
7. Withins Height (459m)
8. Winter Hill (456.5m)
9. Freeholds Top (454.1m)
10. Nab Hill (451m)
11. Thieveley Pike (449m)
12. Little Wolf Stones (443.3m)
13. Carr and Craggs Moor (441m)
14. Cowpe Lowe (440m)
15. Rishworth Moor (435m)
16. Blake Moor (422m)
17. Bull Hill (417.9m)
18. Manshead End (417m)
19. Great Hameldon (409m)
20. Soil Hill (408.8m)
21. Cartridge Hill (402m)
22. Stoodley Pike (402m)
23. Brown Wardle Hill (401m)
24. Cribden Hill (401m)
25. Crompton Moor (398m)
26. Spitlers Edge (392m)
27. Worts Hill (391m)
28. White Hill (389m)
29. Pinhaw Beacon (388m)
30. Crow Hill (383m)
31. Wholestone Moor (380m)
32. Badger Edge (379m)
33. Rushy Hill (Blackburn) (377m)
34. Hawshaw Hill (363m)
35. Sheep Hill (359m)
36. Crown Point (350m)
37. Steeton Moor (350m)
38. Crow Edge (349m)
39. Harrop Edge (Delph) (348m)
40. Wharmton (348m)
41. Turton Heights (343m)
42. Walton's Monument (338m)
43. Swales Moor (335.6m)
44. Pike Law (332m)
45. Rushton's Height (324m)
46. Rushy Hill (Rochdale) (317m)
47. Dick Hill (308m)
48. Holly Bank (308m)
49. Harrop Edge (Bradford) (306m)

== See also ==
- South Pennine Moors
- South Pennines Regional Park
