= Swastika Stone =

Stone adorned with a design that resembles a swastika

Coordinates: 53°55′08″N 1°51′43″W

Swastika Stone design

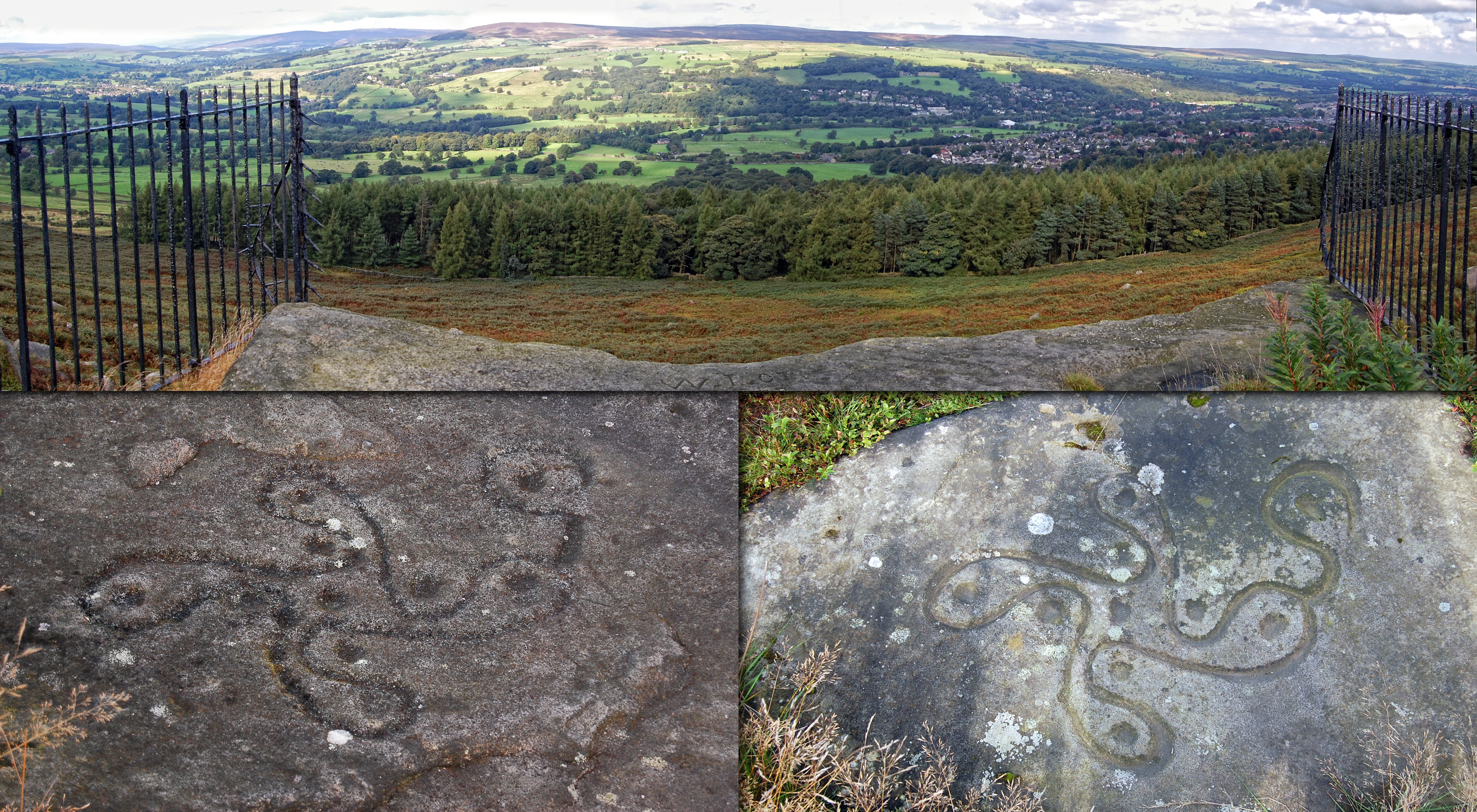
A photograph of the original stone, its replica carving and the view it overlooks from Woodhouse Crag.

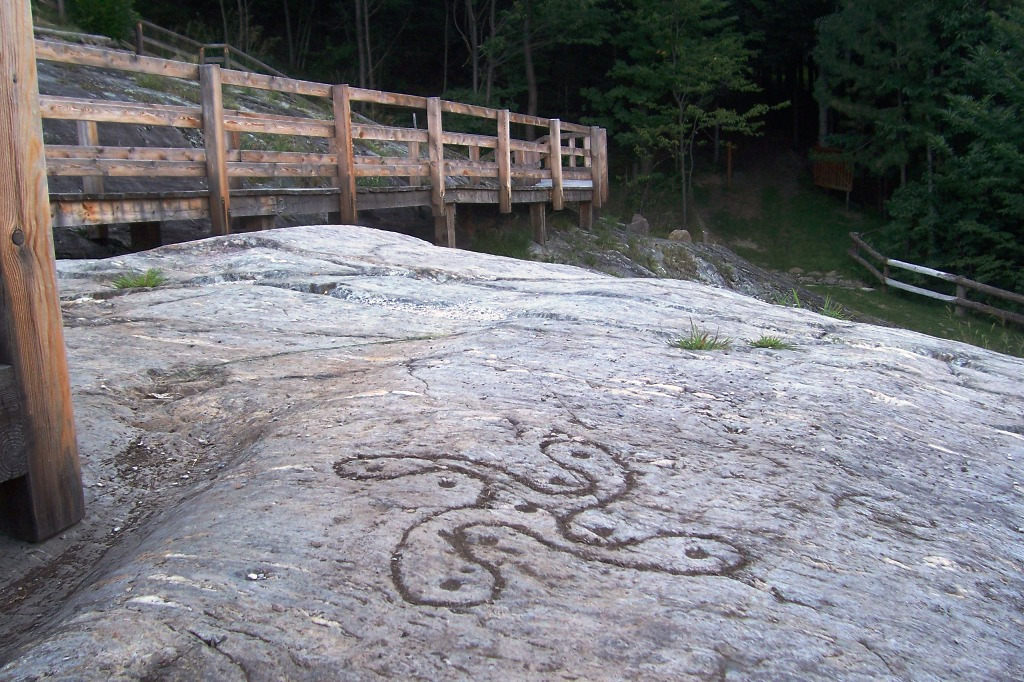
The Ilkley Moor design is similar to the Camunian rose of Sellero, Italy

The Swastika Stone is a stone adorned with a swastika, located on the Woodhouse Crag on the northern edge of Ilkley Moor in West Yorkshire, England. It is the only one of its kind known in Britain. The design has a double outline with four curved arms and an attached S-shape, each enclosing a so-called "cup" mark. Similar cup and ring marks can be found on other stones nearby.

The stone has not been verifiably dated. The academic consensus suggests it to have been carved sometime around the Neolithic or early Bronze Age, although Frank Elgee suggests that the design indicates a late Iron Age origin.

== See also ==
- Camunian rose – Prehistoric symbol from the petroglyphs of Valcamonica
- Fylfot – Anglo-Saxon and heraldic symbol
- Germanic pre-Christian use of the swastika
- Lauburu – Basque swastika
- Rock Drawings in Valcamonica
- Western use of the swastika in the early 20th century
