= Yeadon Tarn =

Lake in West Yorkshire, England

- The Moor Dam
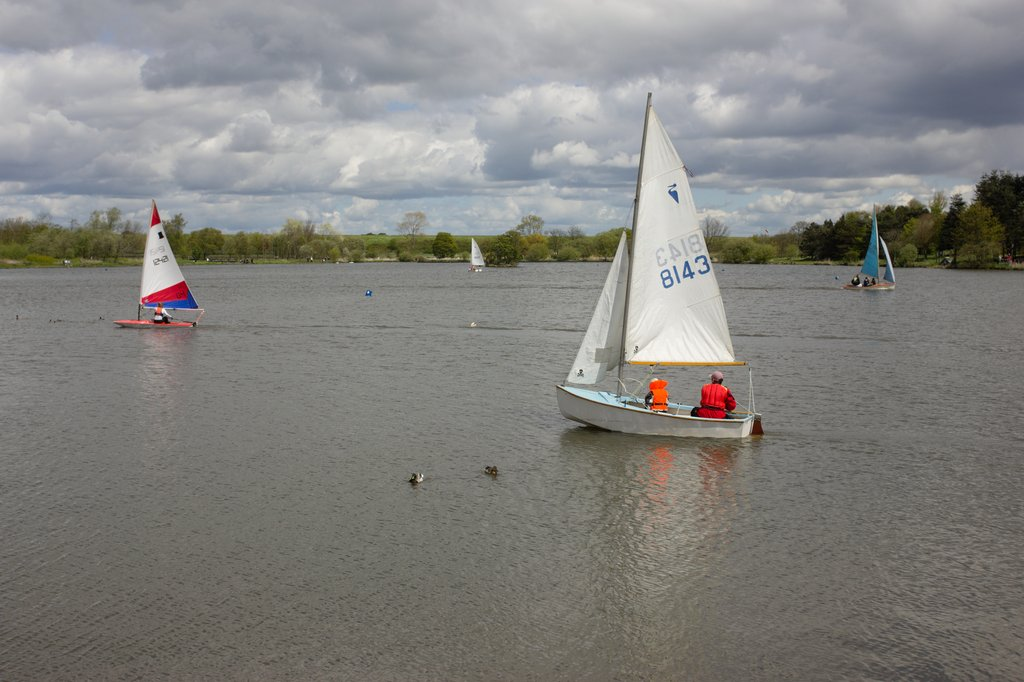
- Sailing Boats on Yeadon Tarn

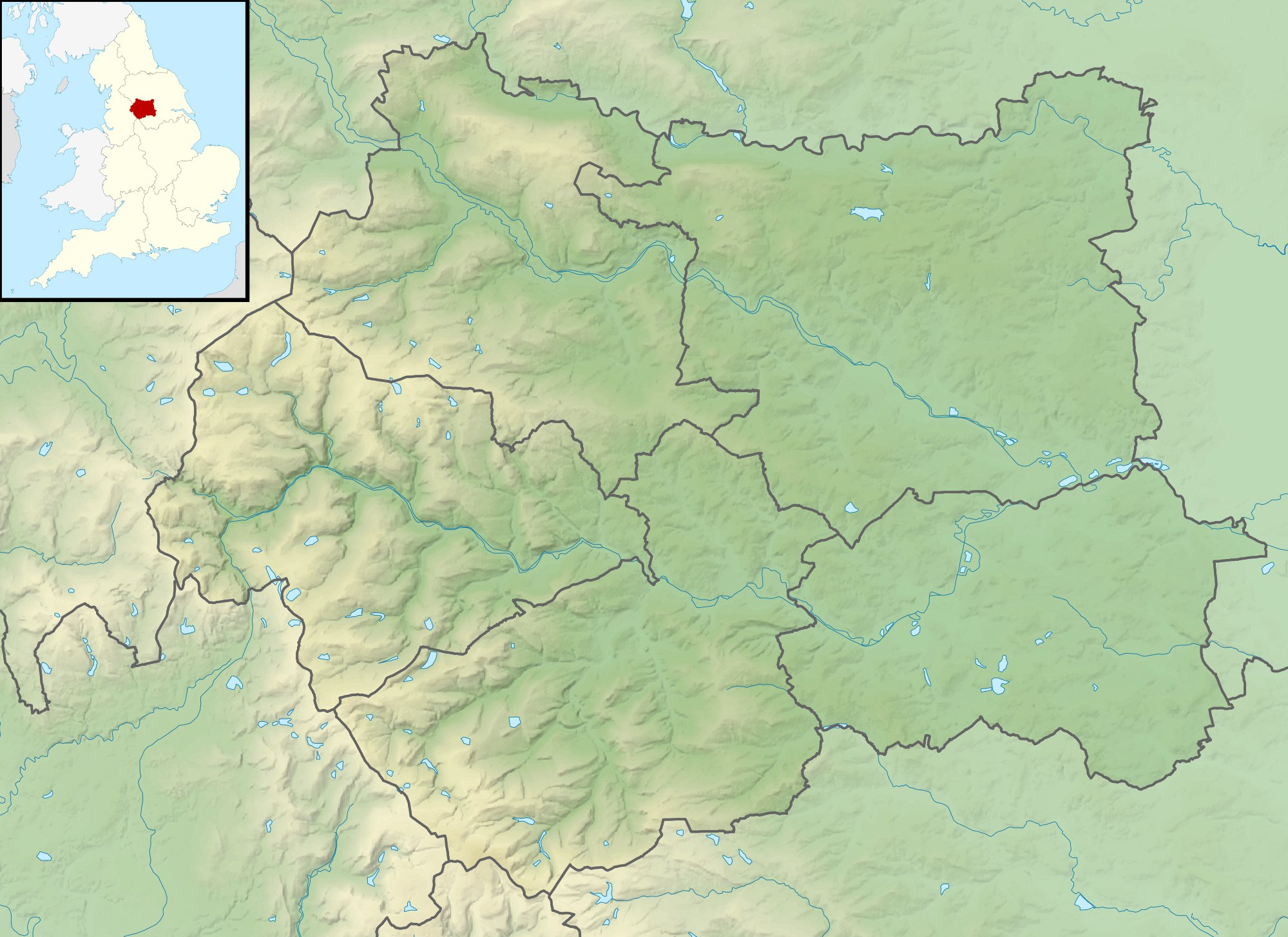
- Location within West Yorkshire
- Location: Yeadon, West Yorkshire
- Coordinates: 53.868°N 1.674°W
- Type: Lake
- Primary outflows: Yeadon Beck
- Catchment area: 68 hectares (170 acres)
- Basin countries: England
- Surface area: 7 hectares (17 acres)
- Max. depth: 3.5 metres (11 ft)
- Water volume: 237,841 cubic metres (8,399,300 cu ft)
- Surface elevation: 196 metres (643 ft)

Yeadon Tarn is a small lake in Yeadon, West Yorkshire, England. The lake, which is fed by land drainage, covers an area of 7 hectares (17 acres), and enters the River Aire via Yeadon Beck, which drains from the tarn at is western side. The tarn attracts a wide variety of wildlife and is additionally used for recreational activities. Yeadon Tarn lies between Leeds Bradford Airport to the east, and the town of Yeadon to the west.

== History ==
The tarn at Yeadon is thought to be a natural feature which has been engineered for industrial use. It is recorded in 1354 as Yedonmarre from the Old Norse mær meaning mere, but later being referred to as a pond, then a tarn. The presence of the tarn is recorded due to a land dispute between the monks of Kirkstall Abbey and the locals who worked the land between the tarn and Horsforth (what is now primarily the land occupied by Leeds/Bradford Airport). Maps that pre-date the Industrial Revolution show it as a "fish pond", and later a map from the 1890s shows that water from the tarn was used to fill the mill ponds at the dye works at the south-west side of the tarn. In 1925, Yeadon District Council purchased the dam from a private owner for £2,400. The council tidied the area around the water and built footpaths, but at the time, they renamed it as Yeadon Tarn, when previously, most local people called it Yeadon Dam, or Yeadon Moor Dam. (Note: The presence of the water is thought by some to have influenced the name of the town itself, with the ea of Yeadon being an Anglo-Saxon word for water, and the addition of don meaning town (water-town), but Ekwall and Smith dispute this, stating the Anglo-Saxon ea means water in the sense of a river, which the tarn is too small for.)

The tarn lies between the town of Yeadon and Leeds Bradford Airport, which has its main runway along the north-eastern edge of the tarn.

The lake has formed due to the local geology; whereas the town is built on sandstone and millstone grit, the area underneath the tarn is made from shales overlain with a boulder clay, which allowed the tarn to form. The tarn has a surface area of 7 hectares (17 acres), an average depth of 3.5 metres (11 ft), and is 196 metres (643 ft) above sea level. It is estimated that the tarn holds 237,841 cubic metres (8,399,300 cu ft) of water and drains an area of 68 hectares (170 acres). (Note: Speight mentions the height to be 200 metres (660 ft), but Ordnance Survey mapping seems to suggest that 196 feet (60 m) is more accurate.) Water enters the tarn from the northern/eastern side as land drainage, rather than a named stream. Due to the height above sea level and the lack of current, in winter the tarn regularly freezes over which has provided a space for ice-skaters, with 10,000 visiting in 1933, and in 1885, a curling competition was held on the tarn. The outflow of water drops 3 feet (0.91 m) at the dam head on the south-western side, and forms Yeadon Beck (or Yeadon Gill) which flows westwards and feeds into the River Aire at Esholt. In the late 19th century, the pollution from the beck was second only to Bradford Beck. In the Second World War, the tarn was drained so that it could not be used as a navigational aid for enemy bombers trying to attack the Avro factory north of the airfield; it was allowed to refill between 1945 and 1946.

== Wildlife and recreation ==
In the year 2000, efforts were made by the Environment Agency to improve the tarn for the resident wildlife, which included turning the north bank into a conservation area, and installing windbreak baffles at the south bank to help prevent erosion caused by wave action and wind. The tarn has attracted a variety of wildfowl, notably ducks and geese, which have caused a hazard to aircraft landing and taking off at the adjacent Leeds/Bradford Airport. In 2011, a cull of canada geese was undertaken, due to the air hazard, which was labelled as barbaric by locals. The tarn attracts cormorants, goosanders, mallards, canada geese, and it is known to have signal crayfish present with a programme of trapping initiated in 2015.

The Leeds Sailing and Activity Centre operates from Tarnfield Park (the park that surrounds the lake). Funding was withdrawn from the venture by Leeds City Council, but the sailing has continued with Yeadon Sailing Club. Fishing is a popular past-time at the tarn, particularly for carp, and besides sailing, the water is used by kayakers and model boating enthusiasts.

Tarnfield Park has a car park and the bus number 747 has a regular service alongside an adjacent road.
