= Mankinholes =

Hamlet in West Yorkshire, England

Coordinates: 53.707°N 2.067°W

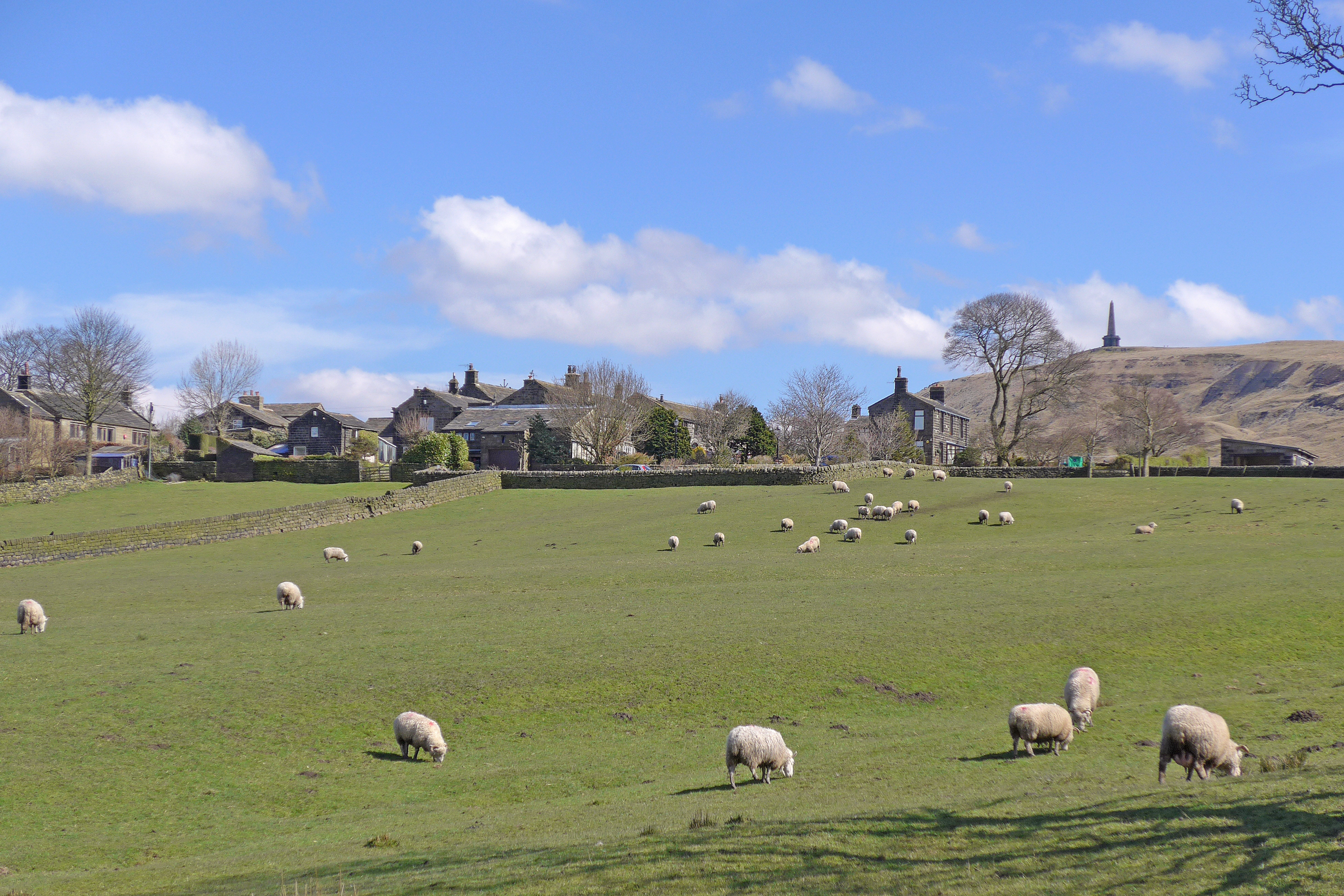
Mankinholes in 2016

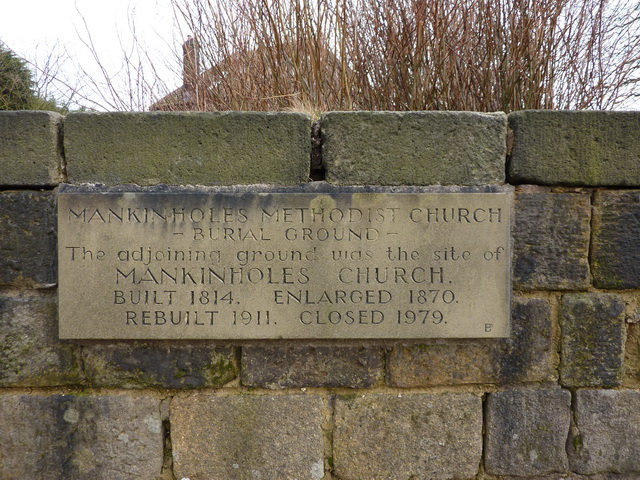
Date stone for Mankinholes Methodist Church

Mankinholes is a hamlet in the Metropolitan Borough of Calderdale, in West Yorkshire, England. It is situated in the Pennines and the nearest town is Todmorden. The hamlet is part of Calder Ward in Calderdale Parish Council. It has a YHA hostel, managed by the larger hostel at nearby Haworth. Mankinholes is the starting point for the popular trek up Stoodley Pike (pike being a North-country term for a mountain or large hill). The hill is surmounted by a 19th-century obelisk, 120 feet (37 m) high, also known as "Stoodley Pike", commemorating the end of the Crimean War.

The name "Mankin" is believed to have Celtic origins, with the OED recording its first meaning as "fierce wild man". The surname Mankin is found in parish records of the township of Langfield and the parish of Halifax. One theory is that the name derives from an area of caverns, inhabited by mankins. A second theory is that the name means "Mancan's Hollow", Mancan being an Irish surname. This would indicate an Irish-Viking settlement.

Mankinholes was an early centre of Wesleyan Methodism. Groups met in farmhouses as early as the late 18th century and the first chapel was built in 1814. This was enlarged in 1870 and rebuilt in 1911. An adjacent Sunday School was built in 1833. Mankinholes Methodist Church closed on 1 July 1979, when the congregation joined with that of Lumbutts Methodist Church, situated midway between the villages of Mankinholes and Lumbutts. The Mankinholes Sunday School building still stands and is now a private house, surrounded by a large graveyard.

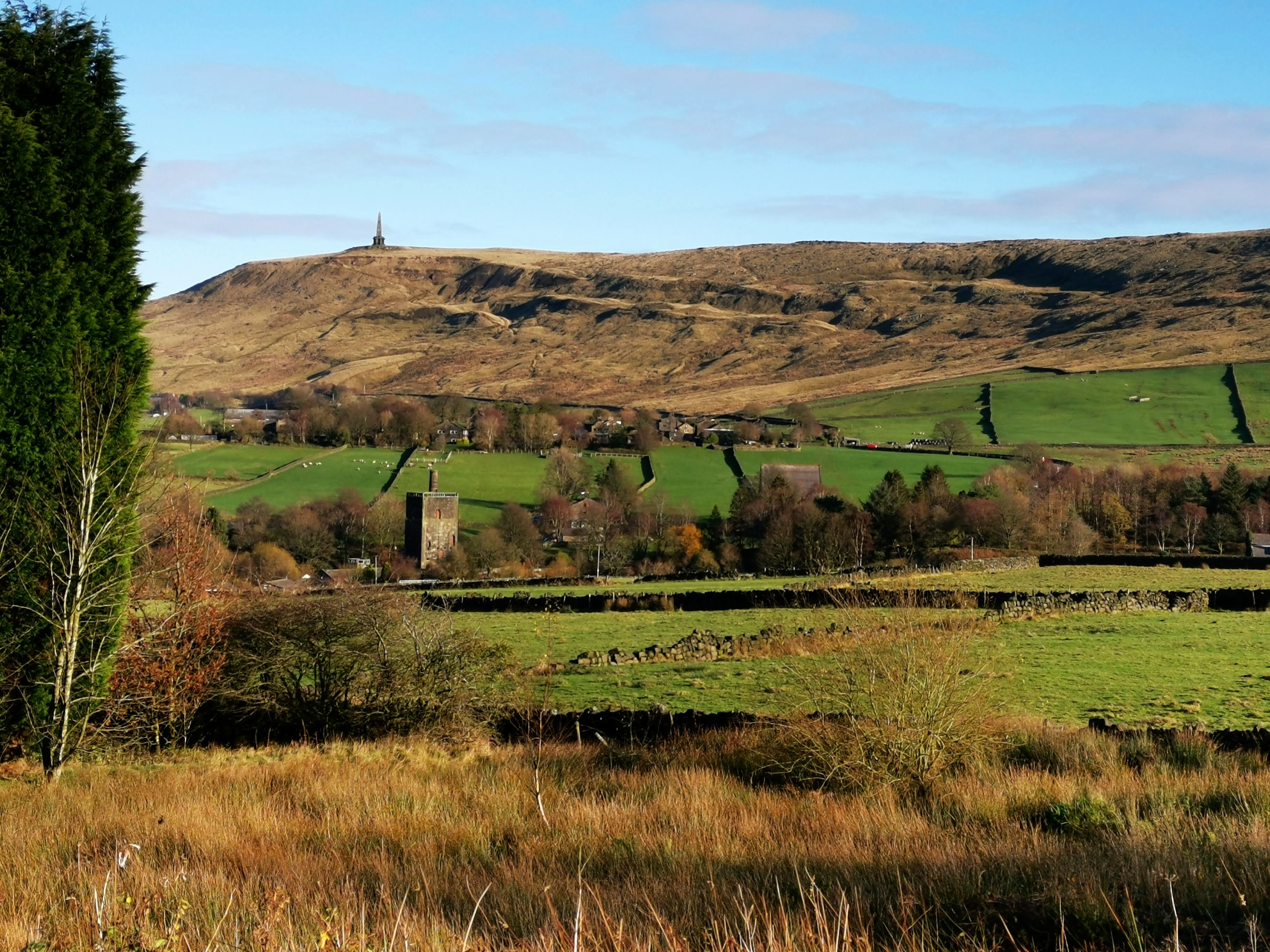
Mankinholes and Lumbutts in November 2020

== Film and television ==
"What the Mankinholes" is a frequently-used expression in the animated comedy television show The Treacle People, which is set in the nearby village of Sabden.

== Other sources ==
- Mitchell, E., History of Mankinholes, 1909
- Wilkinson, R., Methodism in Mankinholes, 1964
- Wilkinson, R., Unto the Hills, 1987
