= Stoodley Pike =

Stone monument in West Yorkshire, England

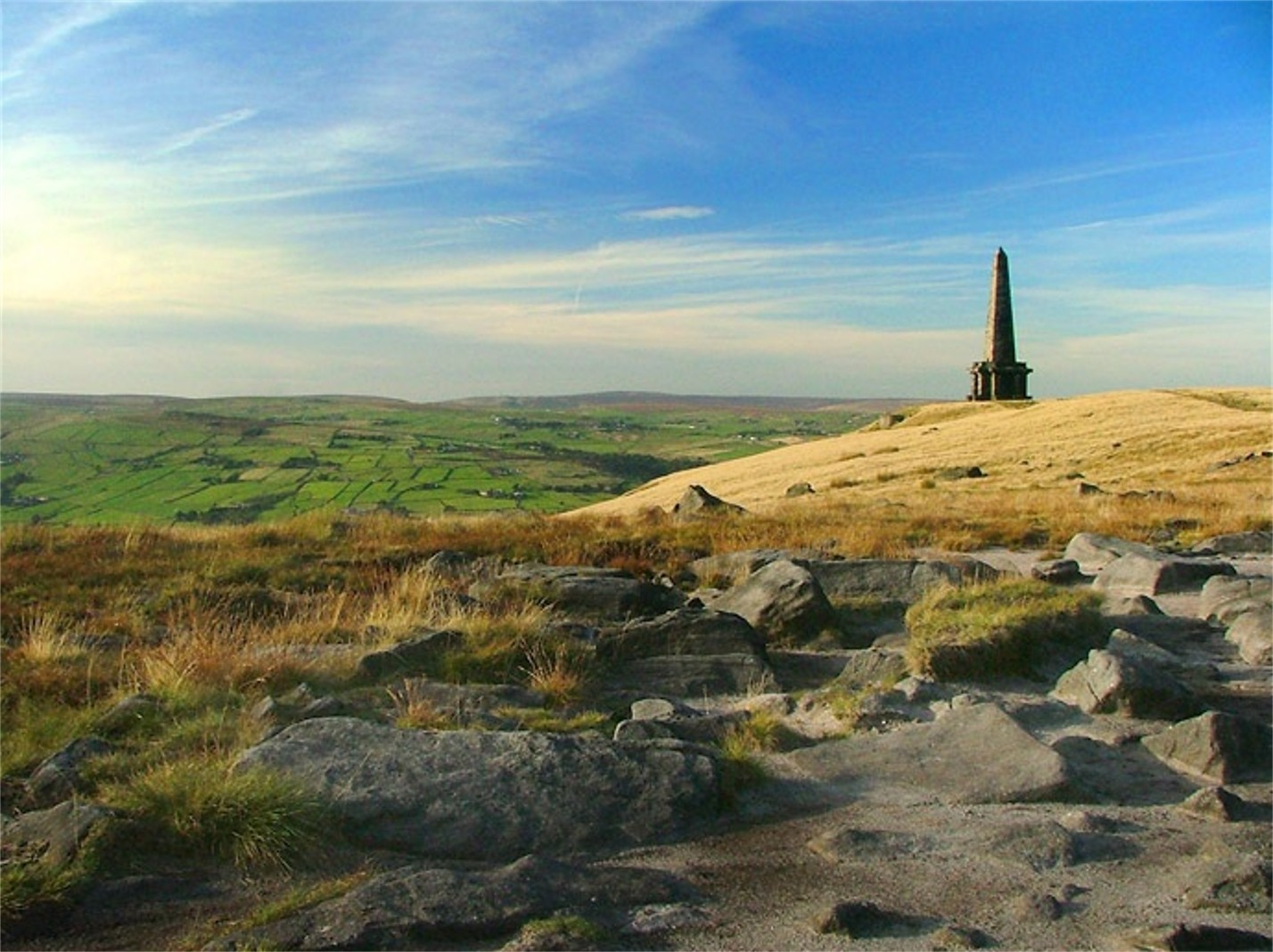
- Mid-distance shot of Stoodley Pike
- Interactive map of Stoodley Pike
- Location: Mankinholes, West Yorkshire, England
- Coordinates: 53.714°N 2.0424°W
- Height: 121 feet (37 m)

Stoodley Pike is a 1,300-foot (400 m) hill in the south Pennines in West Yorkshire in northern England. It is noted for the 121-foot (37 m) Stoodley Pike Monument at its summit, which dominates the skyline above the market town of Todmorden and the moors of the upper Calder Valley. The monument is near the villages of Lumbutts and Mankinholes, West Yorkshire, and was designed in 1854 by local architect John Green, and completed in 1856 at the end of the Crimean War.

The monument replaced an earlier structure, started in 1814 (212 years ago) and commemorating the defeat of Napoleon and the surrender of Paris. It was completed in 1815, after the Battle of Waterloo (Napoleonic Wars), but collapsed in 1854 after an earlier lightning strike, and decades of weathering. Its replacement was therefore built slightly further from the edge of the hill. During repair work in 1889 a lightning conductor was added, and although the tower has since been struck by lightning on numerous occasions, no notable structural damage is evident. There is evidence to suggest that some sort of structure existed on the site even before the earlier structure was built. The monument is approximately 2 miles (3.2 km) south west of Hebden Bridge and approximately 2.5 miles (4 km) east of Todmorden town centre. The monument was Grade II listed in 1984.

The inscription above the entrance is worn and covered with lichen but it is legible and reads:

STOODLEY PIKE
A PEACE MONUMENT
ERECTED BY PUBLIC SUBSCRIPTION
COMMENCED IN 1814 TO COMMEMORATE
THE SURRENDER OF PARIS TO THE ALLIES
AND FINISHED AFTER THE BATTLE OF
WATERLOO WHEN PEACE WAS ESTABLIS-
HED IN 1815. BY A STRANGE COINCIDENCE
THE PIKE FELL ON THE DAY THE RUSSIAN
AMBASSADOR LEFT LONDON BEFORE THE
DECLARATION OF WAR WITH RUSSIA IN 1854
WAS REBUILT WHEN PEACE WAS RESTORED IN
1856
REPAIRED AND LIGHTNING CONDUCTOR FIXED
1889

== Access ==
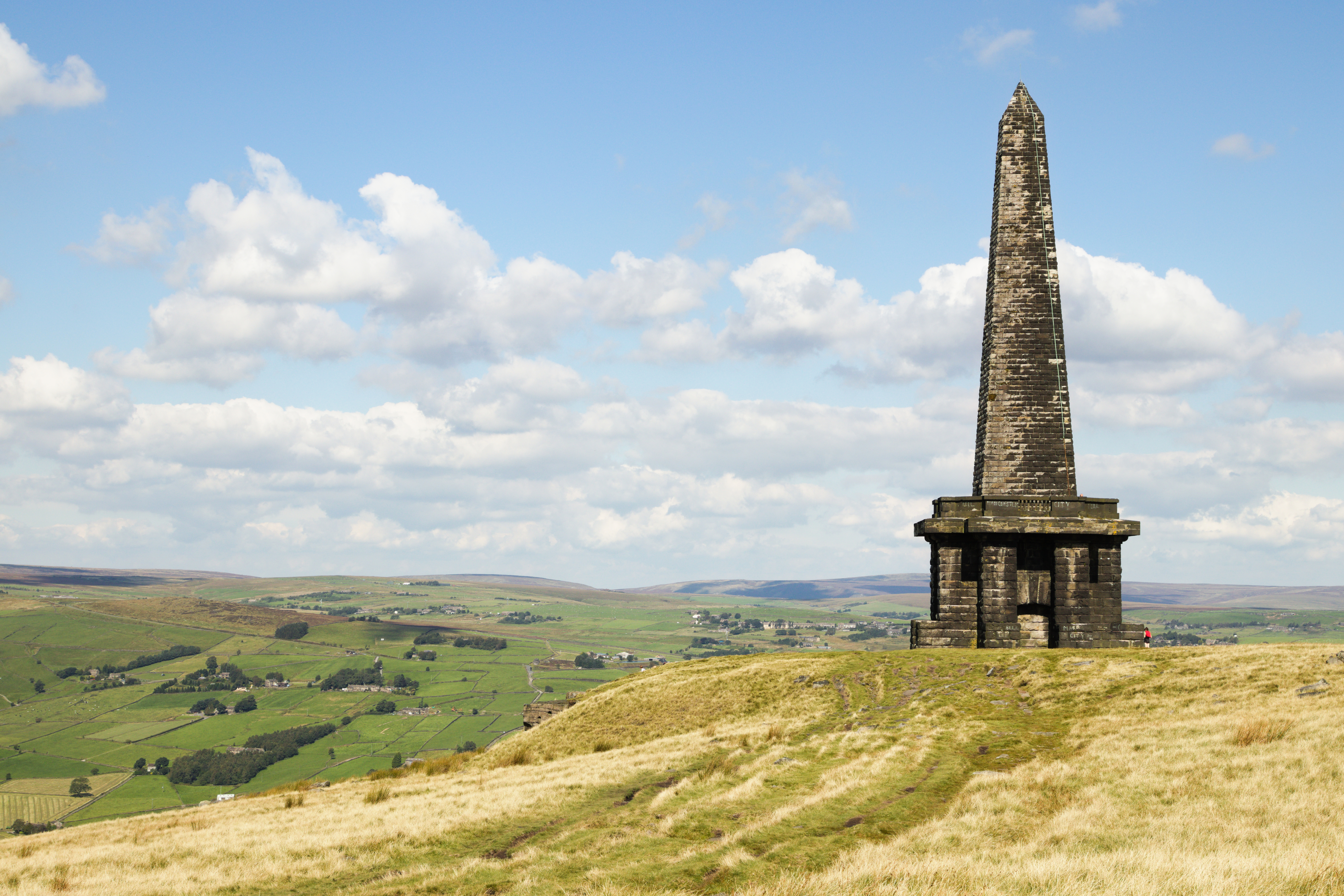
A closer view of the monument

The site is accessible by the Pennine Way and other well-defined public footpaths and the moor surrounding it is on access land. There is no vehicular or bicycle access to the monument, although it is reached by many mountain bikers who ride the technical trail following the Pennine Way. The Pike stands on Langfield Common, and is therefore the responsibility of Calderdale Council. Langfield Common is a SSSI.

Stoodley Pike Monument contains a spiral staircase of 39 steps, accessed from its north side. During repairs in 1889 a grille was added to the top step, allowing more light in, so that only 6 or 7 steps are in darkness. There are no windows. The entrance to the balcony, the highest point that can be reached, and some 40 feet above ground level, is on the west face.

Being accessible by right-of-way footpaths and Access Land restrictions, the site serves primarily as a destination for hikers and fell-runners. It is close to Mankinholes Youth Hostel, The Shepherd's Rest and the Top Brink pub. Just below it on the contour shelf at roughly 200 metres (660 ft) lies the Harvelin Park housing estate. From here walkers can enjoy an easy 30-minute walk to the Pike.

Many fell races visit the Pike, primarily those organised by Todmorden Harriers including the Noonstone, Hebden Bridge, Shepherd's Skyline and the Stoodley Pike Fell race.

Stoodley Pike Monument can be easily seen on the horizon from many miles away, such as standing in front of Beacon Hill, in Halifax, West Yorkshire or from Roper Lane in Queensbury, Bradford.

In recent years the entrance to the tower has been re-paved and a seat has been provided to the southwest of the monument.
