= South Pennine Moors =

Moorlands in the South Pennines, England

The South Pennine Moors are areas of moorland in the South Pennines in northern England. The designation is applied to two different but overlapping areas, a Site of Special Scientific Interest (SSSI) covering a number of areas in West Yorkshire, North Yorkshire, Lancashire and Greater Manchester, and a much larger Special Area of Conservation (SAC) covering parts of Derbyshire, South Yorkshire and West Yorkshire, and small areas of Cheshire, Staffordshire, Greater Manchester, Lancashire and North Yorkshire.

== SSSI ==
The SSSI consists of three separate areas; Ilkley Moor, between Ilkley and Keighley, West Yorkshire; a large area north of the Calder Valley and east of Burnley, straddling the borders of West Yorkshire, North Yorkshire and Lancashire; an area south of the Calder Valley, between Rochdale and Huddersfield, straddling the border of West Yorkshire and Greater Manchester.

The SSSI has a total area of 20,938 hectares (81 sq mi) and is the largest area of unenclosed moorland in West Yorkshire. There are extensive areas of blanket bog, interspersed by species-rich flushes and mires. Other habitats include wet and dry heaths and acid grasslands. The blanket bogs are dominated by cotton-grass and heather, with varying amounts of crowberry and bilberry. Areas of wet heath have cross-leaved heath and cranberry. The acid grasslands are dominated by mat-grass and wavy hair-grass with purple moor grass dominating on the wet slopes, along with the heath rush in the wettest places. Chickweed wintergreen and bog pondweed occur here, plants rare in the region. The most species-rich and biodiverse communities are found at wet flushes.

The South Pennine Moors also provides habitat for red grouse, curlew, skylark, meadow pipit, dunlin, golden plover, merlin and twite. There are also lapwing, snipe and redshank, northern wheatear, whinchat, ring ouzel and in some years stonechat, as well as peregrine falcons and buzzards.

== SAC ==
About two-thirds of the South Pennine Moors SAC is in the Peak District National Park, which is mainly in the Dark Peak SSSI and not in the South Pennine Moors SSSI.

The SAC has a total area of 64,983 hectares (251 sq mi).
