= Brushes Clough Reservoir =

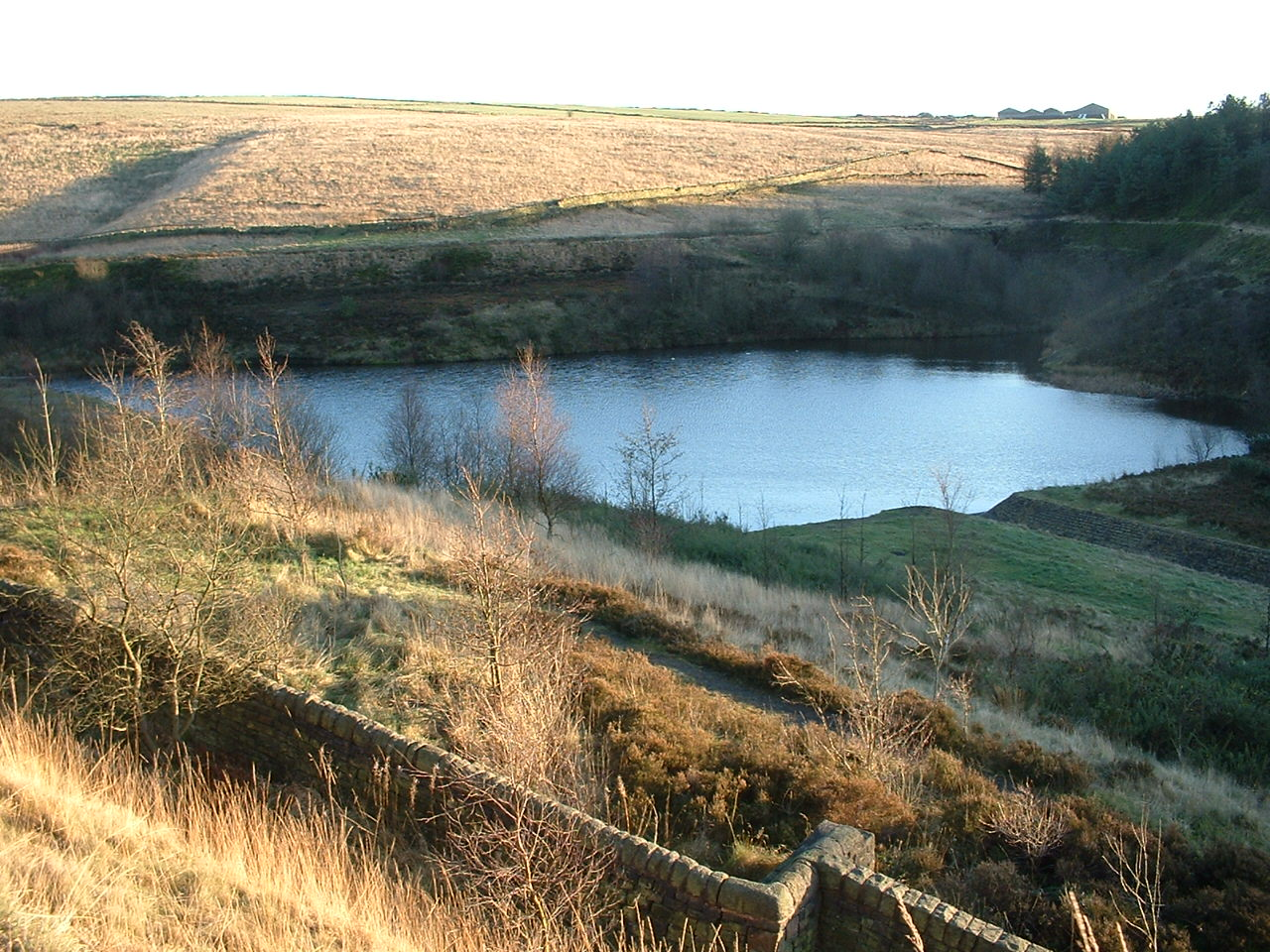

- Location within Greater Manchester
- Location: Greater Manchester
- Coordinates: 53°35′6″N 2°4′6″W
- Type: reservoir
- Primary inflows: Brushes/Leornardin Brook
- Primary outflows: Brushes/Leornardin Brook
- Basin countries: England
- Settlements: Oldham

Brushes Clough Reservoir is on Crompton Moor in Shaw and Crompton, Greater Manchester, England. It was created in the 19th century by the damming of Leornardin Brook. The outlet of the reservoir flows through Brushes Clough to merge with Old Brook, a tributary of the River Beal.
