= Crompton Moor =

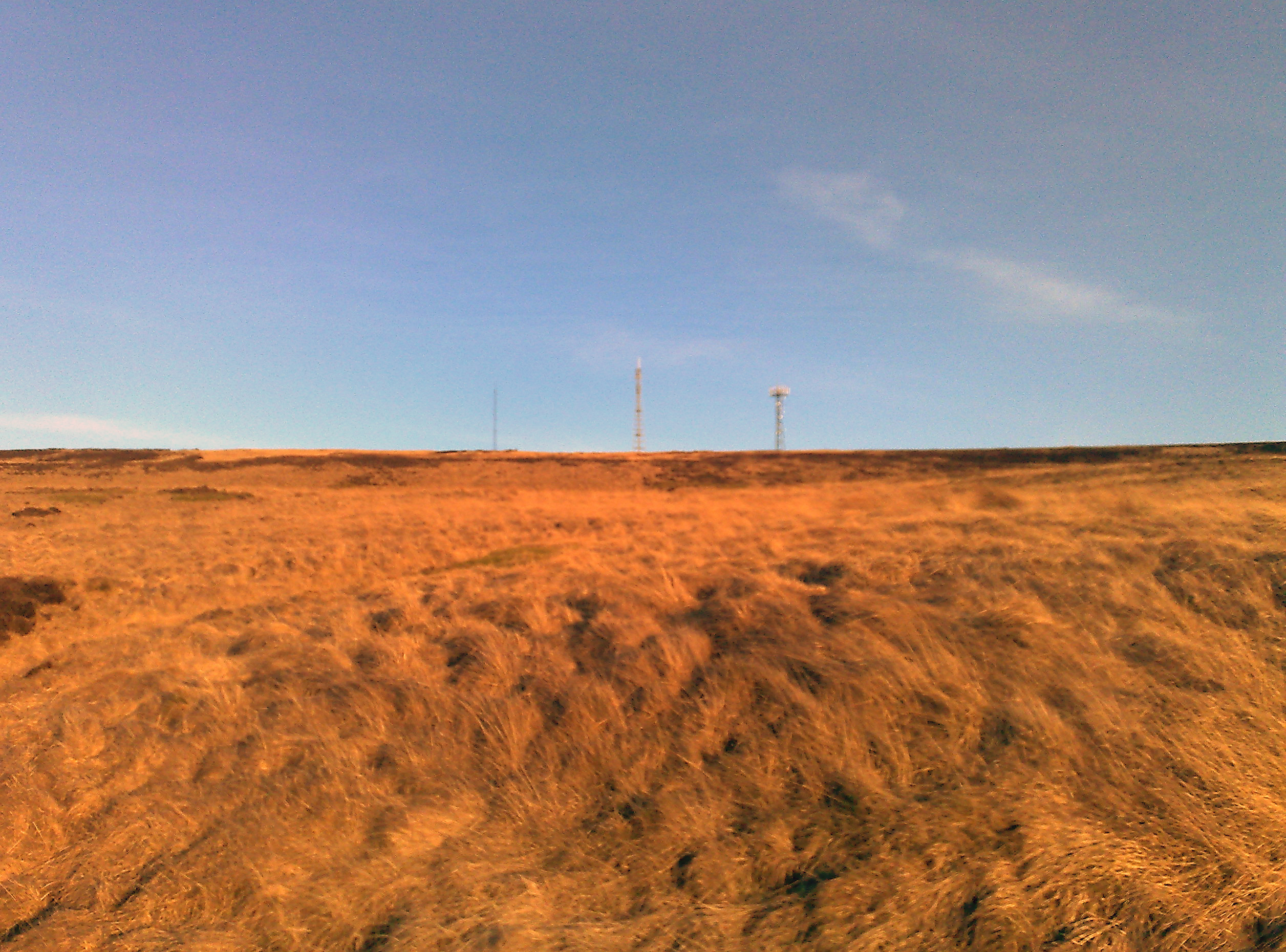
- Crompton Moor towards its summit at Crow Knowl

Highest point
- Elevation: 391 m (1,283 ft)
- Coordinates: 53°35′27.82″N 2°03′42.84″W

Geography
- Location within Greater Manchester
- Location: Shaw and Crompton, Greater Manchester, England
- Parent range: South Pennines
- OS grid: SD960105

Geology
- Mountain type(s): Commons, Site of Biological Interest

Climbing
- Easiest route: Crompton Way

Crompton Moor (archaically known as High Moor) is an area of moorland in the South Pennines, in North West England. It lies along the northeastern outskirts of Shaw and Crompton, in the Metropolitan Borough of Oldham, Greater Manchester.

Spanning approximately 160 acres (65 ha), and reaching an elevation of 1,282 feet (391 m) at Crow Knowl, Crompton Moor is one of the largest open spaces run by Oldham Countryside Service. It is a registered common of Greater Manchester, and a Site of Biological Importance since 2003.

The Friends of Crompton Moor are an active conservation group, who work in partnership with Oldham Countryside Service to maintain and protect this locally unique environment.

Most of Crompton Moor is covered in purple moor grass and heather, but there is also a significant amount of pine forest. Wildlife on the moors includes red grouse, golden plover, and the meadow pipit.

An early type of axe known as a palstave has been discovered on Crompton Moor, providing evidence of Bronze Age human activity. During the 18th century Crompton Moor had several farms; dry stone walls still exist from these times as evidence of field division for pasture.

Crow Knowl, at the summit of Crompton Moor, features a transmitter station, Crow Knowl Telecommunications mast, and an Ordnance Survey triangulation station (at grid reference SD960105). Crow Knowl overlooks Rochdale to the northwest, Manchester to the southwest and Denshaw to the east, amongst other parts of Greater Manchester.

Crompton Moor has been the site of several wildfires. A significant fire occurred in 1995, raging for over two weeks and burning a large proportion of the surface vegetation as well as the subsurface peat. Another took place in March 2007.

Brushes Clough and Pingot are former coal and sandstone quarries on Crompton Moor. During the 1970s, quarrying was halted, the land was reclaimed, and thousands of pine trees were planted. The area has since been used for recreation, including hiking, orienteering, cycling and horse riding. Brushes Clough Reservoir was constructed in the 19th century by the Oldham County Borough Council, using stone quarried from this site. After being managed by United Utilities for a number of years, the reservoir and some of the surrounding land is now privately owned.

An unnamed waterfall (provisionally called Crompton Waterfall) cascades off Crompton Moor into the now unused Pingot Quarry forming the Old Brook, a tributary of the River Beal.

== Gallery ==
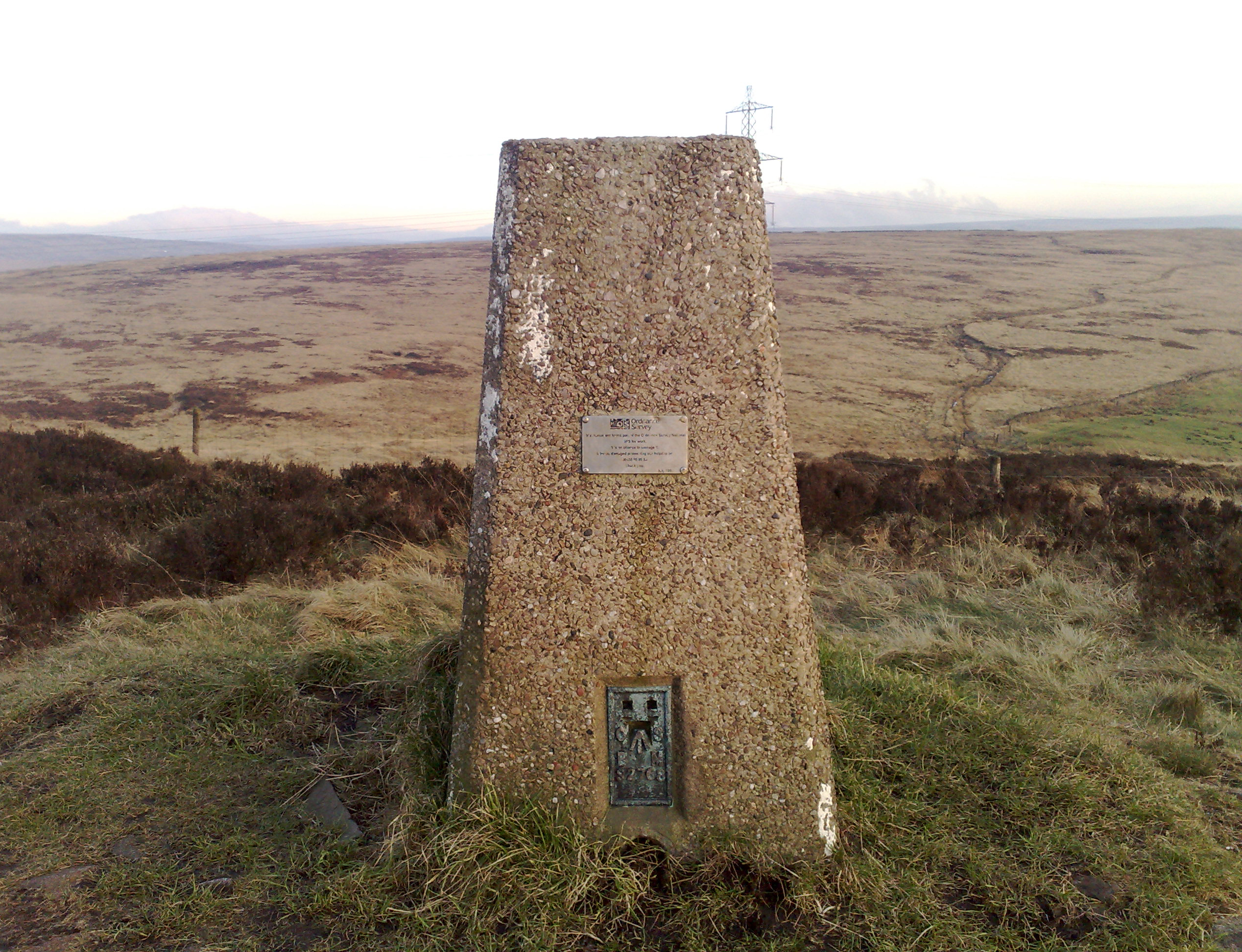
The Ordnance Survey triangulation station at Crow Knowl

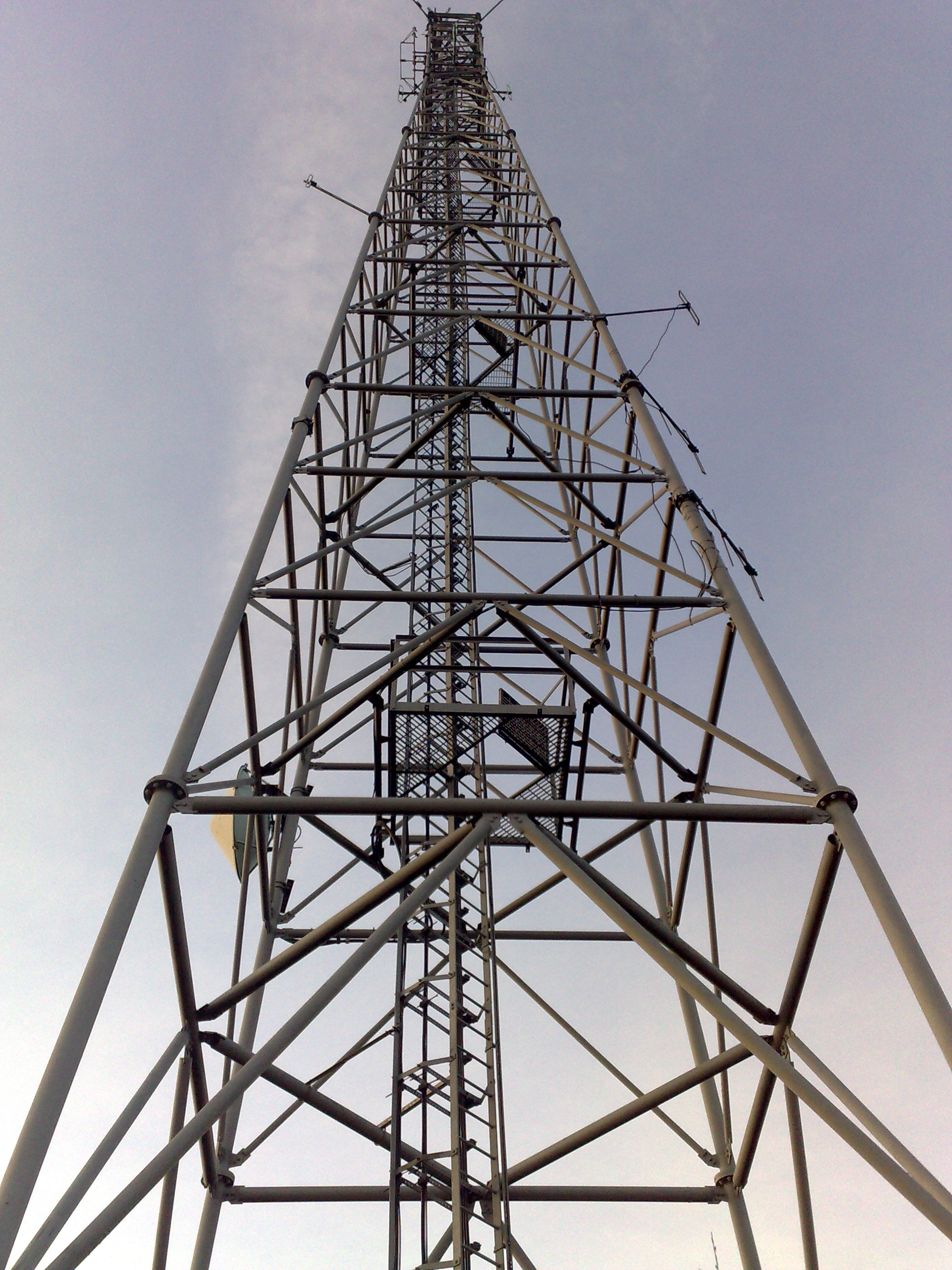
Crow Knowl Telecommunications Mast

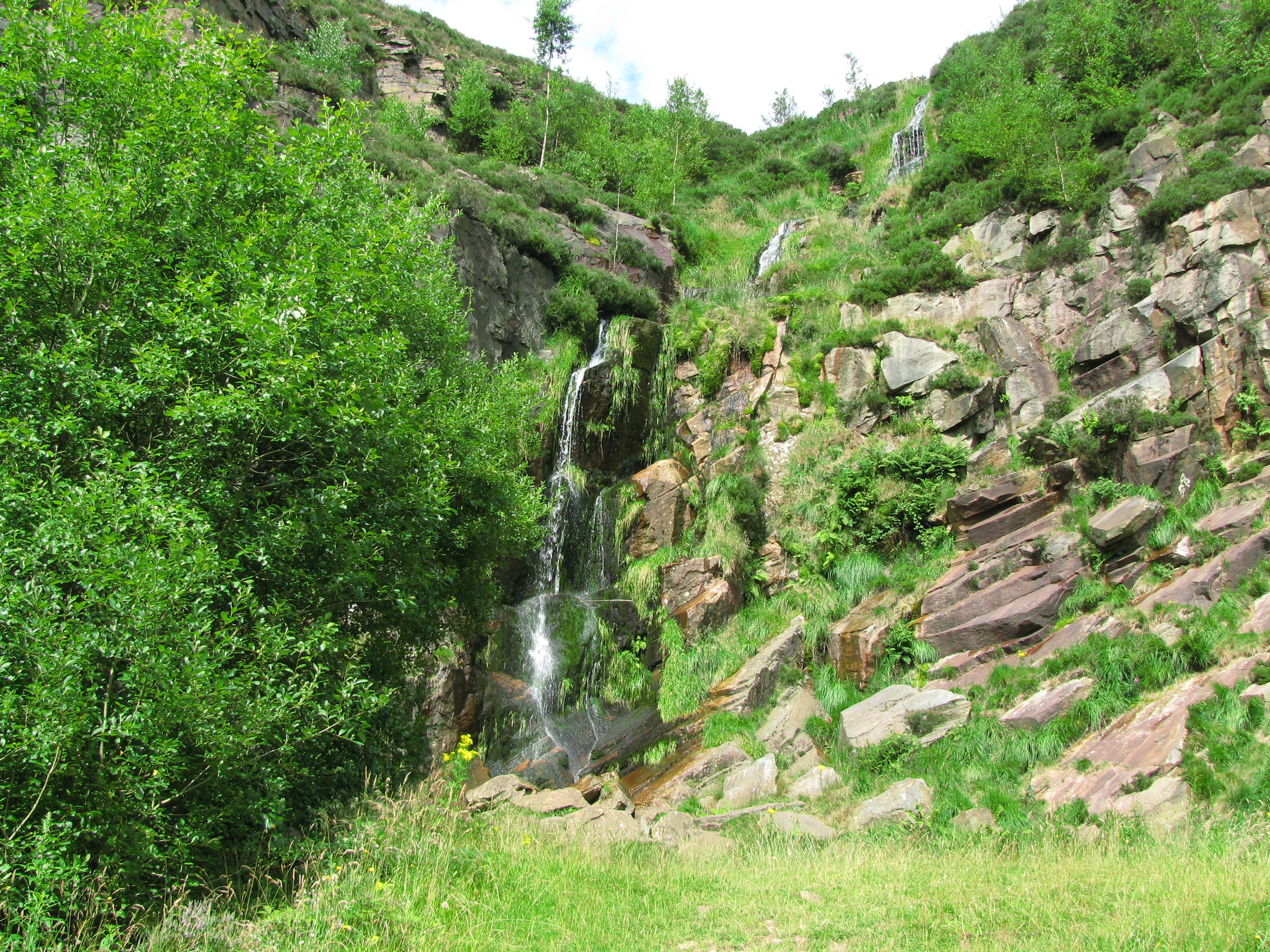
The waterfall at Pingot Quarry

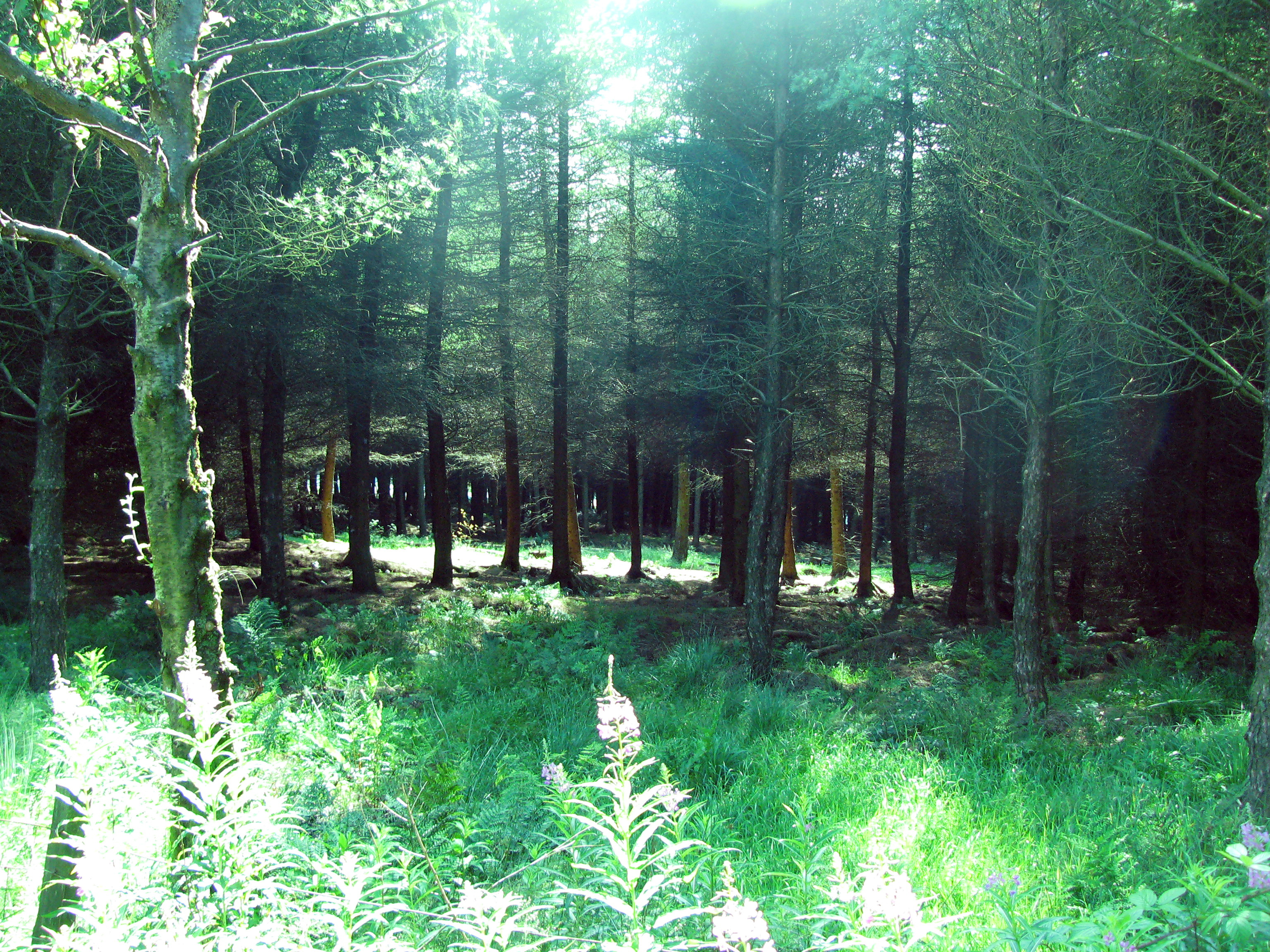
Trees in the dense forest in Crompton Moor
