= Moorside, Greater Manchester =

Coordinates: 53.5605°N 2.0757°W

Moorside
- Location within Greater Manchester
- Metropolitan borough: Oldham
- Metropolitan county: Greater Manchester
- Region: North West
- Country: England
- Sovereign state: United Kingdom
- Post town: OLDHAM
- Postcode district: OL1
- Dialling code: 0161
- Police: Greater Manchester
- Fire: Greater Manchester
- Ambulance: North West
- UK Parliament: Oldham East and Saddleworth

Moorside is a suburb of Oldham in Greater Manchester, England.

It is located in the north east of the township in a semi-rural locality bordering Saddleworth, contiguous with Sholver which lies to the west.

The area has many suburban houses and a few council houses. The centre of Moorside is at Ripponden Road where the Co-op and local businesses are. The churches in Moorside are Saint Thomas' CofE and Our Lady's R.C Church .

== History ==
In common with many other districts of Oldham, Moorside saw considerable expansion in the mid-19th century. This was in the main due to the efforts of industrialist Thomas Mellodew & Sons. The Mellodews of Moorside were textile manufacturers (velvet) and had a number of mills in the Moorside area.

Success attended the efforts of Thomas Mellodew and his business soon expanded. He began to purchase property and to erect dwellings until the whole of Moorside village, with the exception of a few houses, became his; the number of houses in his possession varying in estimate between 200 and 300. His interest in industry extended to the quarry at the foot of Besom Hill with its brickworks, which he ran in a partnership with John Clegg and which lasted until 1882.

In the mid-1960s a number of private builders' estates began to appear on Haven Lane, Counthill, Parkfield and Turf Pit Lane. This tremendous increase in population has changed Moorside in its character from a cluster of houses sheltering under the brow of a hill to a large piece of suburbia; the former hill dwellers have given place to a developing suburban community.

== Notable residents ==
- Cora Kirk, actress
