= Pencil Brook =

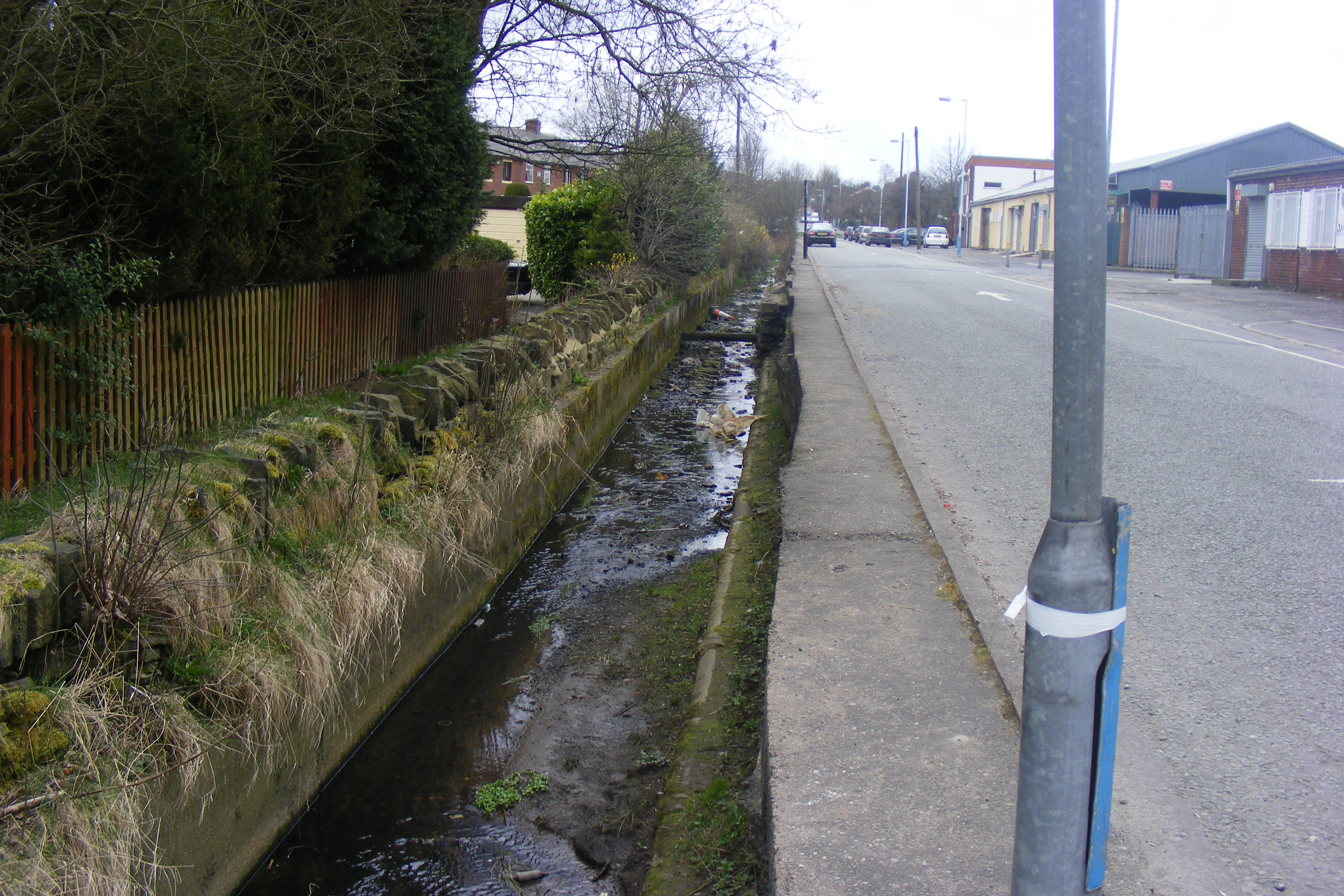

Location
- Country: England

Physical characteristics
- Source
  - location: High Crompton
- Mouth
  - location: River Beal, Goats
  - coordinates: 53°35′11.15″N 2°05′20.88″W

Pencil Brook is a small watercourse in High Crompton in the Metropolitan Borough of Oldham, Greater Manchester, England. It is a tributary of the River Beal.

== Gallery ==
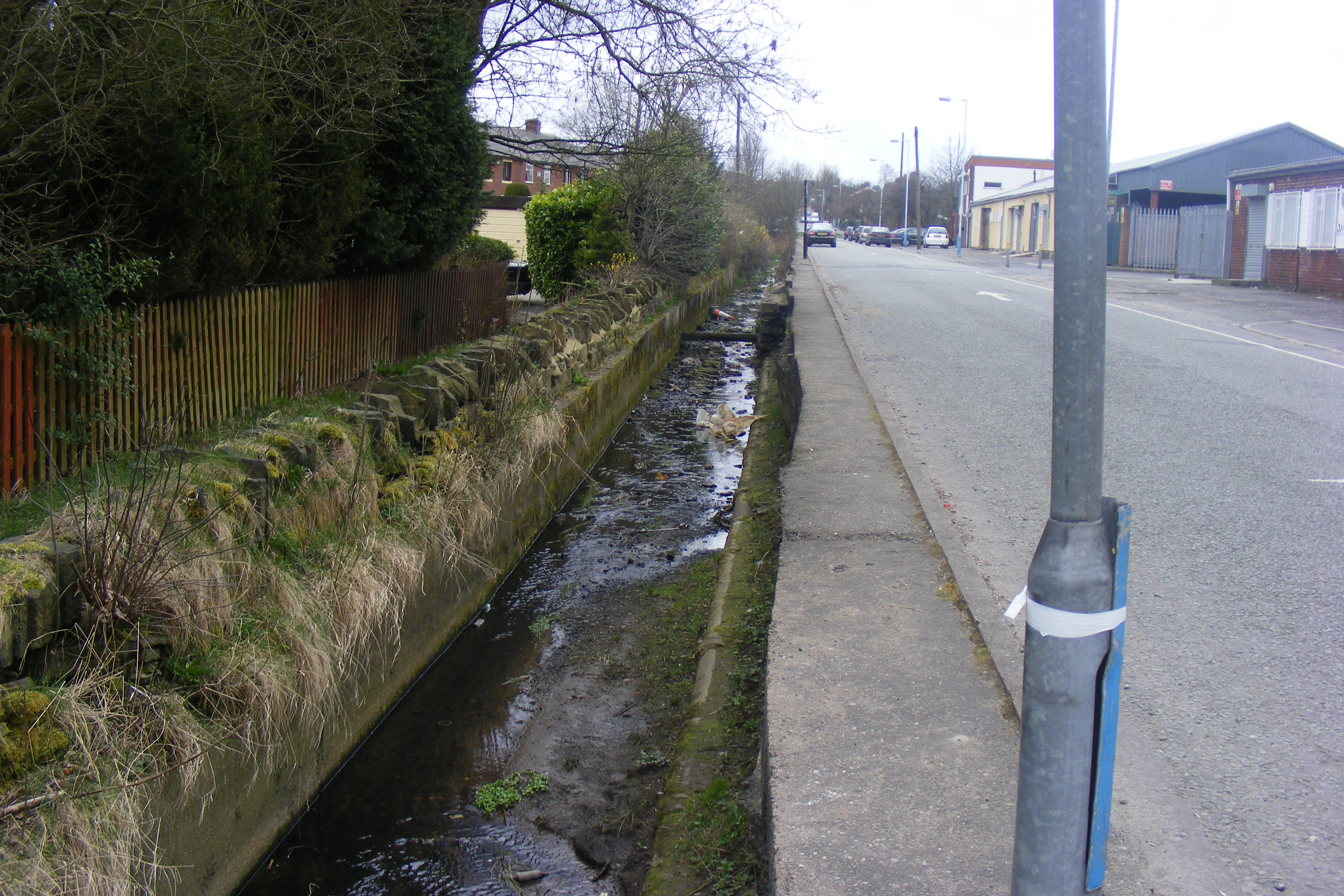
Upstream by Duchess Street

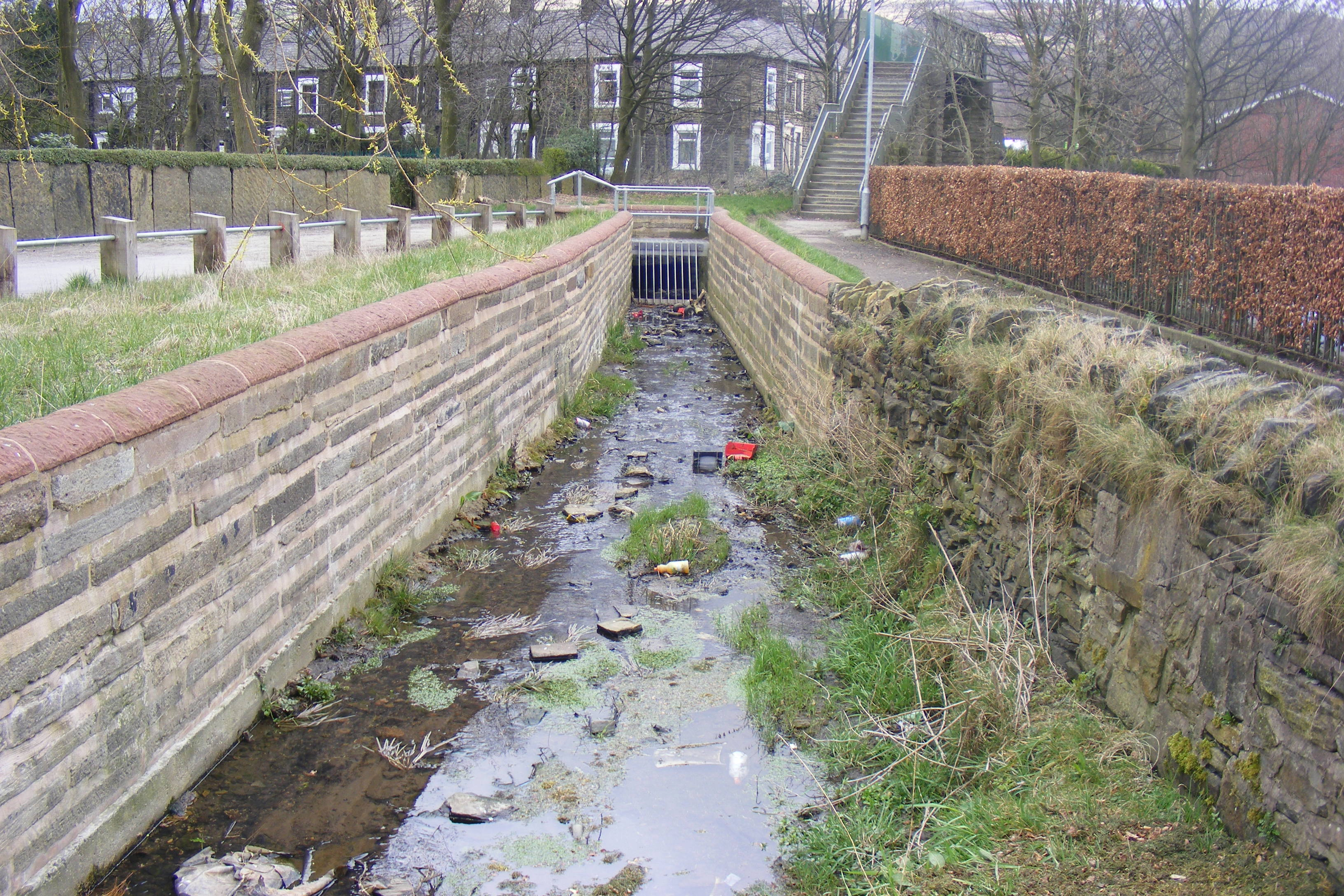
Downstream to the railway line

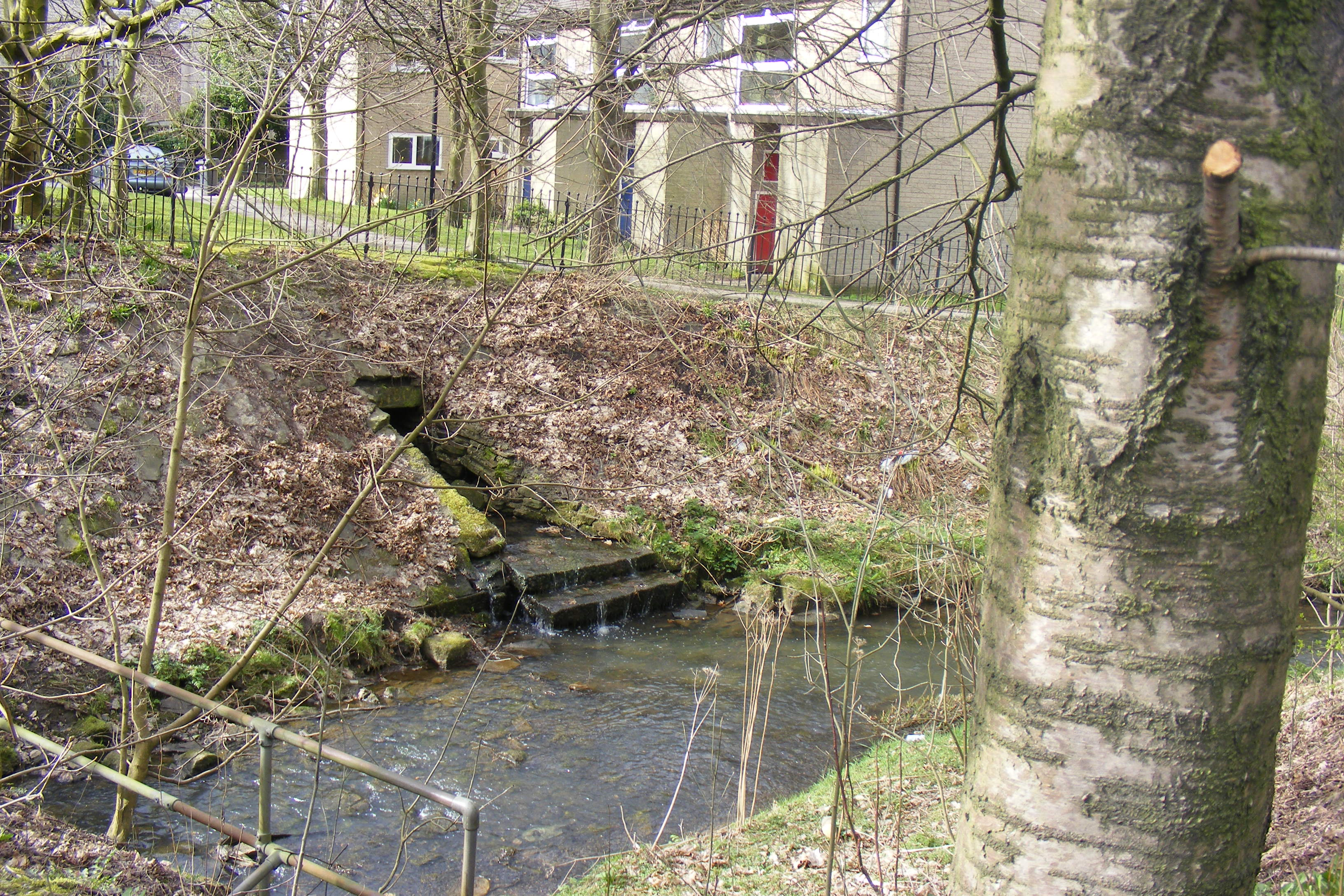
Confluence with River Beal
