= Butterworth Hall Brook =

Stream in Greater Manchester, England

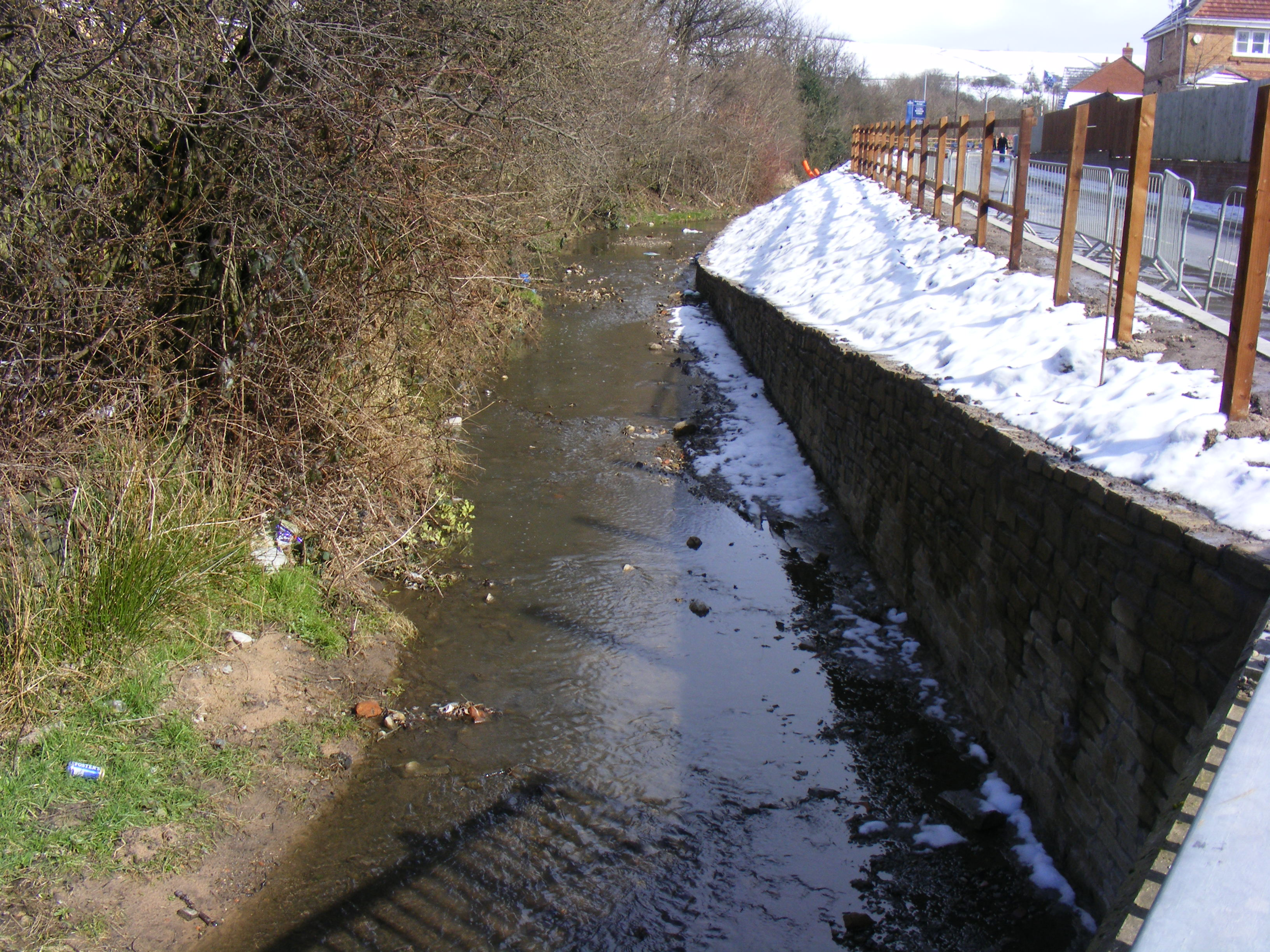
- Water Lane in 2008

Location
- Country: England

Physical characteristics
- Source
  - location: Tunshill
- Mouth
  - location: River Beal, Milnrow Precinct
  - coordinates: 53°36′26.21″N 2°06′29.19″W

Butterworth Hall Brook is a water course in Greater Manchester, North-West England, which flows through the village of Milnrow and is a tributary of the River Beal.

== Course ==
Rising at Tunshill, just south of Tunshill Farm, where it is almost immediately fed by a small streamlet, the brook flows in a south-westerly direction towards Milnrow, is culverted under the M62 Motorway, then runs along the eastern boundary of Tunshill Golf Course, then down a clough through Claylands Head, to the hamlet of Butterworth Hall. Flowing past Good Intent, it is again culverted beneath Church Terrace before passing under Bilson Bridge on Newhey Road, joining the River Beal, behind Milnrow Precinct. The brook falls 55m.(180 ft.) and barely exceeds 2 km.(1 1/4m.) in length.

== History ==
Butterworth Hall Brook is named after the hamlet of Butterworth Hall, which surrounded the original manorial hall of the ancient township of Butterworth. In 1867 three men were drowned in Tunshill Colliery, close to the source of the brook, when underground waters feeding the brook broke through old mine workings. Part of the stream bed below Claylands Head, paved with setts, once formed a bridleway called Water Lane. This was the start of two packhorse routes over the Pennines via Tunshill - the Rapes Highway and the Readycon Gap route over Bleakedgate Moor. After serious flooding, the brook was channeled alongside the road, which retains the name of Water Lane.

== Gallery ==
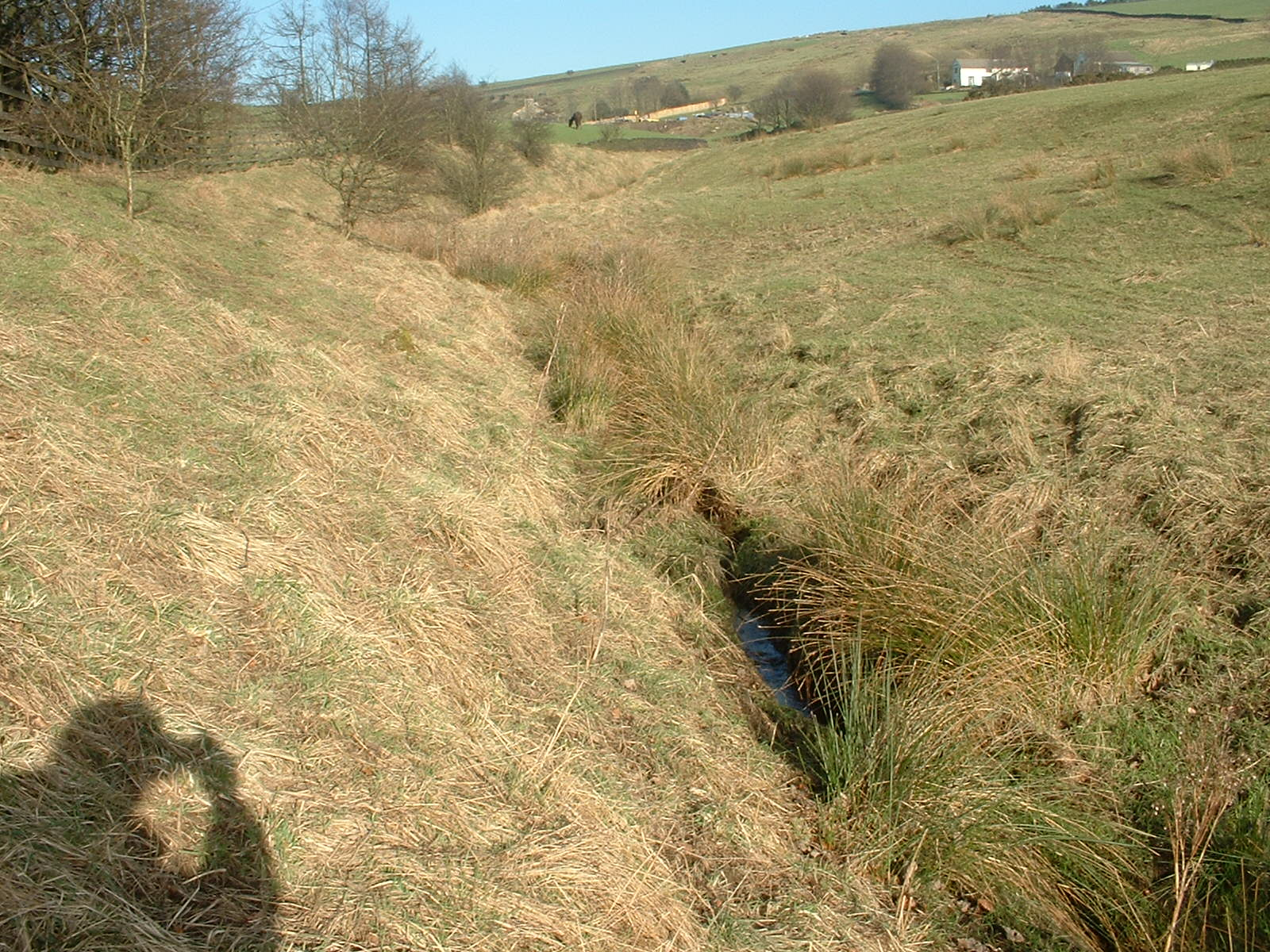
Upstream from the M62

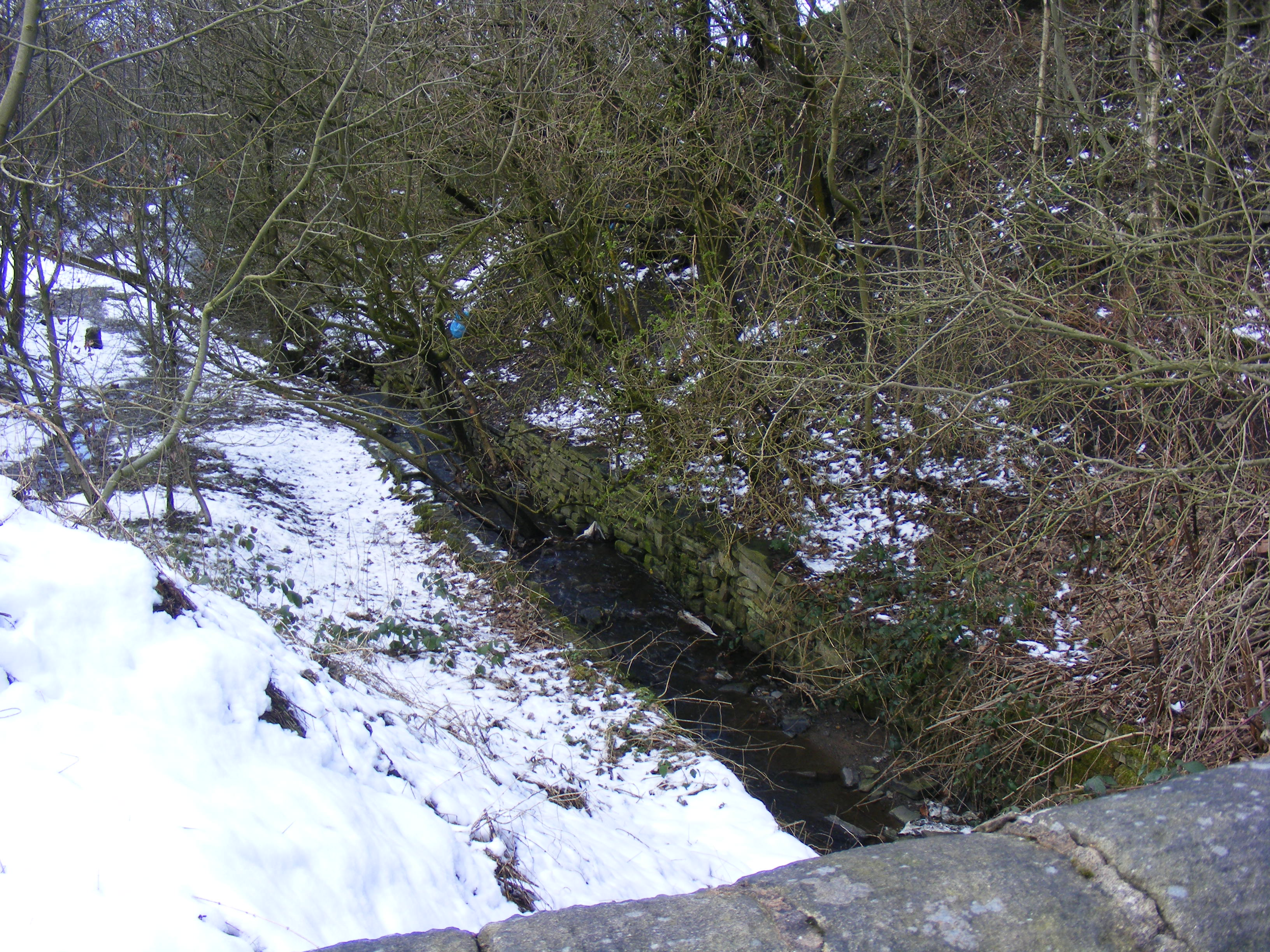
Downstream from Claylands Head

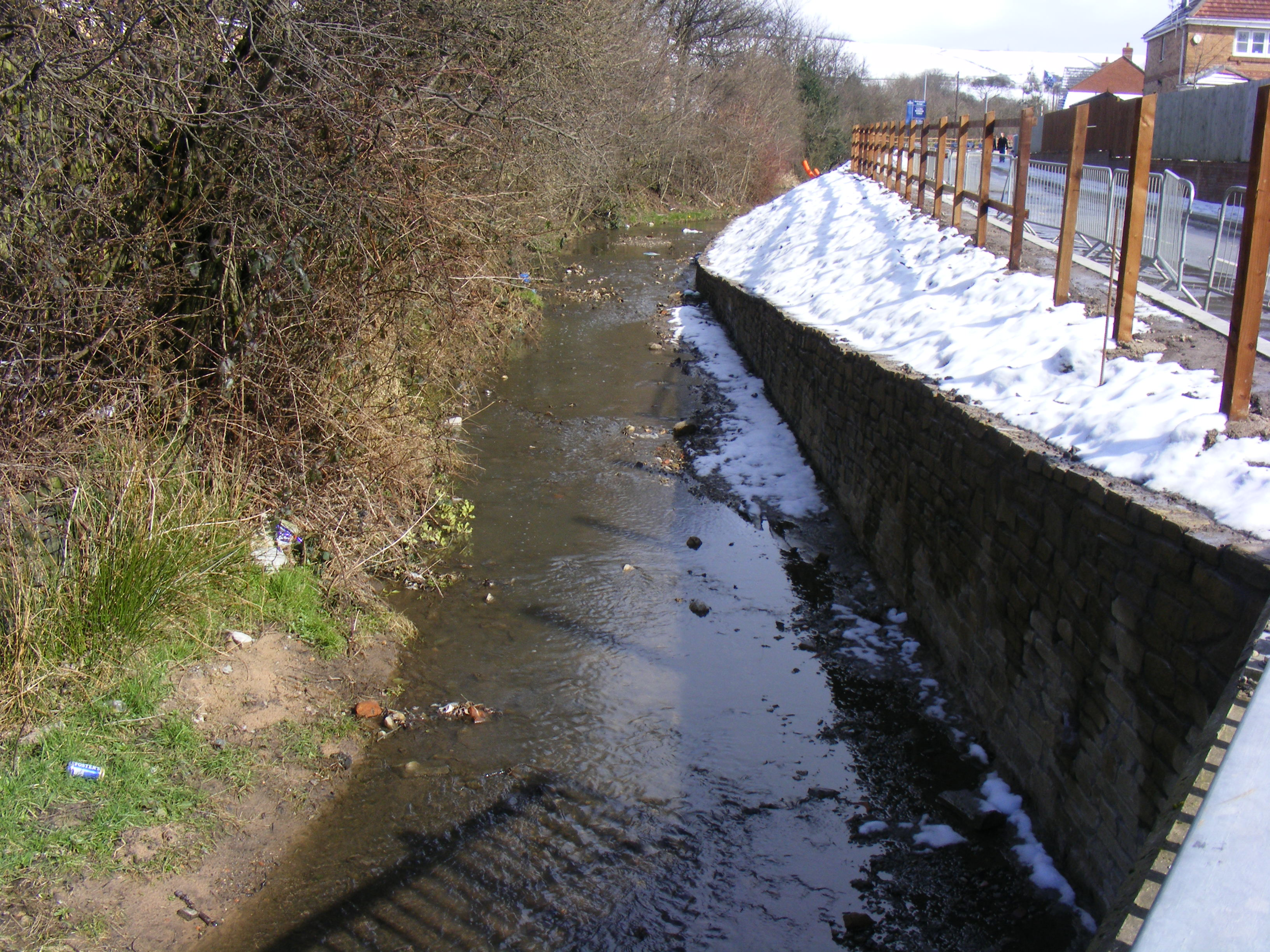
Water Lane upstream

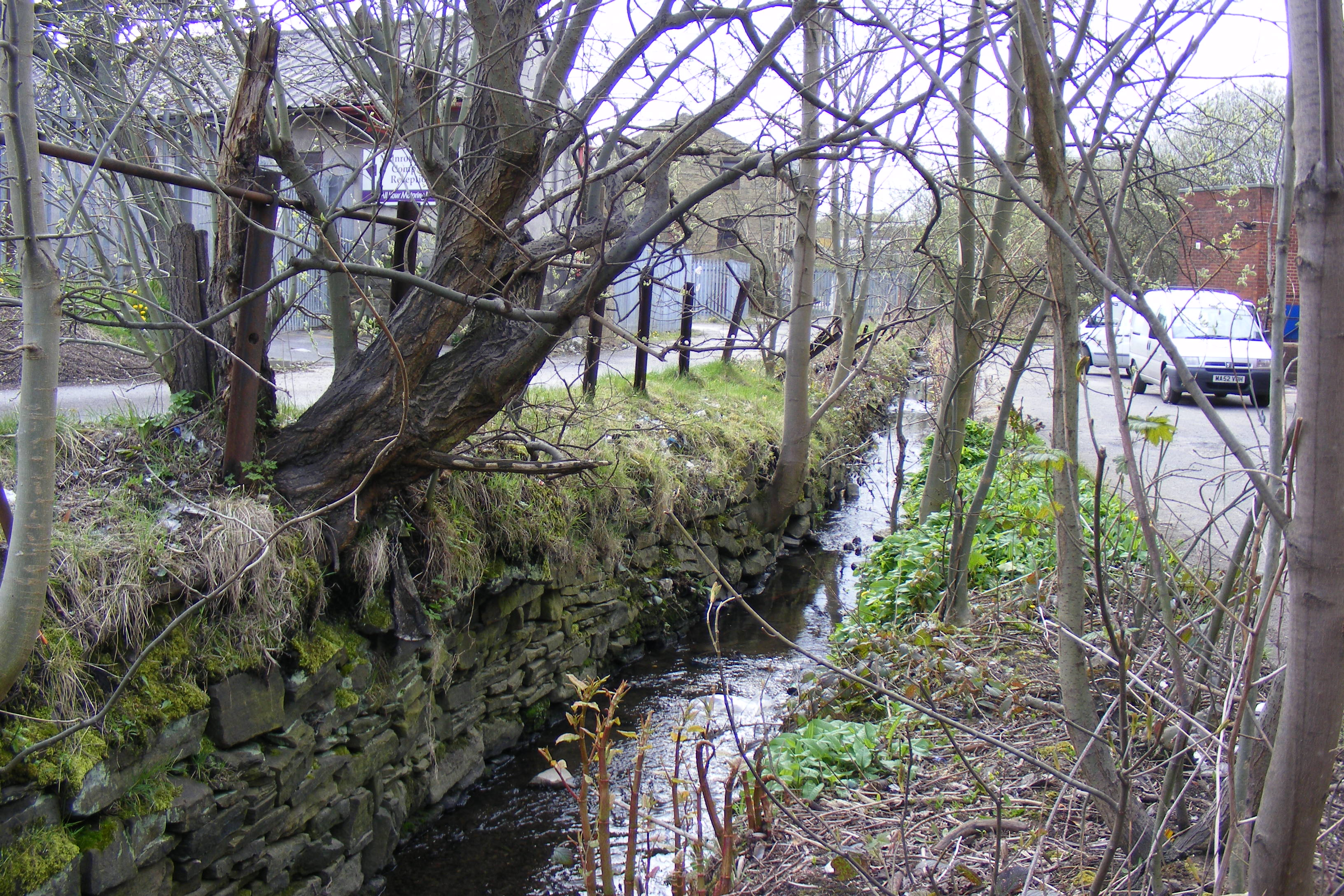
Milnrow Precinct

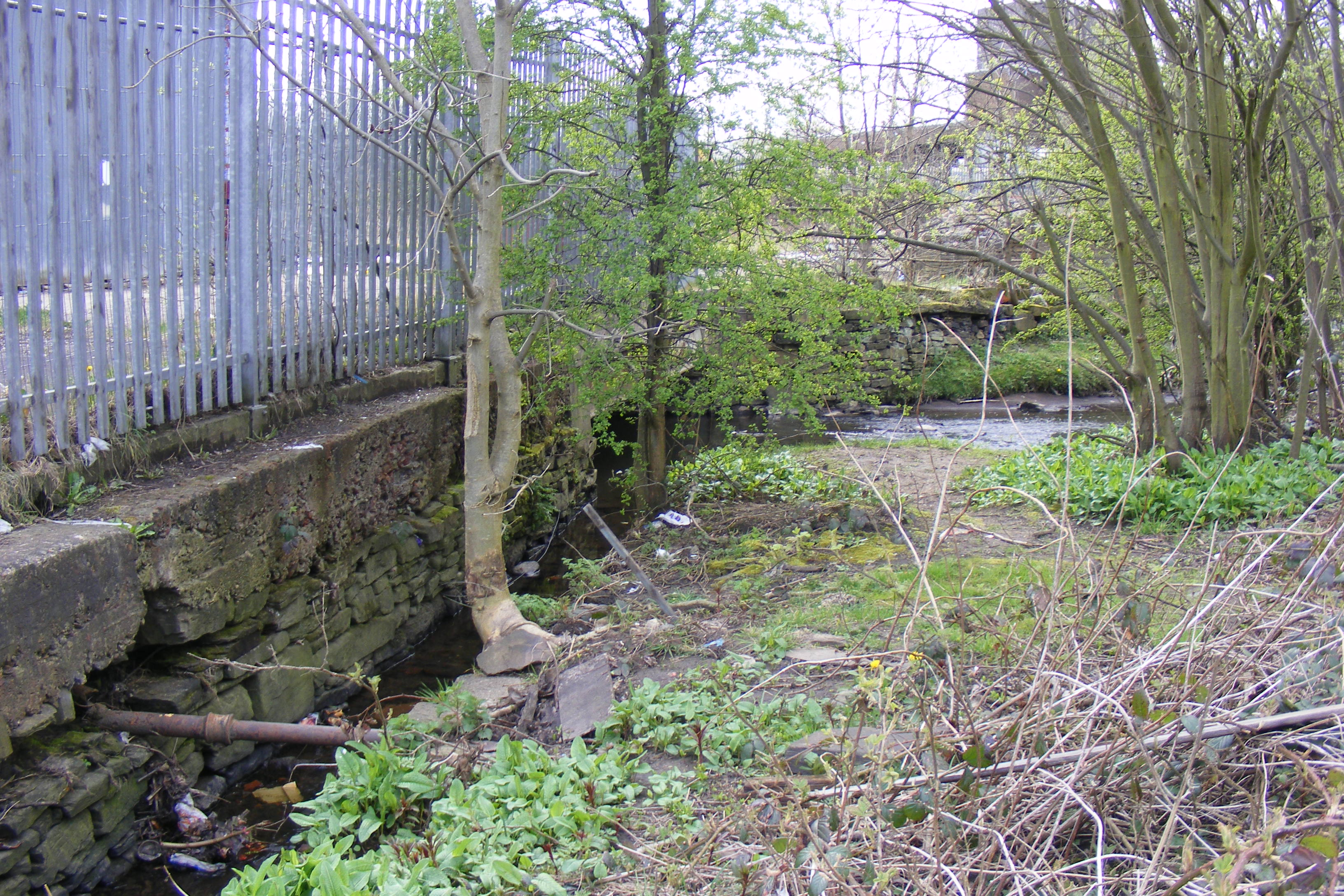
Confluence with River Beal
