= Sholver =

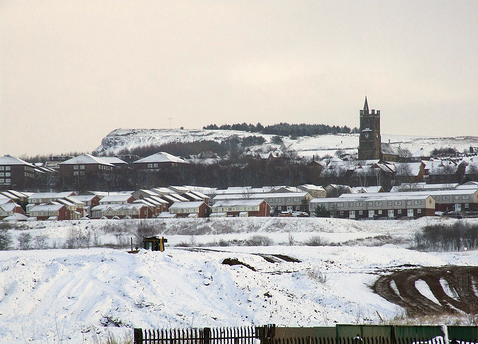
- Sholver and Moorside above the Beal Valley

- Location within Greater Manchester
- OS grid reference: SD950077
- Metropolitan borough: Oldham
- Metropolitan county: Greater Manchester
- Region: North West
- Country: England
- Sovereign state: United Kingdom
- Post town: OLDHAM
- Postcode district: OL1
- Dialling code: 0161
- Police: Greater Manchester
- Fire: Greater Manchester
- Ambulance: North West
- UK Parliament: Oldham East and Saddleworth

Sholver is an area of Oldham, in Greater Manchester, England. An elevated, residential area, it lies near the middle of the Oldham part of the valley of the River Beal, two miles (three kilometres) northeast of Oldham's commercial centre, nearly at the northeasternmost extremity of the town, by open countryside close to the source of the River Medlock and by the border with Saddleworth.

Historically a part of Lancashire, Sholver and its surroundings have provided archaeological evidence of Neolithic activity in the area. The name Sholver is of Old Norse derivation, and the locality, anciently, was a hamlet, independent of Oldham. Top Sholver is the site of a large council estate built in the 1960s. Bottom Sholver consists of higher-value suburban semi-detached housing, built in the 1990s, although it still contains a very small number of council houses.

Locations within the area like Sholver Millennium Green Besom Hill Country Park Strinesdale, Fullwood Nature Reserve and Community Garden are all particularly nice areas to visit.

== History ==
The earliest known evidence of a human presence in what is now Sholver and adjacent Moorside is attested by the discovery of Neolithic flint arrow-heads and workings found at Besom Hill, implying habitation 7–10,000 years ago.

Like Oldham, the name Sholver is thought to be of Old Norse origin; a derivative of "erg (a Norse word for hill-pasture) of a farmer called Skjolgr (a Norse forename)". Indeed, Norsemen occupied Sholver in the 10th century, where they erected shielings - temporary huts in a remote pasture akin to the style of living done in their native Scandinavia. It is recorded as Sholgher in 1291, Choller in 1311.

For centuries, in keeping with the known history of Oldham, Sholver was a remote and obscure hamlet set amongst the Pennines. The plan of the hamlet of Sholver changed little since the Early Middle Ages. At the end of the 17th century the medieval timber and plaster dwellings were replaced by solid farms in the local grey sandstone, without substantial changes in the sites of the buildings. The cottages and farms were still grouped around a wide central oval green. The freehold of Sholver's farms had been bought from the Prestwich family in the 17th century at the time when the residencies were largely rebuilt in stone.

James Butterworth, a poet and local historian, described Sholver as "a small village of great antiquity where the houses are chiefly built of stone, and have a rustic appearance," and describes a very pleasant retreat "in the neighbourhood of the cottages called the Dingle". Among early historical references to this area we find, in 1212, Ralph Tagun held Sholver as 4 oxgangs of land; it was part of the Nevill estate then in hand of King John. In 1346 it was held in moieties by Richard de Pilkington and Cecily de Hulme. From the Hulmes it descended to the Prestwich family, who held it till the middle of the 17th century. It was sold to various persons about 1657. In April 1540, during the reign of Charles I of England, Robert Lytham carried out some measuring of Sholver moor.

As cotton milling was introduced in the 18th century, the cottage industry of Sholver declined, and instead became an important source of coal which was growing in demand. James Butterworth claimed that "the Manchester market seems to prefer the coal dug in this parish before that of any other." As early as 1791 Edmund Kershaw of Sholver was a known collier, though some of the early coal mines in the area-bell or beehive pits-date back as early as 1542.

During the 1920s, while the area was still underdeveloped, rumors spread of a man who resided in the woodland surrounding what is now Besom Hill Country Park. In 1923, a search occurred and a mob destroyed much of the woodland in an attempt to find this man. Concrete proof of his existence has never been confirmed.

The most profound development of modern Sholver began in May 1966. The Oldham County Borough Council began construction on its huge Sholver housing estates on what had been farm pastureland. On elevated land, some 1,000 feet (300 metres) above sea level, the council aimed to provide nearly 1,700 dwellings. This increase in population has changed Sholver in its character from a cluster of houses sheltering under the brow of a hill to a large council estate. Sholver continues to have high numbers of social rented properties.

In 1998 plans to create, Sholver Millennium Green started to take place. Designation was driven by community projects which had to satisfy a number of objectives, one of which was the inclusion of significant ‘natural’ areas where people can enjoy nature and wildlife at first hand. Like all past national commemorative programmes (e.g. the Waterloo Churches, and the planting of trees to celebrate the Jubilees of Queen Victoria), the Millennium Greens are about defining the present in order to create the heritage of the future. Sholver Millennium Green was created as part of a national programme of celebrations at the turn of the Millennium.

== Governance ==
Lying within the historic county boundaries of Lancashire since the early 12th century, Sholver was recorded in 1212 as being one of five parts of the thegnage estate of Kaskenmoor, which was held on behalf of King John by Roger de Montbegon and William de Nevill. The other parts of this estate were Crompton, Glodwick, Oldham, and Werneth. Sholver would later form part of the township of Oldham within the ancient ecclesiastical parish of Prestwich-cum-Oldham, in the hundred of Salford.

The Sholver estate archaically covered a wide area and included areas such as Watersheddings, Barrowshaw and Counthill lying south of the modern Sholver housing development.

== Sholver Millennium Green ==
Sholver Millennium Green is one of 245 Millennium Greens, around England created at the Turn of the Millennium- is owned and run by a local charity as a public greenspace. This is one of the largest Millennium Greens, at 25 acres and is an attractive countryside escape for the people of the nearby council estates etc.

== Geography ==
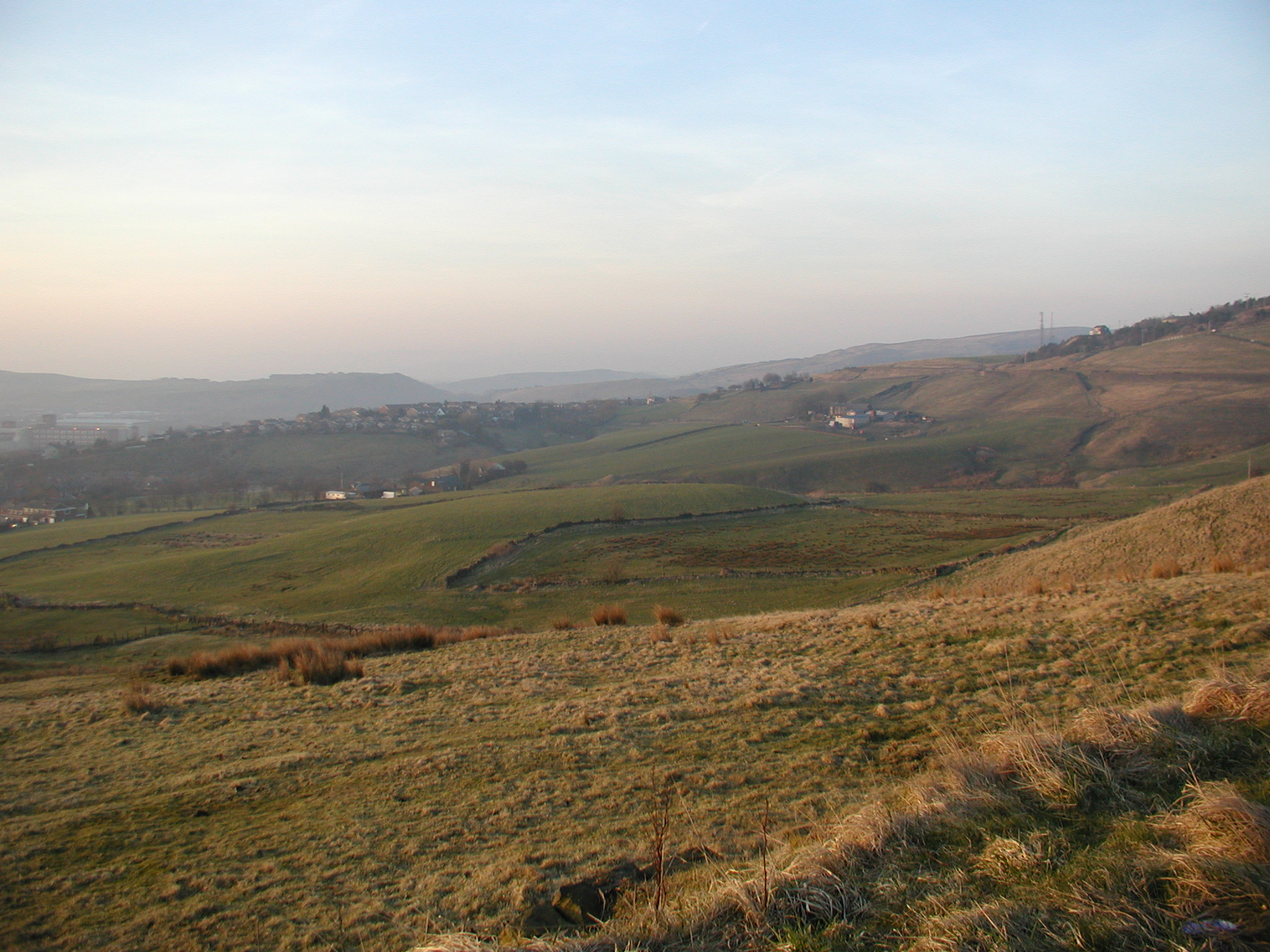
A view from Sholver down the Beal Valley, towards Shaw and Crompton.

At 53°33′57.9″N 2°4′29.1″W (53.566097, -2.074748), Sholver stands on a steep hillside, about 1,000 feet (300 m) above sea level, two miles (three kilometres) northeast of Oldham's commercial centre, nearly at the northeasternmost extremity of the town. Saddleworth and the South Pennines are close to the east. The River Beal lies in the valley below to the west, and beyond this, Royton and Shaw and Crompton. Moorside is a suburban area contiguous with Sholver's east. Sholver lies on the eastern edge of the Greater Manchester Urban Area.

Archaic localities in and around Sholver include Sholvermoor and Sholver Slack.
