= Old Brook (England) =

Watercourse in Greater Manchester

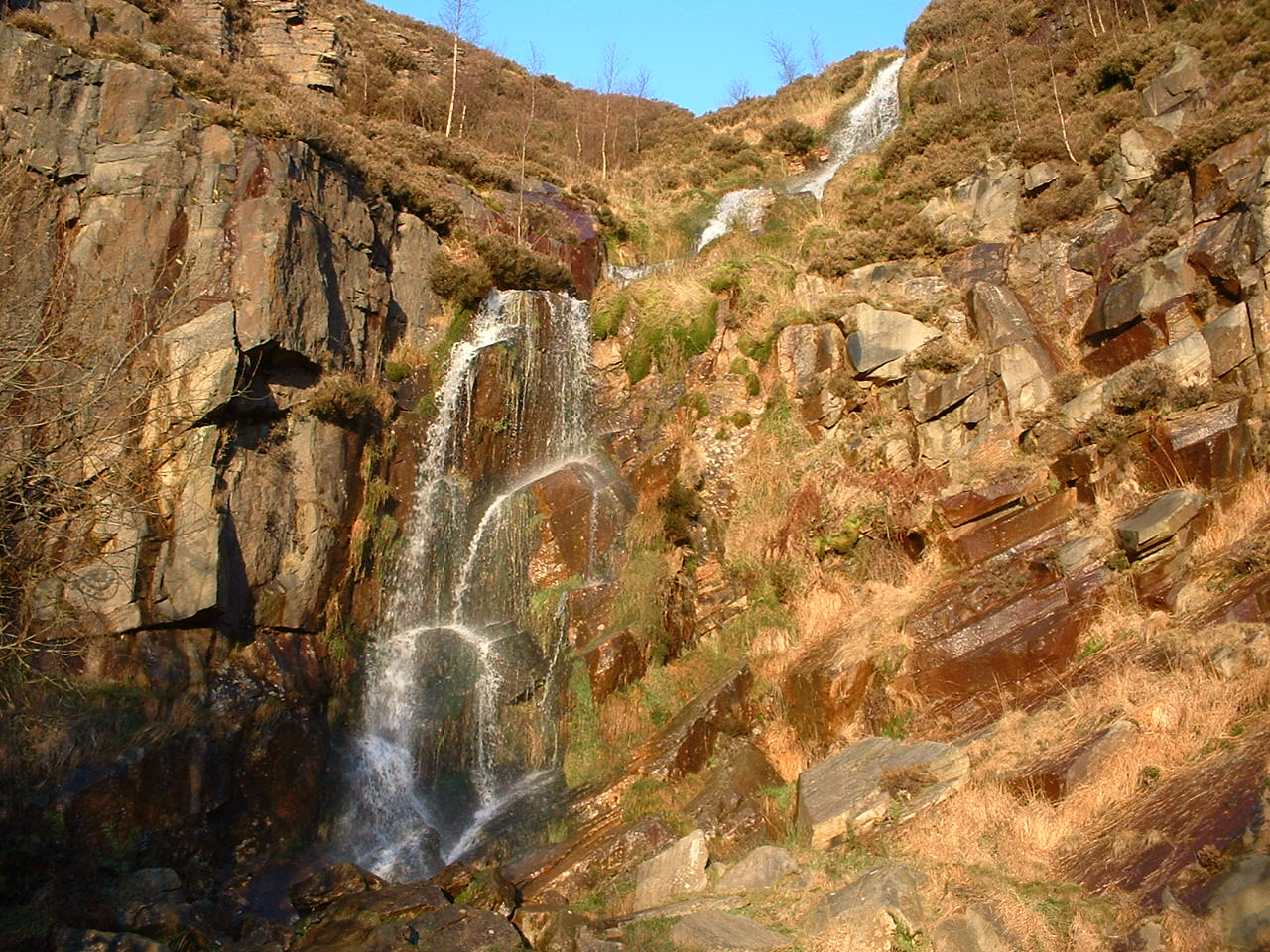

Location
- Country: England

Physical characteristics
- Source
  - location: Crow Knowl
- Mouth
  - location: River Beal
  - coordinates: 53°35′09.18″N 2°05′19.24″W

Old Brook is a small watercourse in Shaw and Crompton in the Metropolitan Borough of Oldham, Greater Manchester in the northwest of England. It flows from Crow Knowl on Crompton Moor to the River Beal. Its main feature is a waterfall at Pingot Quarry.

== Tributaries ==
- Brushes Brook (formerly Leornardin Brook)

== Gallery ==
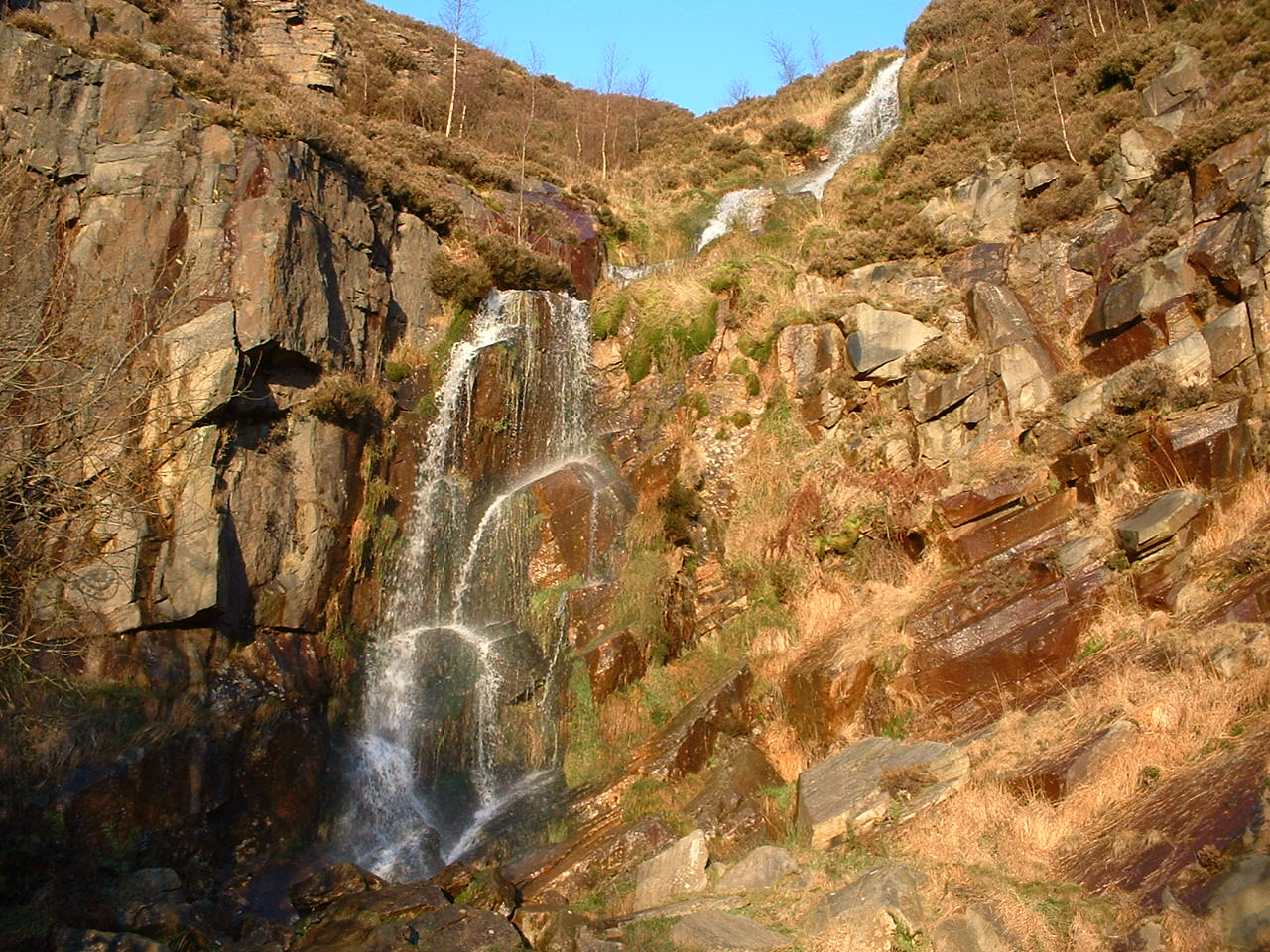
Waterfall

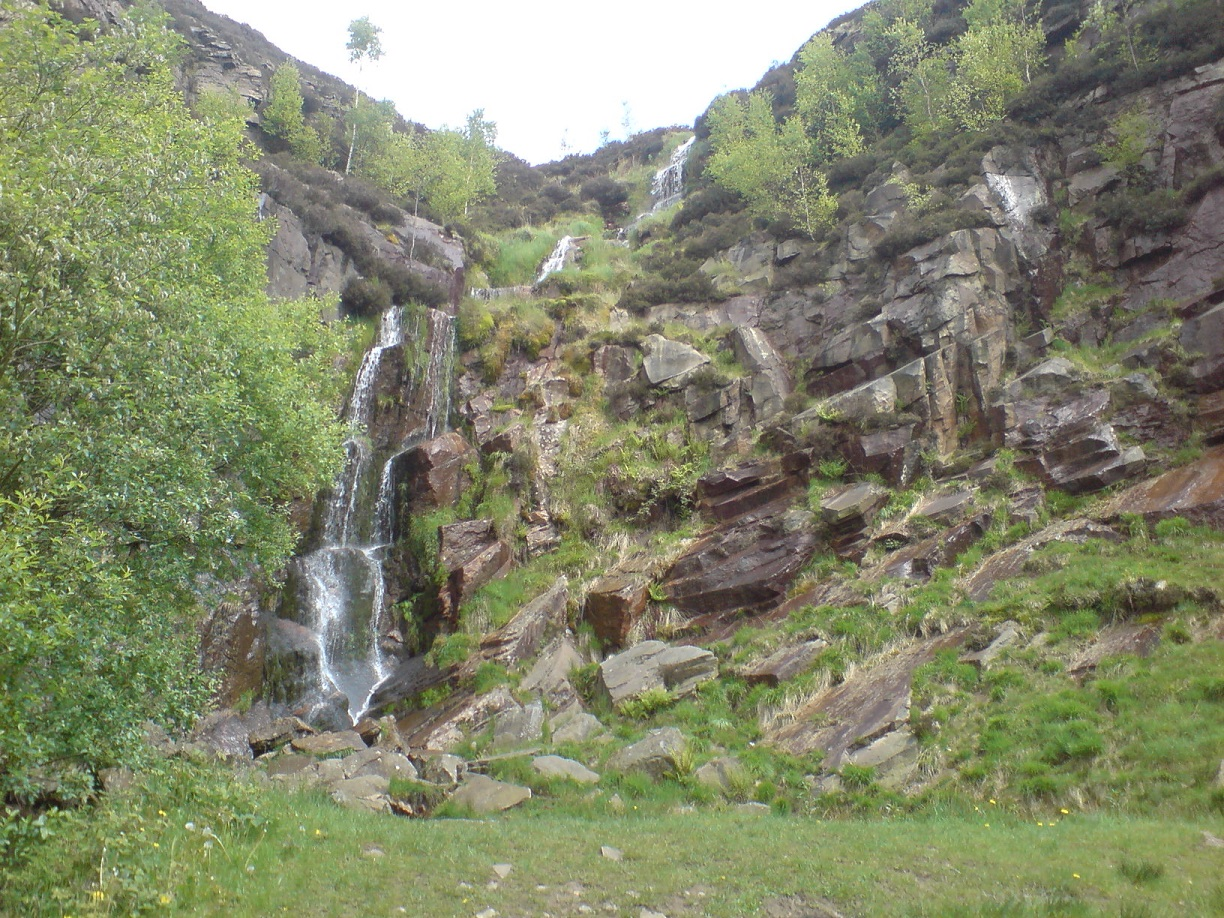
Pingot Quarry waterfall, 2009

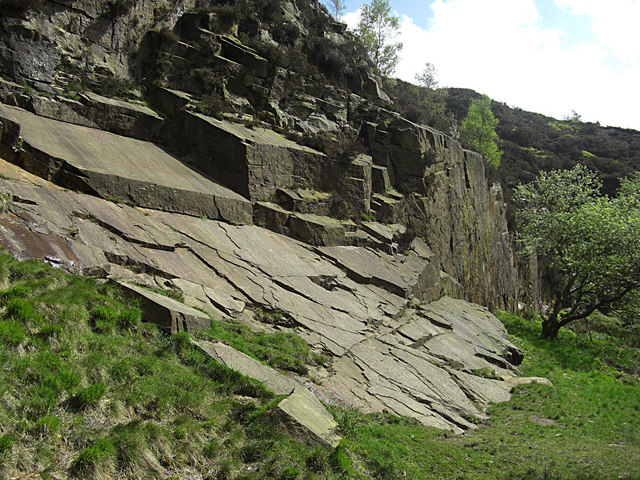
Pingot Quarry

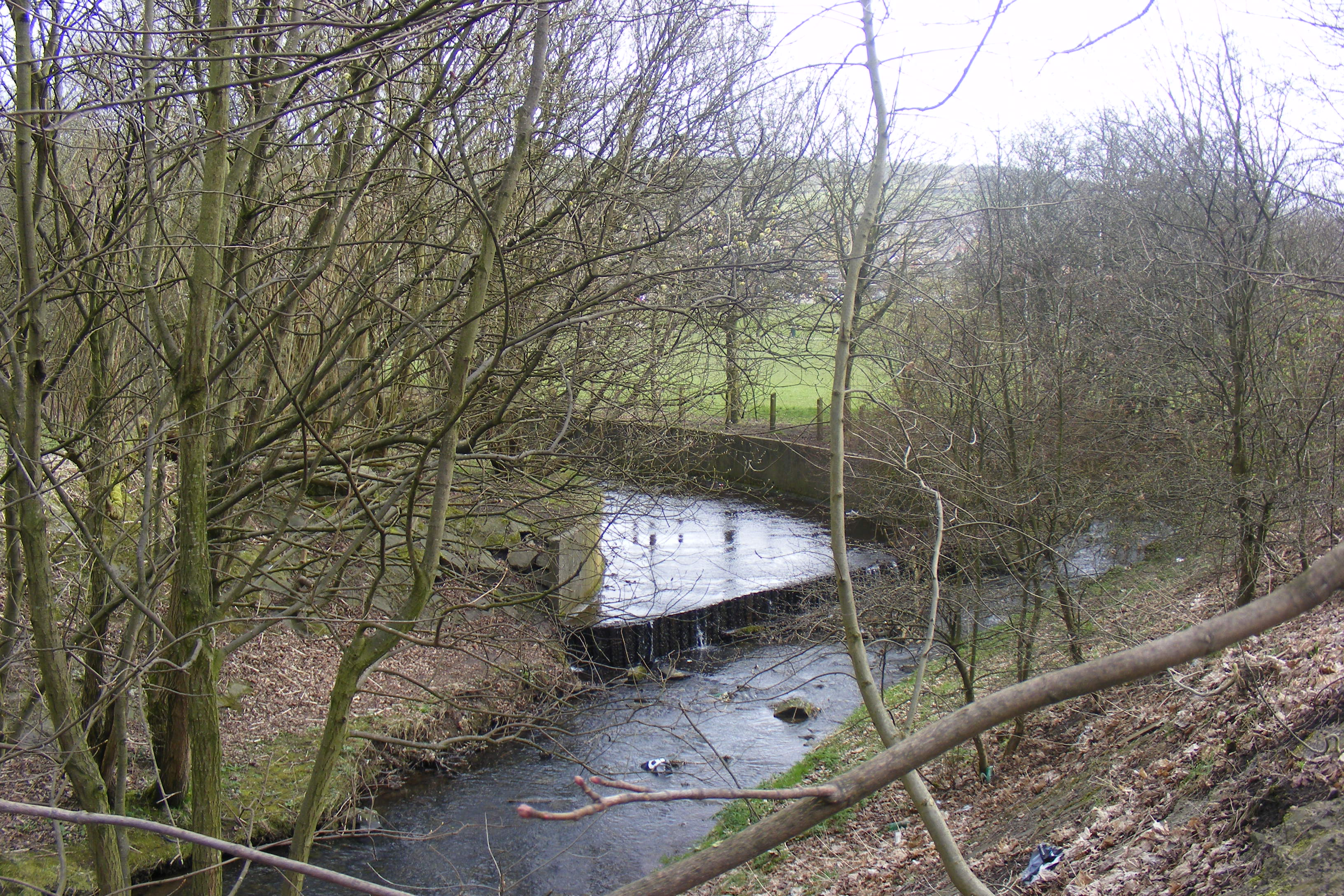
Confluence with River Beal
