= River Beal =

River in Greater Manchester, England

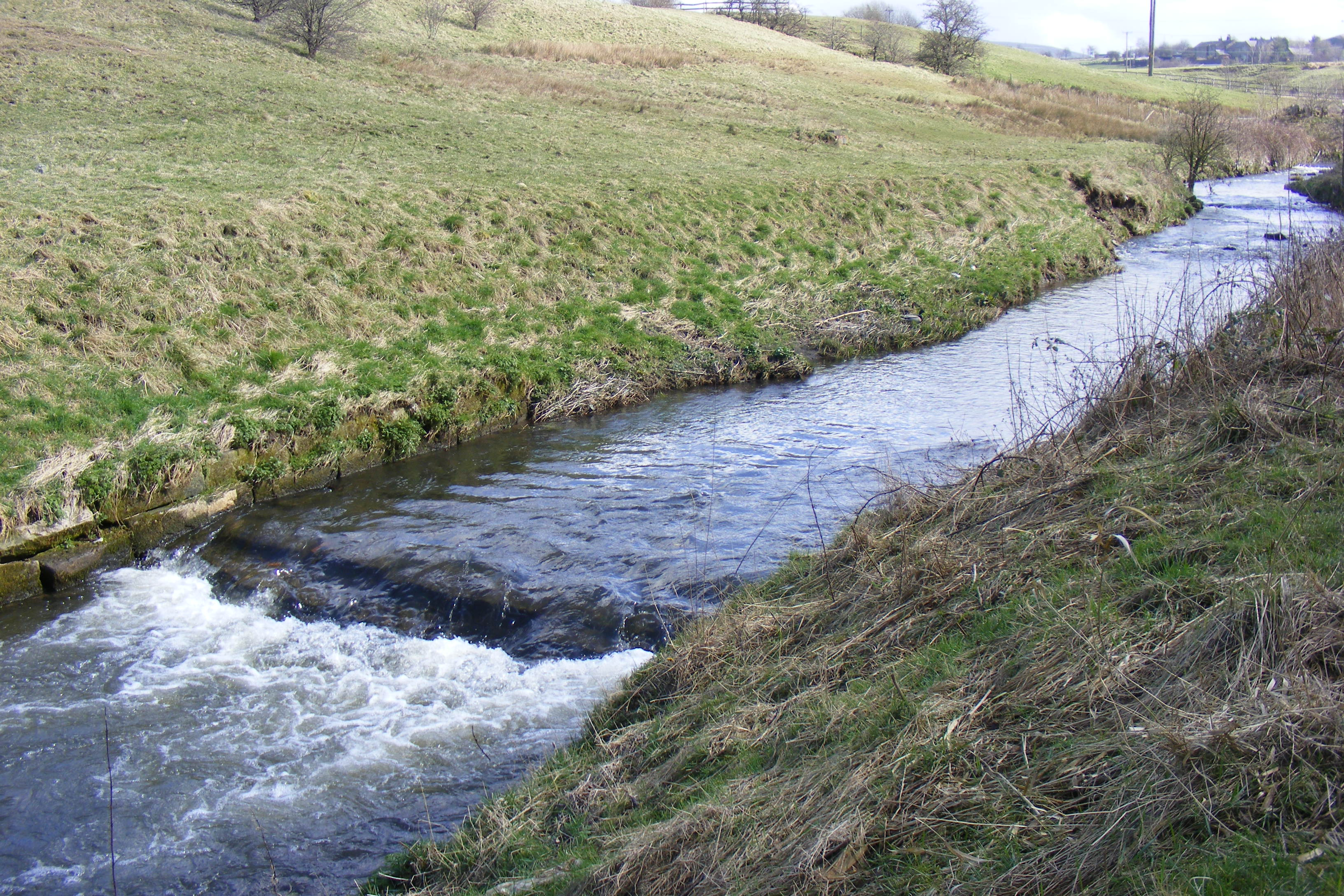
- River Beal at Firgrove.

Location
- Country: England

Physical characteristics
- Source
  - location: Stoneleigh Park, Derker
  - coordinates: 53°33′14″N 2°5′46″W
- Mouth
  - location: River Roch, Belfield
  - coordinates: 53°37′40.41″N 2°7′55.68″W

The Beal is a small river in Greater Manchester, England, and is a tributary of the River Roch. It rises in the Beal Valley in green space between Sholver and Royton, before continuing northwards through Shaw and Crompton, Newhey, Milnrow and Belfield.

== Course ==
From its source at Beal Valley, it flows north through Shaw and Crompton in the Metropolitan Borough of Oldham, where Old Brook and Pencil Brook are tributaries. It continues north through Newhey and Milnrow in the Metropolitan Borough of Rochdale, before joining the River Roch at Belfield.

The river marks part of the boundary between Oldham on one side and Royton and Shaw and Crompton on the other.

A small part of the course runs perpendicular to the Metrolink line, between Shaw and Crompton and Derker.

== History ==
1212: The Beal valley was recorded as part of the thegnage estate of Kaskenmoor, held on behalf of King John by Roger de Montbegon and William de Nevill.

1892: Ellenroad Cotton Mill was built on the bank of the Beal, and made fine cotton yarn by mule spinning.

During operation of a bleaching and dying works, discharge to the river of used dyes and waste would cause it to change colour from one day to another.

c. 1997: Littlewoods PLC changed the course of the river slightly to allow development of their Shaw National Distribution Warehouse Centre.

2005: Raw sewage was discharged to the river, killing thousands of fish and raising health fears among local residents.

== Tributaries ==
- Butterworth Hall Brook
- Piethorne Brook
- Jubilee Brook
- Old Brook
  - Leornardin Brook
- Pencil Brook
- Besom Hill Brook
  - Fullwood Brook
- Hodge Brook

| Next confluence upstream | River Roch | Next confluence downstream |
| Ash Brook | River Beal | Stanney Brook |

== Gallery ==
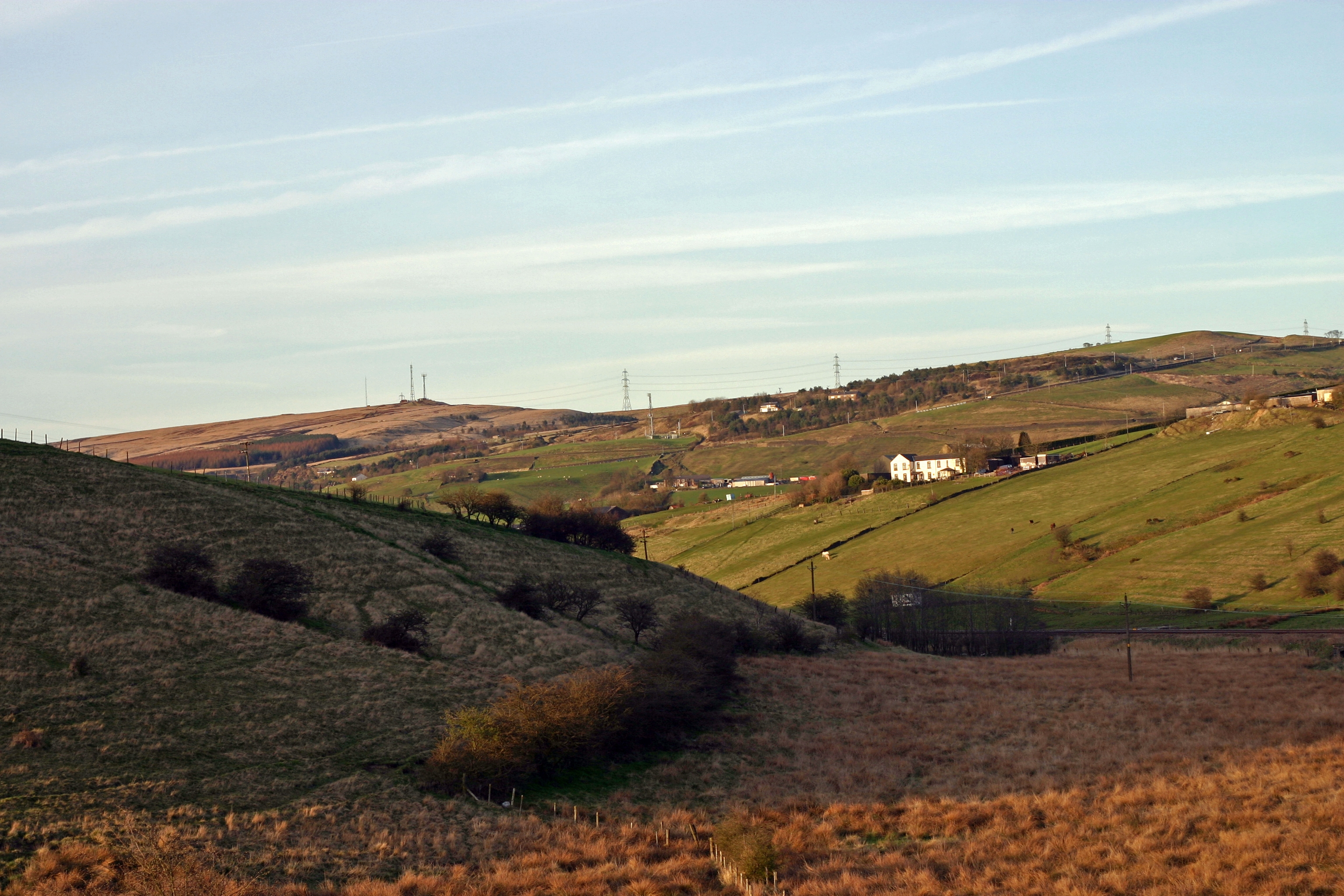
The River Beal is sourced from the Beal Valley, between Oldham and Shaw and Crompton

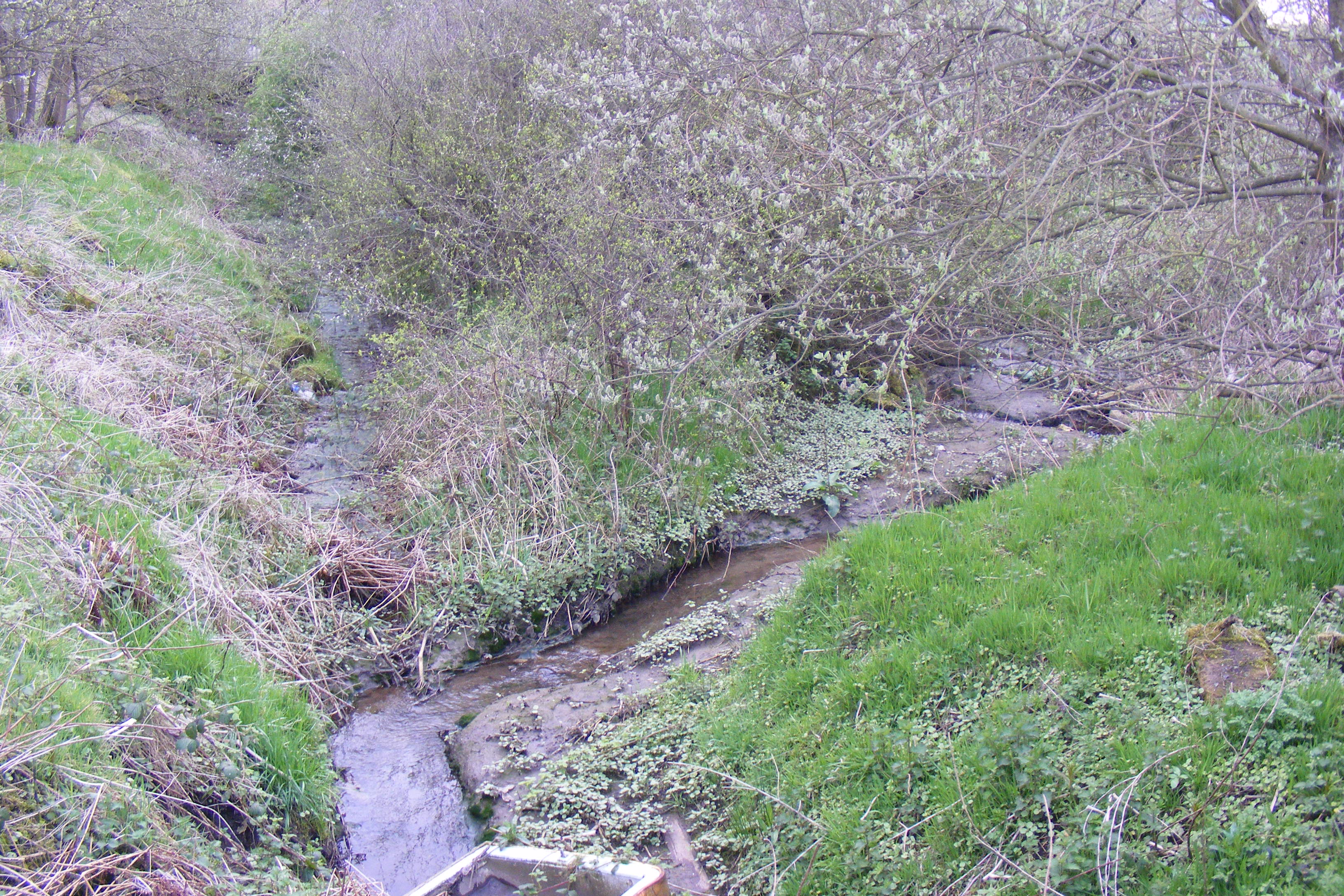
Infancy in Higginshaw

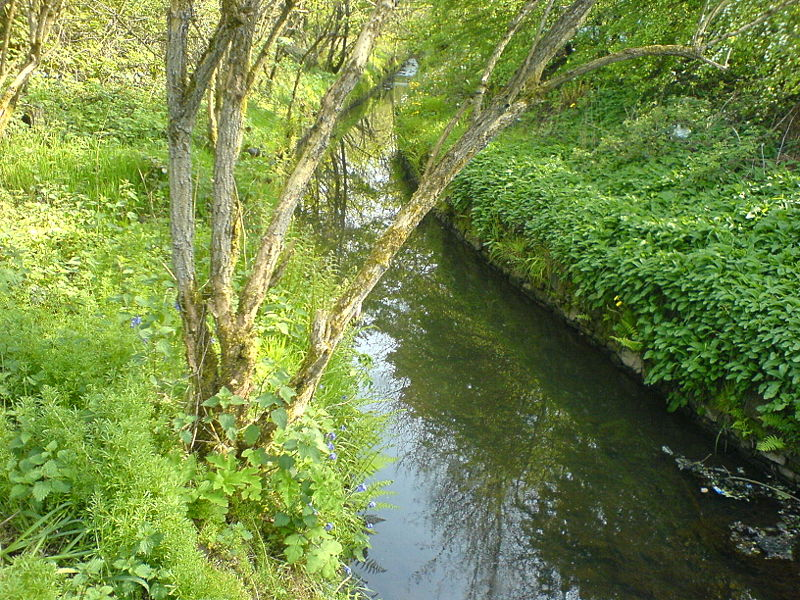
Jubilee, Shaw

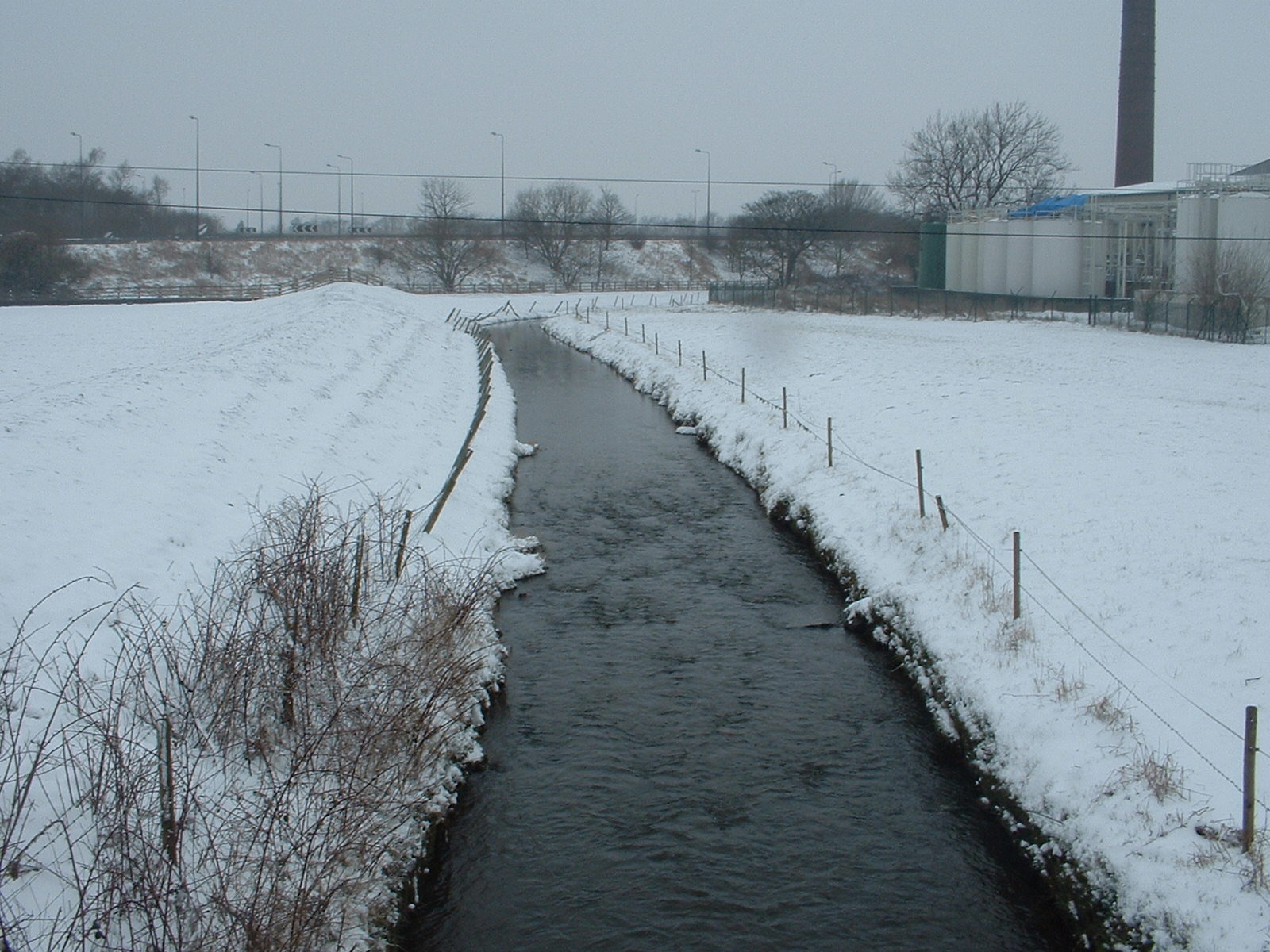
Looking downstream from Bentgate, Newhey

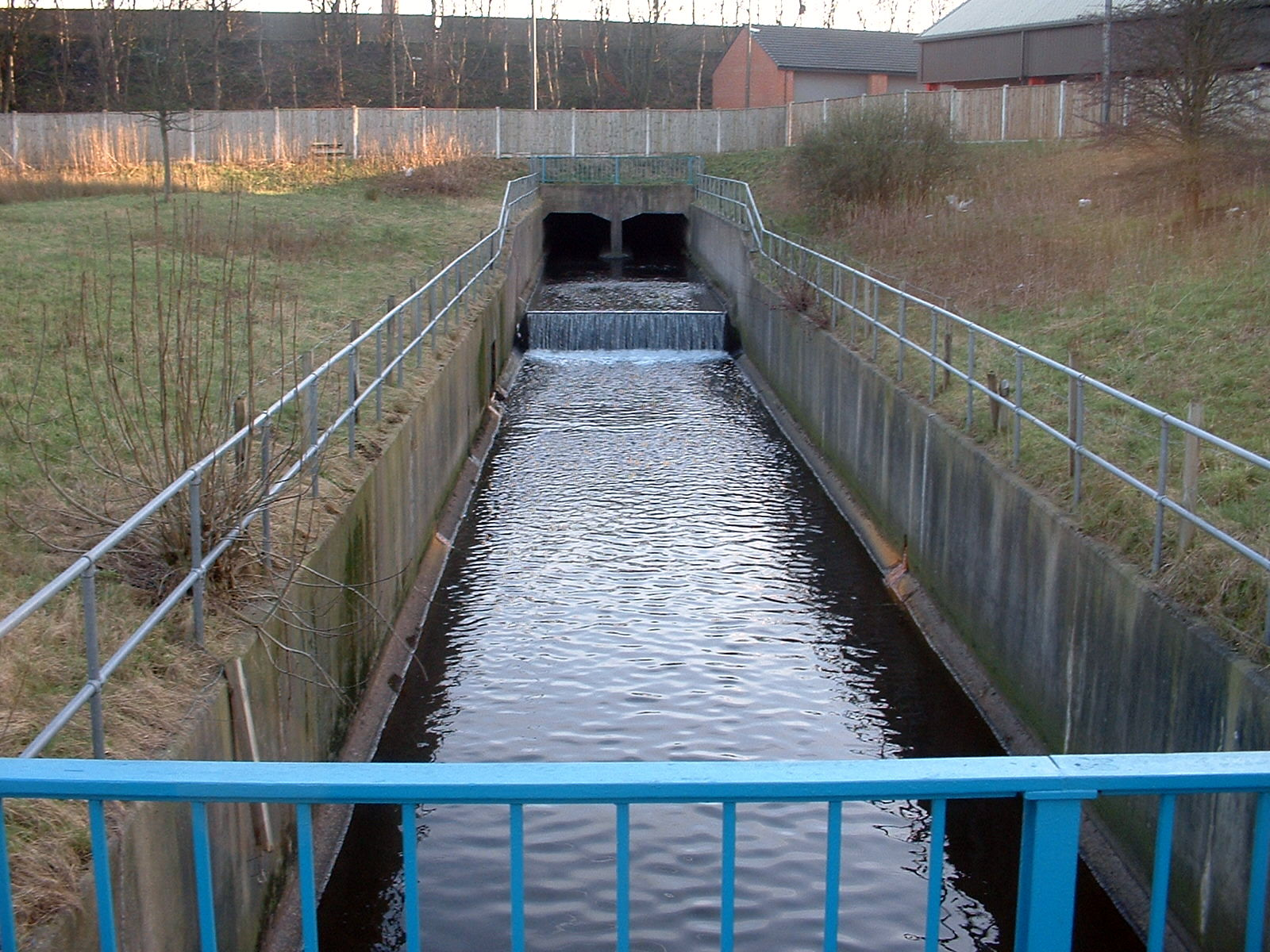
Between the M62 and A640 culverts

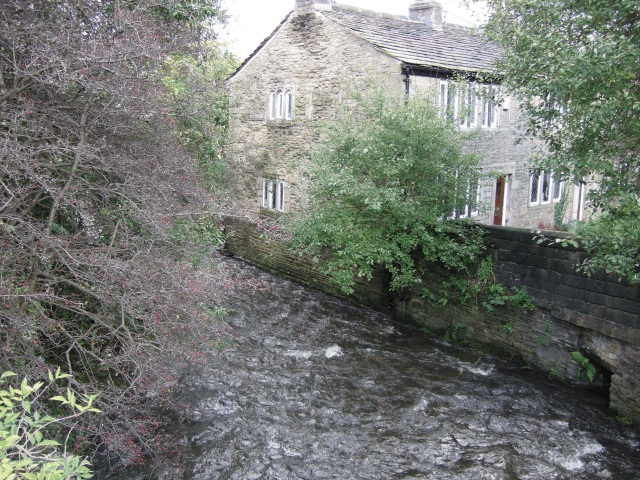
Downstream from Bridge Street

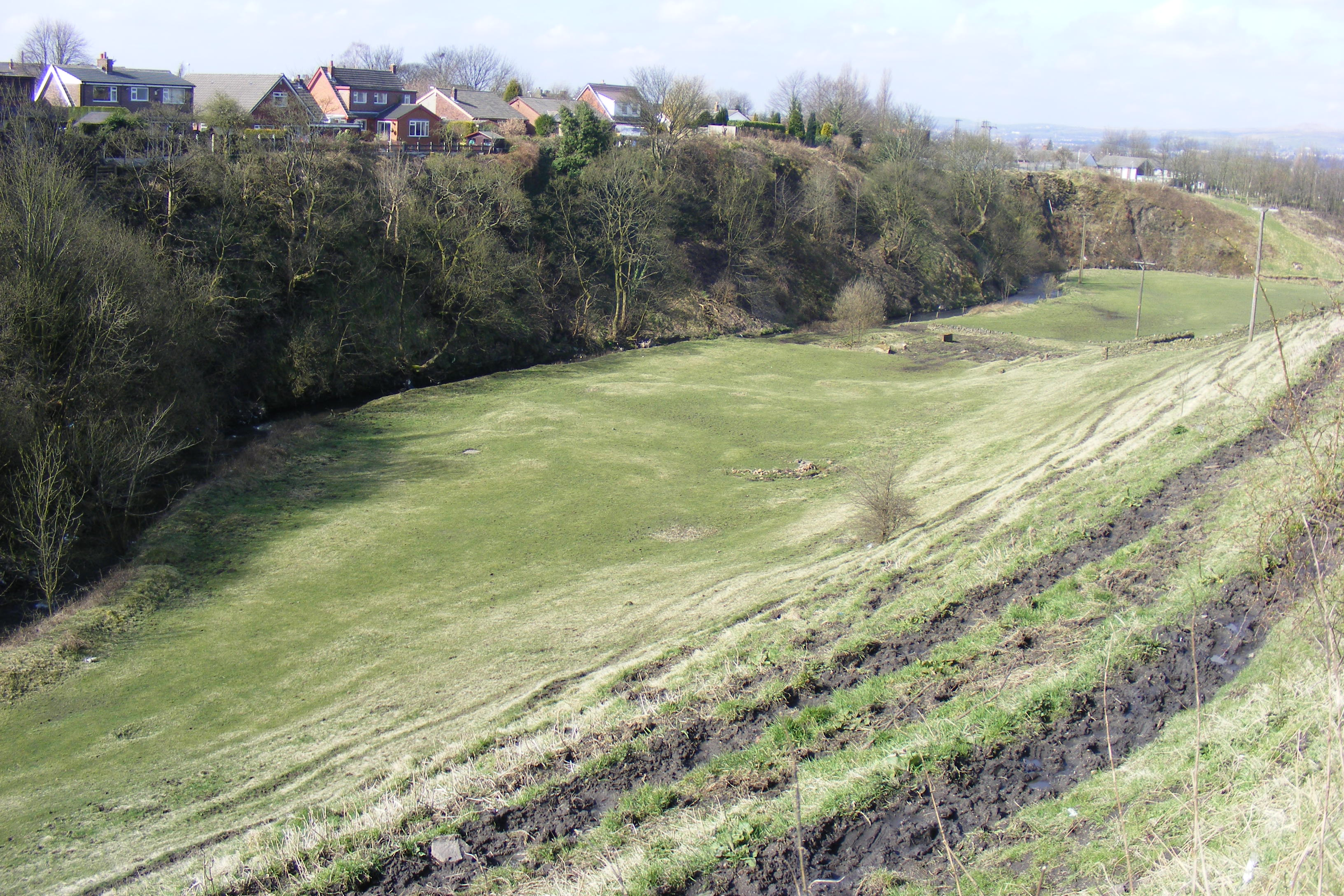
View from Ashes Lane, Milnrow

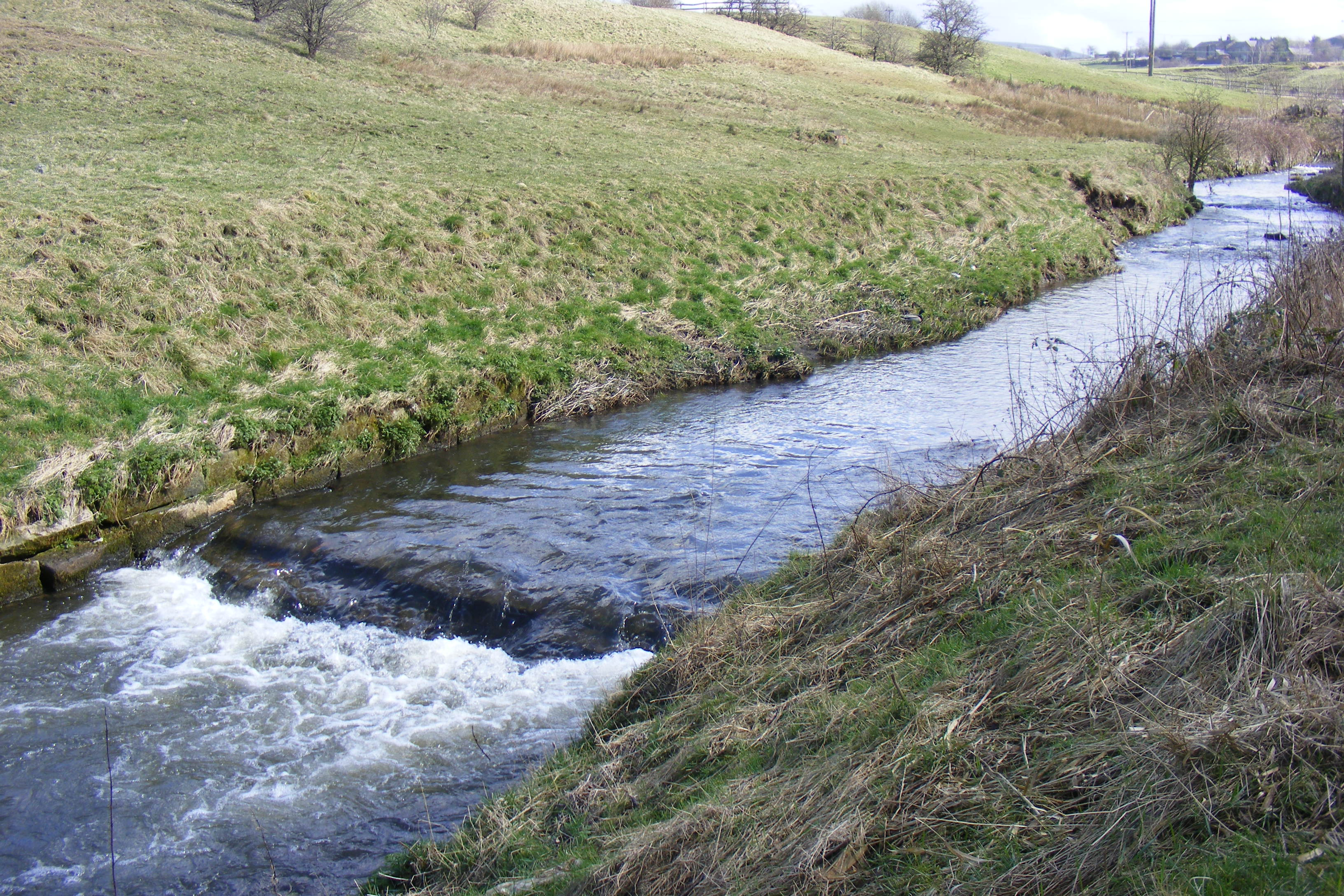
Upstream from Firgrove

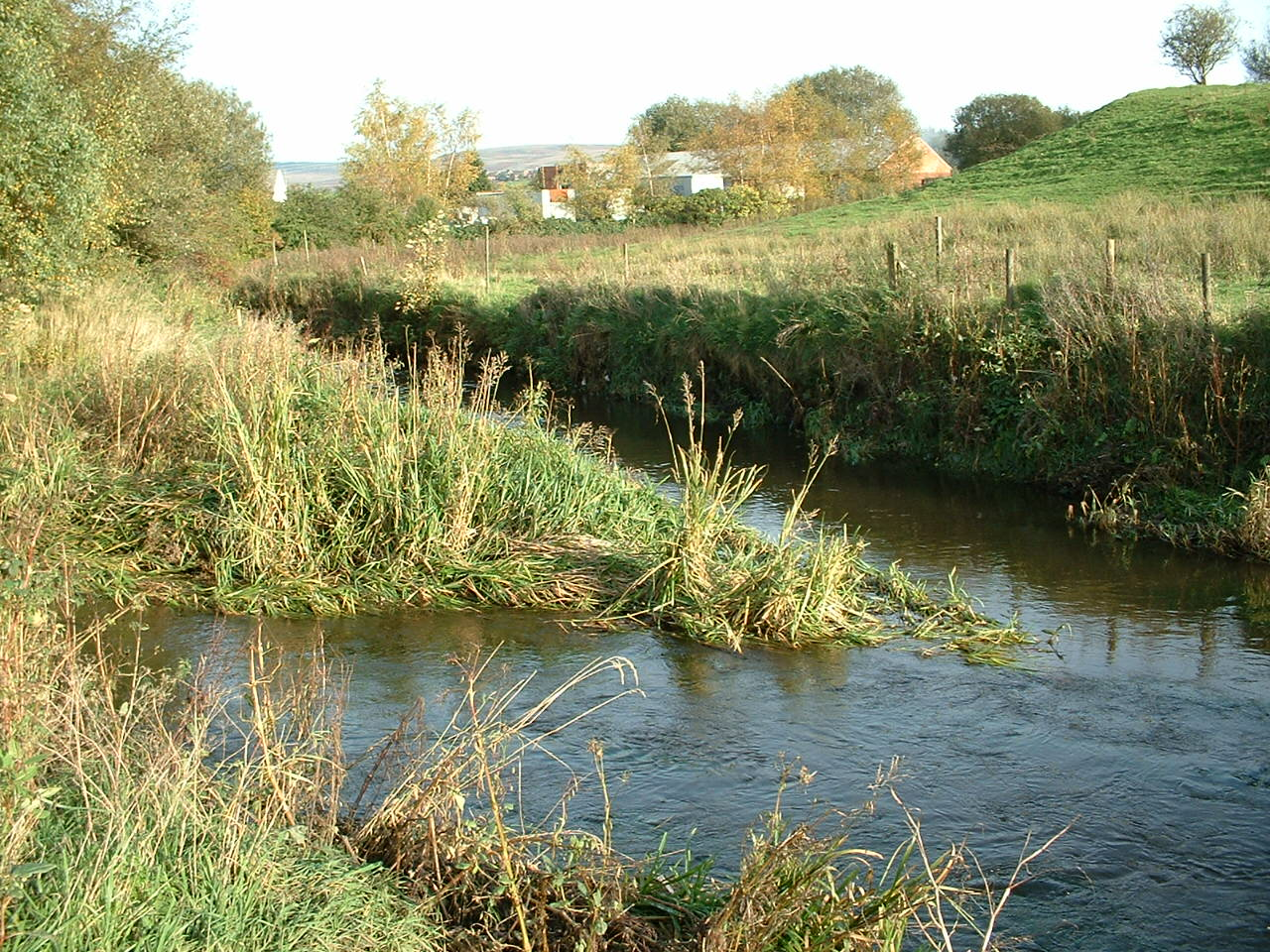
Confluence with River Roch
